= List of areas of London =

London is the capital of and largest city in England and the United Kingdom. It is divided into the City of London and 32 London boroughs, forming the ceremonial county of Greater London; the result of amalgamation of earlier units of administration that can be traced back to ancient parishes. Each borough is made up of many smaller areas that are variously called districts, neighbourhoods, suburbs, towns or villages.

== Background ==
John Strype's map of 1720 describes London as consisting of four parts: The City of London, Westminster, Southwark and the eastern 'That Part Beyond the Tower'. As London expanded, it absorbed many hundreds of existing towns and villages which continued to assert their local identities. Mark Twain described London in 1896 as "fifty villages massed solidly together over a vast stretch of territory". Steen Eiler Rasmussen observed in 1934 that "London became a greater and still greater accumulation of towns, an immense colony of dwellings where people still live in their own home in small communities with local government just as they had done in the Middle Ages." London boroughs are the result of amalgamations of hundreds of ancient parishes that date from at least the 12th century and are in some cases based on earlier manors.

== Areas of London ==
These are the areas of London that are variously described as districts, neighbourhoods, suburbs, towns or villages.

Location	London borough(s)	Post town	Postcode district(s)	Dialling code	OS grid ref.
Abbey Wood	Bexley, Greenwich	LONDON	SE2	020	TQ465785
Acton	Ealing, Hammersmith and Fulham	LONDON	W3, W4	020	TQ205805
Acton Green	Ealing	LONDON	W4	020	TQ204793
Addington	Croydon	CROYDON	CR0	020	TQ375645
Addiscombe	Croydon	CROYDON	CR0	020	TQ345665
Albany Park	Bexley	BEXLEY, SIDCUP	DA5, DA14	020	TQ478728
Aldborough Hatch	Redbridge	ILFORD	IG2	020	TQ455895
Aldgate	City	LONDON	EC3	020	TQ334813
Aldwych	Westminster	LONDON	WC2	020	TQ307810
Alperton	Brent	WEMBLEY	HA0	020	TQ185835
Anerley	Bromley	LONDON	SE20	020	TQ345695
Angel	Islington	LONDON	EC1, N1	020	TQ345665
Aperfield	Bromley	WESTERHAM	TN16	01959	TQ425585
Archway	Islington	LONDON	N19	020	TQ285875
Ardleigh Green	Havering	HORNCHURCH	RM11	01708	TQ535895
Arkley	Barnet	BARNET, LONDON	EN5, NW7	020	TQ225955
Arnos Grove	Enfield	LONDON	N11, N14	020	TQ295925
Balham	Wandsworth	LONDON	SW12	020	TQ285735
Bankside	Southwark	LONDON	SE1	020	TQ325795
Barbican	City	LONDON	EC1, EC2	020	TQ322818
Barking	Barking and Dagenham	BARKING	IG11	020	TQ440840
Barking Riverside	Barking and Dagenham	BARKING	IG11	020	TQ466823
Barkingside	Redbridge	ILFORD	IG6	020	TQ445895
Barnehurst	Bexley	BEXLEYHEATH	DA7	01322	TQ505755
Barnes	Richmond upon Thames	LONDON	SW13	020	TQ225765
Barnes Cray	Bexley	DARTFORD	DA1	01322	TQ525755
Barnet (also Chipping Barnet, High Barnet)	Barnet	BARNET	EN5	020	TQ245955
Barnet Gate	Barnet	LONDON, BARNET	NW7, EN5	020	TQ218952
Barnsbury	Islington	LONDON	N1	020	TQ305845
Battersea	Wandsworth	LONDON	SW11	020	TQ285765
Bayswater	Westminster	LONDON	W2	020	TQ255805
Beam Park	Barking and Dagenham, Havering	DAGENHAM, RAINHAM	RM9, RM13	020	TQ504828
Beckenham	Bromley	BECKENHAM, LONDON	BR3, SE20	020	TQ375695
Beckton	Newham	LONDON, BARKING	E6, E16, IG11	020	TQ435815
Becontree	Barking and Dagenham	DAGENHAM	RM9	020	TQ485855
Becontree Heath	Barking and Dagenham	DAGENHAM	RM8	020	TQ493871
Beddington	Sutton	WALLINGTON, CROYDON	SM6, CR0	020	TQ305655
Bedford Park	Ealing	LONDON	W4	020	TQ208793
Belgravia	Westminster	LONDON	SW1	020	TQ283792
Bell Green	Lewisham	LONDON	SE6, SE26	020	TQ397721
Bellingham	Lewisham	LONDON	SE6	020	TQ375715
Belmont	Harrow	HARROW, STANMORE	HA3, HA7	020	TQ165905
Belmont	Sutton	SUTTON	SM2	020	TQ253620
Belsize Park	Camden	LONDON	NW3	020	TQ273845
Belvedere	Bexley	BELVEDERE	DA17	020	TQ495785
Bermondsey	Southwark	LONDON	SE1	020	TQ335795
Berry's Green	Bromley	WESTERHAM	TN16	01959	TQ436592
Berrylands	Kingston upon Thames	SURBITON	KT5	020	TQ195675
Bethnal Green	Tower Hamlets	LONDON	E2	020	TQ345825
Bexley (also Old Bexley, Bexley Village)	Bexley	BEXLEY	DA5	020	TQ465755
Bexleyheath (also Bexley New Town)	Bexley	BEXLEYHEATH, LONDON	DA6, DA7, SE2	020	TQ485755
Bickley	Bromley	BROMLEY	BR3	020	TQ423688
Biggin Hill	Bromley	WESTERHAM	TN16	01959	TQ418590
Blackfen	Bexley	SIDCUP	DA15	020	TQ455745
Blackfriars	City	LONDON	EC4	020	TQ318808
Blackheath	Lewisham	LONDON	SE3	020	TQ395765
Blackheath Royal Standard	Greenwich	LONDON	SE3, SE12	020	TQ399753
Blackwall	Tower Hamlets	LONDON	E14	020	TQ385805
Blendon	Bexley	BEXLEY	DA5	020	TQ478742
Bloomsbury	Camden	LONDON	WC1	020	TQ299820
Botany Bay	Enfield	ENFIELD	EN2	020	TQ297992
Bounds Green	Haringey	LONDON	N11, N22	020	TQ298914
Bow	Tower Hamlets	LONDON	E3	020	TQ365825
Bowes Park	Haringey	LONDON	N22	020	TQ305915
Brentford	Hounslow	BRENTFORD	TW8	020	TQ177778
Brent Cross	Barnet	LONDON	NW2, NW4	020	TQ230874
Brent Park	Brent	LONDON	NW10	020	TQ209852
Brimsdown	Enfield	ENFIELD	EN3	020	TQ365975
Brixton	Lambeth	LONDON	SW2, SW9, SE5	020	TQ315755
Brockley	Lewisham	LONDON	SE4	020	TQ365745
Bromley	Bromley	BROMLEY	BR1	020	TQ405695
Bromley (also Bromley-by-Bow)	Tower Hamlets	LONDON	E3	020	TQ375825
Bromley Common	Bromley	BROMLEY	BR3	020	TQ416669
Brompton	Kensington and Chelsea, Hammersmith and Fulham	LONDON	SW3	020	TQ272788
Brondesbury	Brent	LONDON	NW6	020	TQ245845
Brunswick Park	Barnet	LONDON	N11	020	TQ280932
Bulls Cross	Enfield	ENFIELD	EN2, EN3	020	TQ342994
Bullsmoor	Enfield	ENFIELD	EN1, EN3	020	TQ349999
Burnt Oak	Barnet	EDGWARE	HA8	020	TQ205915
Burroughs, The	Barnet	LONDON	NW4	020	TQ227891
Bush Hill Park	Enfield	ENFIELD	EN1	020	TQ341959
Camberwell	Southwark	LONDON	SE5	020	TQ325767
Cambridge Heath	Tower Hamlets	LONDON	E2	020	TQ348832
Camden Town	Camden	LONDON	NW1	020	TQ295845
Canary Wharf	Tower Hamlets	LONDON	E14	020	TQ375802
Cann Hall	Waltham Forest	LONDON	E11	020	TQ395875
Canning Town	Newham	LONDON	E16	020	TQ405815
Canonbury	Islington	LONDON	N1	020	TQ325845
Carshalton	Sutton	CARSHALTON	SM5	020	TQ275645
Castelnau	Richmond upon Thames	LONDON	SW13	020	TQ226776
Castle Green	Barking and Dagenham	DAGENHAM	RM9	020	TQ475837
Catford	Lewisham	LONDON	SE6	020	TQ385735
Chadwell Heath	Barking and Dagenham, Redbridge	ROMFORD	RM6	020	TQ485885
Chalk Farm	Camden	LONDON	NW1	020	TQ281844
Charing Cross	Westminster	LONDON	WC2	020	TQ305805
Charlton	Greenwich	LONDON	SE7	020	TQ415785
Chase Cross	Havering	ROMFORD	RM5	01708	TQ505925
Cheam	Sutton	SUTTON	SM1, SM2, SM3	020	TQ245625
Chelsea	Kensington and Chelsea	LONDON	SW3	020	TQ275775
Chelsfield	Bromley	ORPINGTON	BR6	01689	TQ482642
Chessington	Kingston upon Thames	CHESSINGTON	KT9	020	TQ183641
Childs Hill	Barnet	LONDON	NW2	020	TQ245865
Chinatown	Westminster	LONDON	W1	020	TQ297808
Chinbrook	Lewisham	LONDON	SE12	020	TQ411722
Chingford	Waltham Forest	LONDON	E4	020	TQ395945
Chislehurst	Bromley	CHISLEHURST	BR7	020	TQ445705
Chiswick	Hounslow, Ealing	LONDON	W4	020	TQ205785
Church End	Brent	LONDON	NW10	020	TQ205785
Church End	Barnet	LONDON	N3	020	TQ255905
Clapham	Lambeth, Wandsworth	LONDON	SW4	020	TQ295755
Clapham Junction	Wandsworth	LONDON	SW11	020	TQ272755
Clayhall	Redbridge	ILFORD	IG5, IG6	020	TQ445865
Clerkenwell	Islington, Camden	LONDON	EC1	020	TQ315825
Cockfosters	Barnet, Enfield	BARNET	EN4	020	TQ275965
Coldblow	Bromley	BEXLEY	DA5	020	TQ504731
Colindale	Barnet	LONDON	NW9	020	TQ213897
Collier Row	Havering	ROMFORD	RM5	01708	TQ505905
Colliers Wood	Merton	LONDON	SW19	020	TQ275705
Colney Hatch	Barnet	LONDON	N11, N10	020	TQ278918
Coney Hall	Bromley	WEST WICKHAM	BR4	020	TQ394653
Coombe	Croydon	CROYDON	CR0	020	TQ342647
Coombe	Kingston upon Thames	KINGSTON UPON THAMES	KT2	020	TQ208703
Coulsdon	Croydon	COULSDON	CR5	020, 01737	TQ298596
Covent Garden	Westminster, Camden	LONDON	WC2	020	TQ303809
Cowley	Hillingdon	UXBRIDGE	UB8	01895	TQ055825
Cranford	Hounslow	HOUNSLOW	TW5	020	TQ105765
Cranham	Havering	UPMINSTER	RM14	01708	TQ575875
Crayford	Bexley	DARTFORD	DA1	01322	TQ515745
Creekmouth	Barking and Dagenham	BARKING	IG11	020	TQ457820
Crews Hill	Enfield	ENFIELD	EN2	020	TQ315995
Cricklewood	Barnet, Brent	LONDON	NW2	020	TQ235855
Crofton Park	Lewisham	LONDON	SE4	020	TQ367744
Crook Log	Bexley	BEXLEYHEATH	DA6	020	TQ480754
Crossness	Bexley	LONDON	SE2	020	TQ480800
Crouch End	Haringey	LONDON	N8	020	TQ295885
Croydon	Croydon	CROYDON	CR0	020	TQ335655
Crystal Palace	Bromley	LONDON	SE19, SE20, SE26	020	TQ341708
Cubitt Town	Tower Hamlets	LONDON	E14	020	TQ385795
Cudham	Bromley	SEVENOAKS	TN14	01959	TQ445595
Custom House	Newham	LONDON	E16	020	TQ408807
Dagenham	Barking and Dagenham	DAGENHAM	RM9, RM10	020	TQ485845
Dalston	Hackney	LONDON	E8	020	TQ345845
De Beauvoir Town	Hackney	LONDON	N1	020	TQ332842
Denmark Hill	Southwark	LONDON	SE5	020	TQ327760
Deptford	Lewisham	LONDON	SE8	020	TQ365775
Derry Downs	Bromley	ORPINGTON	BR5	01689	TQ476671
Dollis Hill	Brent	LONDON	NW2	020	TQ225865
Downe	Bromley	ORPINGTON	BR6	01689	TQ435615
Downham	Lewisham	BROMLEY	BR1	020	TQ395715
Dulwich	Lambeth, Southwark	LONDON	SE21	020	TQ345725
Dulwich Village	Southwark	LONDON	SE21, SE22	020	TQ330738
Ealing	Ealing	LONDON	W5, W13	020	TQ175805
Earls Court	Kensington and Chelsea	LONDON	SW5, SW10	020	TQ254784
Earlsfield	Wandsworth	LONDON	SW18	020	TQ265735
East Barnet	Barnet	BARNET	EN4	020	TQ275945
East Bedfont	Hounslow	FELTHAM	TW14	020	TQ085735
East Dulwich	Southwark	LONDON	SE22	020	TQ345745
East Finchley	Barnet	LONDON	N2	020	TQ265895
East Ham	Newham	LONDON	E6	020	TQ425835
East Sheen	Richmond upon Thames	LONDON	SW14	020	TQ205755
East Wickham	Bexley	WELLING	DA16	020	TQ468771
Eastcote	Hillingdon	PINNER	HA5, HA4	020	TQ115885
Eden Park	Bromley	BECKENHAM	BR3	020	TQ373675
Edgware	Barnet	EDGWARE	HA8	020	TQ195925
Edmonton	Enfield	LONDON	N9, N18	020	TQ335925
Eel Pie Island	Richmond upon Thames	TWICKENHAM	TW1	020	TQ164731
Elephant and Castle	Southwark	LONDON	SE1, SE11, SE17	020	TQ319789
Elm Park	Havering	HORNCHURCH	RM12	01708	TQ525855
Elmers End	Bromley	BECKENHAM	BR3	020	TQ355685
Elmstead	Bromley	CHISLEHURST	BR7	020	TQ425705
Eltham	Greenwich	LONDON	SE9	020	TQ425745
Emerson Park	Havering	HORNCHURCH	RM11	01708	TQ545885
Enfield	Enfield	ENFIELD	EN1, EN2	020	TQ325965
Enfield Highway	Enfield	ENFIELD	EN3	020	TQ355975
Enfield Lock	Enfield	ENFIELD	EN3	01992	TQ365985
Enfield Wash	Enfield	ENFIELD	EN3	020	TQ355985
Euston	Camden	LONDON	NW1, W1	020	TQ294829
Erith	Bexley	ERITH	DA8, DA18	01322	TQ505775
Falconwood	Bexley, Greenwich	LONDON, WELLING	SE9, DA16	020	TQ455755
Farringdon	Islington, City	LONDON	EC1	020	TQ315818
Feltham	Hounslow	FELTHAM	TW13, TW14	020	TQ105735
Finchley	Barnet	LONDON	N2, N3, N12	020	TQ255905
Finsbury	Islington	LONDON	EC1	020	TQ315825
Finsbury Park	Haringey, Islington	LONDON	N4	020	TQ314872
Fitzrovia	Camden, Westminster	LONDON	W1	020	TQ293816
Foots Cray	Bexley	SIDCUP	DA14	020	TQ472709
Forest Gate	Newham	LONDON	E7	020	TQ405855
Forest Hill	Lewisham	LONDON	SE23	020	TQ354736
Forestdale	Croydon	CROYDON	CR0	020	TQ366625
Fortis Green	Haringey	LONDON	N10	020	TQ281896
Freezywater	Enfield	ENFIELD	EN3	020	TQ361993
Friern Barnet	Barnet	LONDON	N11	020	TQ276920
Frognal	Camden	LONDON	NW3	020	TQ257853
Fulham	Hammersmith and Fulham	LONDON	SW6	020	TQ245765
Fulwell	Richmond upon Thames	TEDDINGTON, HAMPTON	TW11, TW12	020	TQ149719
Gallows Corner	Havering	ROMFORD	RM2, RM3	01708	TQ535905
Gants Hill	Redbridge	ILFORD	IG2	020	TQ435885
Gidea Park	Havering	ROMFORD	RM2	01708	TQ525905
Gipsy Hill	Lambeth	LONDON	SE19, SE27	020	TQ332710
Goddington	Bromley	ORPINGTON	BR6	01689	TQ475655
Golders Green	Barnet	LONDON	NW11	020	TQ248876
Goodmayes	Redbridge	ILFORD	IG3	020	TQ465865
Gordon Hill	Enfield	ENFIELD	EN2	020	TQ319977
Gospel Oak	Camden	LONDON	NW5, NW3	020	TQ285855
Grahame Park	Barnet	LONDON	NW9	020	TQ217905
Grange Park	Enfield	LONDON	N21	020	TQ313962
Greenford	Ealing	GREENFORD	UB6	020	TQ135825
Greenwich	Greenwich	LONDON	SE10	020	TQ395775
Grove Park	Hounslow	LONDON	W4	020	TQ205775
Grove Park	Lewisham	LONDON	SE12	020	TQ404722
Gunnersbury	Hounslow	LONDON	W4	020	TQ195785
Hackney	Hackney	LONDON	E5, E8, E9, N1, N16	020	TQ345845
Hackney Central	Hackney	LONDON	E8	020	TQ347850
Hackney Marshes	Hackney	LONDON	E9	020	TQ365861
Hackney Wick	Hackney	LONDON	E9	020	TQ369847
Hadley Wood	Enfield	BARNET	EN4	020	TQ265975
Haggerston	Hackney	LONDON	E2	020	TQ335835
Hainault	Redbridge	CHIGWELL	IG7	020	TQ445915
Hale, The	Barnet	LONDON	NW7	020	TQ205918
Ham	Richmond upon Thames	RICHMOND	TW10	020	TQ175725
Hammersmith	Hammersmith and Fulham	LONDON	W6	020	TQ233786
Hampstead	Camden	LONDON	NW3	020	TQ265855
Hampstead Garden Suburb	Barnet	LONDON	N2	020	TQ265885
Hampton	Richmond upon Thames	HAMPTON	TW12	020	TQ135705
Hampton Hill	Richmond upon Thames	HAMPTON	TW12	020	TQ144710
Hampton Wick	Richmond upon Thames	KINGSTON UPON THAMES	KT1	020	TQ176695
Hamsey Green	Croydon, Tandridge	WARLINGHAM	CR6	01687	TQ350595
Hanwell	Ealing	LONDON	W7	020	TQ153802
Hanworth	Hounslow	FELTHAM	TW13	020	TQ125715
Harefield	Hillingdon	UXBRIDGE	UB9	01895	TQ055905
Harlesden	Brent	LONDON	NW10	020	TQ215835
Harlington	Hillingdon	HAYES	UB3	020	TQ085775
Harmondsworth	Hillingdon	WEST DRAYTON	UB7	020	TQ055775
Harold Hill	Havering	ROMFORD	RM3	01708	TQ545925
Harold Park	Havering	ROMFORD	RM3	01708	TQ555915
Harold Wood	Havering	ROMFORD	RM3	01708	TQ545905
Harringay	Haringey	LONDON	N4, N8, N15	020	TQ317887
Harrow	Harrow	HARROW	HA1	020	TQ145885
Harrow on the Hill	Harrow	HARROW	HA1	020	TQ155865
Harrow Weald	Harrow	HARROW	HA3	020	TQ145885
Hatch End	Harrow	PINNER	HA5	020	TQ125915
Hatton	Hounslow	FELTHAM	TW14	020	TQ095755
Havering-atte-Bower	Havering	ROMFORD	RM4	01708	TQ515935
Hayes	Bromley	BROMLEY	BR2	020	TQ405665
Hayes	Hillingdon	HAYES	UB3, UB4	020	TQ095805
Hazelwood	Bromley	ORPINGTON	BR6	01689	TQ445616
Hendon	Barnet	LONDON	NW4	020	TQ229887
Herne Hill	Lambeth, Southwark	LONDON	SE24	020	TQ325745
Heston	Hounslow	HOUNSLOW	TW5	020	TQ125775
Highams Park	Waltham Forest	LONDON	E4	020	TQ375915
Highbury	Islington	LONDON	N5	020	TQ319854
Highgate	Camden, Islington, Haringey	LONDON	N6	020	TQ285875
Hillingdon	Hillingdon	UXBRIDGE	UB8, UB10	020	TQ071827
Hither Green	Lewisham	LONDON	SE13	020	TQ395745
Holborn	Camden, City	LONDON	WC1, WC2	020	TQ305815
Holland Park	Kensington and Chelsea	LONDON	W8, W11, W14	020	TQ246798
Holloway	Islington	LONDON	N7	020	TQ307859
Homerton	Hackney	LONDON	E9	020	TQ355855
Honor Oak	Lewisham	LONDON	SE23	020	TQ355745
Hook	Kingston upon Thames	CHESSINGTON	KT9	020	TQ183647
Hornchurch	Havering	HORNCHURCH	RM11, RM12	01708	TQ535865
Horn Park	Greenwich, Lewisham	LONDON	SE12	020	TQ408739
Horns Green	Bromley	SEVENOAKS	TN14	01959	TQ450585
Hornsey	Haringey	LONDON	N8	020	TQ305895
Hounslow	Hounslow	HOUNSLOW	TW3	020	TQ145755
Hoxton	Hackney	LONDON	N1	020	TQ335835
Hyde, The	Barnet	LONDON	NW9	020	TQ215888
Ickenham	Hillingdon	UXBRIDGE	UB10	01895	TQ075855
Ilford	Redbridge	ILFORD	IG1	020	TQ445865
Isle of Dogs	Tower Hamlets	LONDON	E14	020	TQ375785
Isleworth	Hounslow	ISLEWORTH	TW7	020	TQ155755
Islington	Islington	LONDON	N1	020	TQ315845
Kenley	Croydon	KENLEY	CR8	020	TQ327600
Kennington	Lambeth, Southwark	LONDON	SE11	020	TQ305775
Kensal Green	Brent	LONDON	NW10, NW6	020	TQ235825
Kensington	Kensington and Chelsea	LONDON	SW7	020	TQ255795
Kentish Town	Camden	LONDON	NW5	020	TQ285845
Kenton	Brent, Harrow	HARROW	HA3	020	TQ175885
Keston	Bromley	KESTON	BR2	01698	TQ415645
Kevington	Bromley	ORPINGTON	BR5	01689	TQ420651
Kew	Richmond upon Thames	RICHMOND	TW9	020	TQ195775
Kidbrooke	Greenwich	LONDON	SE3	020	TQ415765
Kilburn	Brent, Camden, Westminster	LONDON	NW6	020	TQ245835
King's Cross	Camden	LONDON	N1, N1C, NW1, WC1	020	TQ301834
Kingsbury	Brent	LONDON	NW9	020	TQ195885
Kingston Vale	Kingston upon Thames	LONDON	SW15	020	TQ215715
Kingston upon Thames	Kingston upon Thames	KINGSTON UPON THAMES	KT1, KT2	020	TQ182693
Knightsbridge	Westminster	LONDON	SW1	020	TQ275795
Ladywell	Lewisham	LONDON	SE4, SE13	020	TQ378746
Lambeth	Lambeth	LONDON	SE1	020	TQ305785
Lamorbey	Bexley	SIDCUP	DA15	020	TQ460728
Lampton	Hounslow	HOUNSLOW	TW4	020	TQ135765
Lea Bridge	Hackney	LONDON	E10	020	TQ355865
Leamouth	Tower Hamlets	LONDON	E14	020	TQ394807
Leaves Green	Bromley	KESTON	BR2	01689	TQ414616
Lee	Lewisham	LONDON	SE12	020	TQ395745
Lessness Heath	Bexley	BELVEDERE	DA17	020	TQ499781
Lewisham	Lewisham	LONDON	SE13	020	TQ385755
Leyton	Waltham Forest	LONDON	E10, E15	020	TQ375865
Leytonstone	Waltham Forest	LONDON	E11	020	TQ395875
Limehouse	Tower Hamlets	LONDON	E14	020	TQ365815
Lisson Grove	Westminster	LONDON	NW8	020	TQ275825
Little Ilford	Newham	LONDON	E12	020	TQ435855
Little Venice	Westminster	LONDON	W9, W2	020	TQ262818
Locksbottom	Bromley	ORPINGTON	BR6	01689	TQ435655
Longford	Hillingdon	WEST DRAYTON	UB7	01753	TQ045765
Longlands	Bexley	LONDON, SIDCUP	SE9, DA14, DA15	020	TQ449722
Lower Clapton	Hackney	LONDON	E5	020	TQ355855
Lower Morden	Merton	MORDEN	SM4	020	TQ238670
Loxford	Redbridge	ILFORD	IG1	020	TQ441854
Luxted	Bromley	ORPINGTON	BR6	01959	TQ432604
Maida Vale	Westminster	LONDON	W9	020	TQ255825
Malden Rushett	Kingston upon Thames	CHESSINGTON	KT9	020	TQ171610
Manor House	Hackney	LONDON	N4	020	TQ320876
Manor Park	Newham	LONDON	E12	020	TQ425855
Marks Gate	Barking and Dagenham	ROMFORD	RM6	020	TQ485905
Maryland	Newham	LONDON	E15	020	TQ391849
Marylebone (also St Marylebone)	Westminster	LONDON	W1	020	TQ285815
Mayfair	Westminster	LONDON	W1	020	TQ285805
Maze Hill	Greenwich	LONDON	SE10	020	TQ402780
Merton Park	Merton	LONDON	SW19	020	TQ250695
Middle Park	Greenwich	LONDON	SE9	020	TQ417738
Mile End	Tower Hamlets	LONDON	E1	020	TQ365825
Mill Hill	Barnet	LONDON	NW7	020	TQ225925
Millbank	Westminster	LONDON	SW1	020	TQ295795
Millwall	Tower Hamlets	LONDON	E14	020	TQ375785
Mitcham	Merton	MITCHAM	CR4	020	TQ285685
Monken Hadley	Barnet	BARNET	EN5	020	TQ245975
Morden	Merton	MORDEN	SM4	020	TQ255685
Morden Park	Merton	MORDEN	SM4	020	TQ248676
Mortlake	Richmond upon Thames	LONDON	SW14	020	TQ205755
Motspur Park	Kingston upon Thames	NEW MALDEN	KT3	020	TQ225677
Mottingham	Bromley, Greenwich, Lewisham	LONDON	SE9	020	TQ415725
Muswell Hill	Haringey, Barnet	LONDON	N10	020	TQ287897
Neasden	Brent	LONDON	NW2, NW10	020	TQ215855
New Addington	Croydon	CROYDON	CR0	020	TQ382622
New Barnet	Barnet	BARNET	EN4, EN5	020	TQ265955
New Cross	Lewisham	LONDON	SE14	020	TQ365765
New Eltham	Greenwich	LONDON	SE9	020	TQ440730
New Malden	Kingston upon Thames	NEW MALDEN	KT3	020	TQ215685
New Southgate	Barnet	LONDON	N11	020	TQ295925
Newbury Park	Redbridge	ILFORD	IG2	020	TQ445885
Newington	Southwark	LONDON	SE1, SE17	020	TQ325795
Nine Elms	Wandsworth	LONDON	SW8	020	TQ295775
Noak Hill	Havering	ROMFORD	RM3, RM4	01708	TQ545935
Norbiton	Kingston upon Thames	KINGSTON UPON THAMES	KT1	020	TQ195695
Norbury	Croydon	LONDON	SW16	020	TQ315695
North Cray	Bexley	SIDCUP	DA14	020	TQ488722
North End	Bexley	ERITH	DA8	01322	TQ525765
North End	Camden	LONDON	NW3	020	TQ261869
North Finchley	Barnet	LONDON	N12	020	TQ265925
North Harrow	Harrow	HARROW	HA1, HA2	020	TQ135885
North Kensington	Kensington and Chelsea	LONDON	W10, W11	020	TQ239821
North Ockendon	Havering	UPMINSTER	RM14	01708	TQ595855
North Sheen	Richmond upon Thames	RICHMOND	TW9	020	TQ195765
North Woolwich	Newham	LONDON	E16	020	TQ435795
Northolt	Ealing	NORTHOLT	UB5	020	TQ135845
Northumberland Heath	Bexley	ERITH	DA8	01322	TQ505771
Northumberland Park	Haringey	LONDON	N17	020	TQ345910
Northwood	Hillingdon	NORTHWOOD	HA6	01923	TQ095915
Norwood Green	Ealing	SOUTHALL	UB2	020	TQ135785
Notting Hill	Kensington and Chelsea	LONDON	W11	020	TQ245805
Nunhead	Southwark	LONDON	SE15	020	TQ355755
Oakleigh Park	Barnet	LONDON	N20	020	TQ265935
Old Chiswick	Hounslow	LONDON	W4	020	TQ214778
Old Coulsdon	Croydon	COULSDON	CR5	01737	TQ315575
Old Ford	Tower Hamlets	LONDON	E3	020	TQ365835
Old Malden	Kingston upon Thames	WORCESTER PARK	KT4	020	TQ215685
Old Oak Common	Hammersmith and Fulham	LONDON	NW10	020	TQ216823
Orpington	Bromley	ORPINGTON	BR5, BR6	01689	TQ460660
Osidge	Barnet	LONDON	N14	020	TQ285945
Osterley	Hounslow	ISLEWORTH	TW7	020	TQ145775
Oval	Lambeth	LONDON	SW8, SW9, SE11	020	TQ315575
Paddington	Westminster	LONDON	W2	020	TQ267814
Palmers Green	Enfield	LONDON	N13	020	TQ305935
Park Royal	Brent, Ealing	LONDON	NW10	020	TQ195828
Parsons Green	Hammersmith and Fulham	LONDON	SW6	020	TQ255765
Peckham	Southwark	LONDON	SE15	020	TQ345765
Penge	Bromley	LONDON	SE20	020	TQ345705
Pentonville	Islington	LONDON	N1	020	TQ311830
Perivale	Ealing	GREENFORD	UB6	020	TQ165835
Petersham	Richmond upon Thames	RICHMOND	TW10	020	TQ175735
Petts Wood	Bromley	ORPINGTON	BR5	01689	TQ445675
Pimlico	Westminster	LONDON	SW1	020	TQ295785
Pinner	Harrow	PINNER	HA5	020	TQ115895
Plaistow	Newham	LONDON	E13	020	TQ405825
Plaistow	Bromley	BROMLEY	BR1	020	TQ405705
Plumstead	Greenwich	LONDON	SE18	020	TQ445785
Ponders End	Enfield	ENFIELD	EN1, EN3	020	TQ355955
Poplar	Tower Hamlets	LONDON	E14	020	TQ375805
Pratt's Bottom	Bromley	ORPINGTON	BR6	01689	TQ471622
Preston	Brent	WEMBLEY	HA9	020	TQ179874
Primrose Hill	Camden	LONDON	NW1, NW3, NW8	020	TQ282838
Purley	Croydon	PURLEY	CR8	020	TQ313615
Putney	Wandsworth	LONDON	SW15	020	TQ235755
Queen's Park	Brent, Westminster	LONDON	NW6	020	TQ246832
Queensbury	Harrow, Brent	HARROW, STANMORE, EDGWARE, LONDON	HA3, HA7, HA8, NW9	020	TQ185895
Rainham	Havering	RAINHAM	RM13	01708	TQ525825
Ratcliff	Tower Hamlets	LONDON	E1	020	TQ355805
Rayners Lane	Harrow	PINNER	HA5	020	TQ128873
Raynes Park	Merton	LONDON	SW20	020	TQ235685
Redbridge	Redbridge	ILFORD	IG4	020	TQ425885
Richmond	Richmond upon Thames	RICHMOND	TW9, TW10	020	TQ185745
Riddlesdown	Croydon	PURLEY	CR8	020	TQ327608
Roehampton	Wandsworth	LONDON	SW15	020	TQ225745
Romford	Havering	ROMFORD	RM1	01708	TQ510887
Rotherhithe	Southwark	LONDON	SE16	020	TQ358796
Ruislip	Hillingdon	RUISLIP	HA4	01895	TQ085875
Rush Green	Barking and Dagenham, Havering	ROMFORD	RM7	020, 01708	TQ505875
Ruxley	Bexley, Bromley	SIDCUP, ORPINGTON	DA14, BR5	020, 01689	TQ485704
Sanderstead	Croydon	SOUTH CROYDON	CR2	020	TQ337613
Sands End	Hammersmith and Fulham	LONDON	SW6	020	TQ265765
Selhurst	Croydon	LONDON	SE25	020	TQ340684
Selsdon	Croydon	SOUTH CROYDON	CR2	020	TQ355625
Seven Kings	Redbridge	ILFORD	IG3	020	TQ455875
Seven Sisters	Haringey	LONDON	N15	020	TQ334888
Shacklewell	Hackney	LONDON	E8, N16	020	TQ335855
Shadwell	Tower Hamlets	LONDON	E1	020	TQ355805
Shepherd's Bush	Hammersmith and Fulham	LONDON	W12	020	TQ235798
Shirley	Croydon	CROYDON	CR0	020	TQ361658
Shooter's Hill	Greenwich	LONDON	SE18	020	TQ435765
Shoreditch	Hackney	LONDON	N1	020	TQ334822
Sidcup	Bexley	SIDCUP	DA14, DA15	020	TQ461718
Silvertown	Newham	LONDON	E16	020	TQ415795
Single Street	Bromley	WESTERHAM	TN16	01959	TQ435597
Sipson	Hillingdon	WEST DRAYTON	UB7	020	TQ075785
Slade Green	Bexley	ERITH	DA8	01322	TQ525765
Snaresbrook	Redbridge, Waltham Forest	LONDON	E11	020	TQ395895
Soho	Westminster	LONDON	W1	020	TQ295815
Somers Town	Camden	LONDON	NW1	020	TQ295825
South Croydon	Croydon	SOUTH CROYDON	CR2	020	TQ325633
South Hackney	Hackney	LONDON	E9	020	TQ355845
South Harrow	Harrow	HARROW	HA2	020	TQ143863
South Hornchurch	Havering	RAINHAM	RM13	01708	TQ515835
South Kensington	Kensington and Chelsea	LONDON	SW7, SW3, SW5	020	TQ265785
South Norwood	Croydon	LONDON	SE25	020	TQ340684
South Ruislip	Hillingdon	RUISLIP	HA4	01895, 020	TQ115855
South Street	Bromley	WESTERHAM	TN16	01959	TQ430574
South Wimbledon	Merton	LONDON	SW19	020	TQ255705
South Woodford	Redbridge	LONDON	E18	020	TQ405905
South Tottenham	Haringey	LONDON	N15, N17	020	TQ335885
Southend	Lewisham	LONDON	SE6	020	TQ373721
Southall	Ealing	SOUTHALL	UB1, UB2	020	TQ125805
Southborough	Bromley	BROMLEY	BR2	020	TQ423676
Southfields	Wandsworth	LONDON	SW18, SW19	020	TQ255735
Southgate	Enfield	LONDON	N14	020	TQ296942
Southwark	Southwark	LONDON	SE1	020	TQ325795
Spitalfields	Tower Hamlets	LONDON	E1	020	TQ335815
St Helier	Merton	MORDEN	SM4	020	TQ265664
St James's	Westminster	LONDON	SW1	020	TQ295805
St Margarets	Richmond upon Thames	TWICKENHAM	TW1	020	TQ168742
St Giles	Camden	LONDON	WC2	020	TQ305815
St Johns	Lewisham	LONDON	SE4	020	TQ375765
St John's Wood	Westminster	LONDON	NW8	020	TQ265835
St Luke's	Islington	LONDON	EC1	020	TQ324824
St Mary Cray	Bromley	ORPINGTON	BR5	01689	TQ466680
St Pancras	Camden	LONDON	WC1	020	TQ301825
St Paul's Cray	Bromley	ORPINGTON	BR5	01689	TQ466688
Stamford Hill	Hackney	LONDON	N15, N16	020	TQ335875
Stanmore	Harrow	STANMORE	HA7	020	TQ195885
Stepney	Tower Hamlets	LONDON	E1	020	TQ355814
Stockwell	Lambeth	LONDON	SW8, SW9	020	TQ305755
Stoke Newington	Hackney	LONDON	N16	020	TQ335865
Stonebridge	Brent	LONDON	NW10	020	TQ203839
Stratford	Newham	LONDON	E15	020	TQ385845
Stratford City	Newham	LONDON	E15, E20	020	TQ380849
Strawberry Hill	Richmond upon Thames	TWICKENHAM	TW1, TW2	020	TQ155725
Streatham	Lambeth	LONDON	SW16	020	TQ305715
Stroud Green	Haringey	LONDON	N4	020	TQ311881
Sudbury	Brent, Ealing, Harrow	HARROW, WEMBLEY	HA0, HA1	020	TQ165852
Sundridge	Bromley	BROMLEY	BR1	020	TQ406702
Surbiton	Kingston upon Thames	SURBITON	KT5, KT6	020	TQ180673
Surrey Quays	Southwark	LONDON	SE16	020	TQ356789
Sutton	Sutton	SUTTON	SM1, SM2	020	TQ255645
Swiss Cottage	Camden	LONDON	NW3	020	TQ266842
Sydenham (also Lower Sydenham, Upper Sydenham)	Lewisham, Bromley	LONDON	SE26	020	TQ352714
Sydenham Hill	Lewisham, Southwark	LONDON	SE21, SE26	020	TQ352714
Teddington	Richmond upon Thames	TEDDINGTON	TW11	020	TQ159708
Temple	City, Westminster	LONDON	EC4, WC2	020	TQ311809
Temple Fortune	Barnet	BARNET	NW11	020	TQ245955
Thamesmead	Bexley, Greenwich	LONDON, ERITH	SE28, SE2, DA18	020	TQ475805
Thames View	Barking and Dagenham	BARKING	IG11	020	TQ461831
Thornton Heath	Croydon	THORNTON HEATH	CR7	020	TQ315685
Tokyngton	Brent	WEMBLEY	HA9	020	TQ195845
Tolworth	Kingston upon Thames	SURBITON	KT5, KT6	020	TQ197659
Tooting	Wandsworth	LONDON	SW17	020	TQ275715
Tooting Bec	Wandsworth	LONDON	SW17	020	TQ275715
Tottenham	Haringey	LONDON	N15, N17	020	TQ335905
Tottenham Green	Haringey	LONDON	N15	020	TQ337892
Tottenham Hale	Haringey	LONDON	N15, N17	020	TQ345895
Totteridge	Barnet	LONDON	N20	020	TQ245945
Tower Hill	Tower Hamlets	LONDON	EC3	020	TQ333806
Tufnell Park	Islington	LONDON	N7, N19	020	TQ295855
Tulse Hill	Lambeth	LONDON	SW2, SE27	020	TQ315735
Turnpike Lane	Haringey	LONDON	N8	020	TQ305905
Twickenham	Richmond upon Thames	TWICKENHAM	TW1, TW2	020	TQ155735
Upminster	Havering	UPMINSTER	RM14	01708	TQ560865
Upminster Bridge	Havering	HORNCHURCH	RM12	01708	TQ552867
Upney	Barking and Dagenham	BARKING	IG11	020	TQ455845
Upper Clapton	Hackney	LONDON	E5	020	TQ345875
Upper Holloway	Islington	LONDON	N19	020	TQ297867
Upper Norwood	Croydon	LONDON	SE19	020	TQ329707
Upper Ruxley	Bexley, Bromley	SIDCUP, ORPINGTON	DA14, BR5	020, 01689	TQ4970
Upper Walthamstow	Waltham Forest	LONDON	E17	020	TQ385895
Upton	Bexley	BEXLEYHEATH	DA6	020	TQ485755
Upton Park	Newham	LONDON	E6, E13	020	TQ405837
Uxbridge	Hillingdon	UXBRIDGE	UB8	01895	TQ055835
Vauxhall	Lambeth	LONDON	SW8	020	TQ305785
Waddon	Croydon	CROYDON	CR0	020	TQ315645
Wallington	Sutton	WALLINGTON	SM6	020	TQ294645
Walthamstow	Waltham Forest	LONDON	E17	020	TQ375865
Walthamstow Village	Waltham Forest	LONDON	E17	020	TQ385895
Walworth	Southwark	LONDON	SE17	020	TQ325785
Wandsworth	Wandsworth	LONDON	SW18	020	TQ255755
Wanstead	Redbridge	LONDON	E11	020	TQ405885
Wapping	Tower Hamlets	LONDON	E1	020	TQ345805
Wealdstone	Harrow	HARROW	HA3	020	TQ155895
Well Hall	Greenwich	LONDON	SE9	020	TQ425751
Welling	Bexley	WELLING	DA16	020	TQ465755
Wembley	Brent	WEMBLEY	HA0, HA9	020	TQ175855
Wembley Park	Brent	WEMBLEY	HA9	020	TQ192863
Wennington	Havering	RAINHAM	RM13	01708	TQ545805
West Brompton	Kensington and Chelsea	LONDON	SW10	020	TQ253779
West Drayton	Hillingdon	WEST DRAYTON	UB7	01895	TQ065795
West Dulwich	Lambeth, Southwark	LONDON	SE21	020	TQ325725
West Ealing	Ealing	LONDON	W13	020	TQ153802
West Green	Haringey	LONDON	N15	020	TQ324892
West Hackney	Hackney	LONDON	N16	020	TQ340865
West Ham	Newham	LONDON	E13, E15	020	TQ405837
West Hampstead	Camden	LONDON	NW6	020	TQ255855
West Harrow	Harrow	HARROW	HA2	020	TQ145875
West Heath	Bexley	LONDON	SE2	020	TQ475775
West Hendon	Barnet	LONDON	NW9	020	TQ215885
West Kensington	Hammersmith and Fulham	LONDON	W14	020	TQ246783
West Norwood	Lambeth	LONDON	SE27	020	TQ325715
West Wickham	Bromley	WEST WICKHAM	BR4	020	TQ379660
Westcombe Park	Greenwich	LONDON	SE3	020	TQ402780
Westminster	Westminster	LONDON	SW1	020	TQ295795
Whetstone	Barnet	LONDON	N20	020	TQ265935
White City	Hammersmith and Fulham	LONDON	W12	020	TQ233807
Whitechapel	Tower Hamlets	LONDON	E1	020	TQ335815
Widmore (also Widmore Green)	Bromley	BROMLEY	BR1	020	TQ411691
Whitton	Richmond upon Thames	TWICKENHAM	TW2	020	TQ145735
Willesden	Brent	LONDON	NW10	020	TQ227846
Wimbledon	Merton	LONDON	SW19, SW20	020	TQ239709
Winchmore Hill	Enfield	LONDON	N21	020	TQ315945
Wood Green	Haringey	LONDON	N22	020	TQ305905
Woodford	Redbridge	WOODFORD GREEN, LONDON	IG8, E18	020	TQ405915
Woodford Bridge	Redbridge	WOODFORD GREEN	IG8	020	TQ423917
Woodford Wells	Redbridge	WOODFORD GREEN	IG8	020	TQ404927
Woodford Green	Redbridge	WOODFORD GREEN	IG8	020	TQ405915
Woodlands	Hounslow	ISLEWORTH	TW7	020	TQ155755
Woodside	Croydon	CROYDON	CR0	020	TQ344672
Woodside Park	Barnet	LONDON	N12	020	TQ256925
Woolwich	Greenwich	LONDON	SE18	020	TQ435795
Worcester Park	Sutton, Kingston upon Thames	WORCESTER PARK	KT4	020	TQ225655
Wormwood Scrubs	Hammersmith and Fulham	LONDON	W12	020	TQ225815
Yeading	Hillingdon	HAYES	UB4	020	TQ115825
Yiewsley	Hillingdon	WEST DRAYTON	UB7	020	TQ063804

== See also ==
- List of places in London
- List of London postcode districts
- List of electoral wards in Greater London
- List of civil parishes in Greater London
