= Greater London Built-up Area =

Conurbation in south-east England

Coordinates: 51.5075°N 0.1275°W

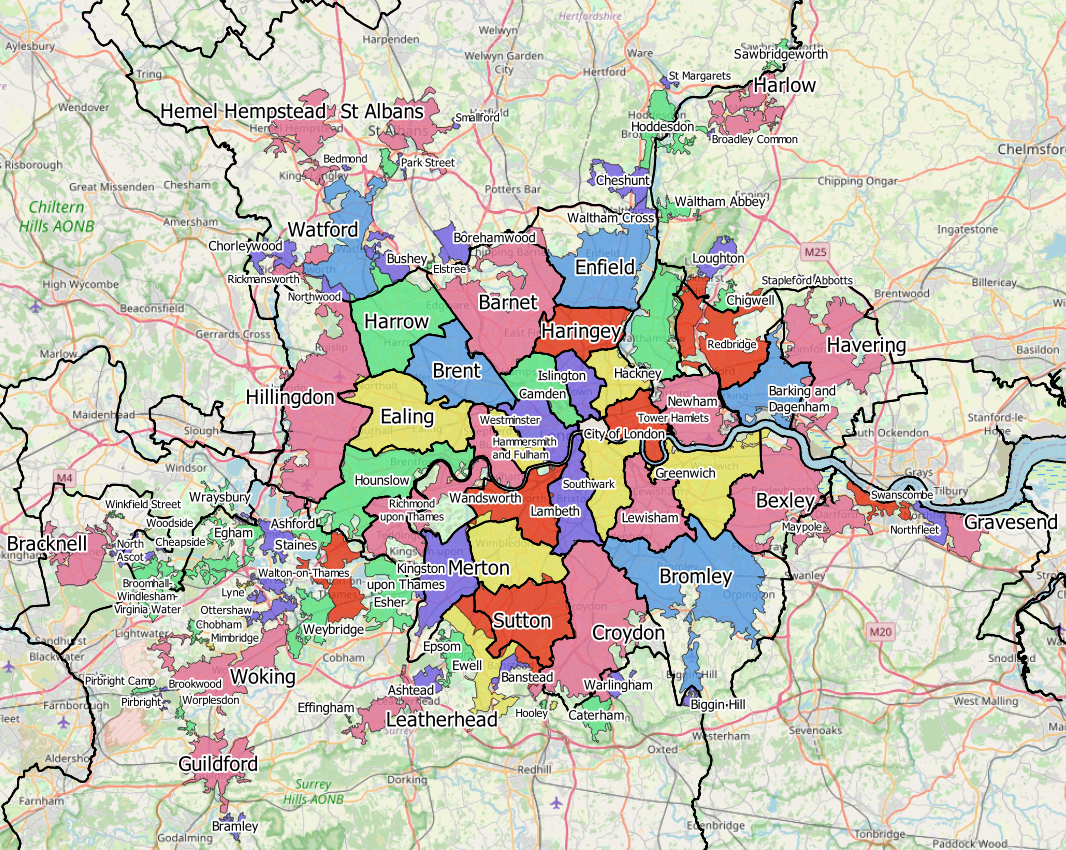
A labelled map of the Greater London Built-up Area with administrative borders

The Greater London Built-up Area, or Greater London Urban Area, is a conurbation in south-east England that constitutes the continuous urban sprawl of London, and includes surrounding adjacent urban towns as defined by the Office for National Statistics. It is the largest urban area in the United Kingdom with a population of 9,787,426 in 2011.

== Overview ==
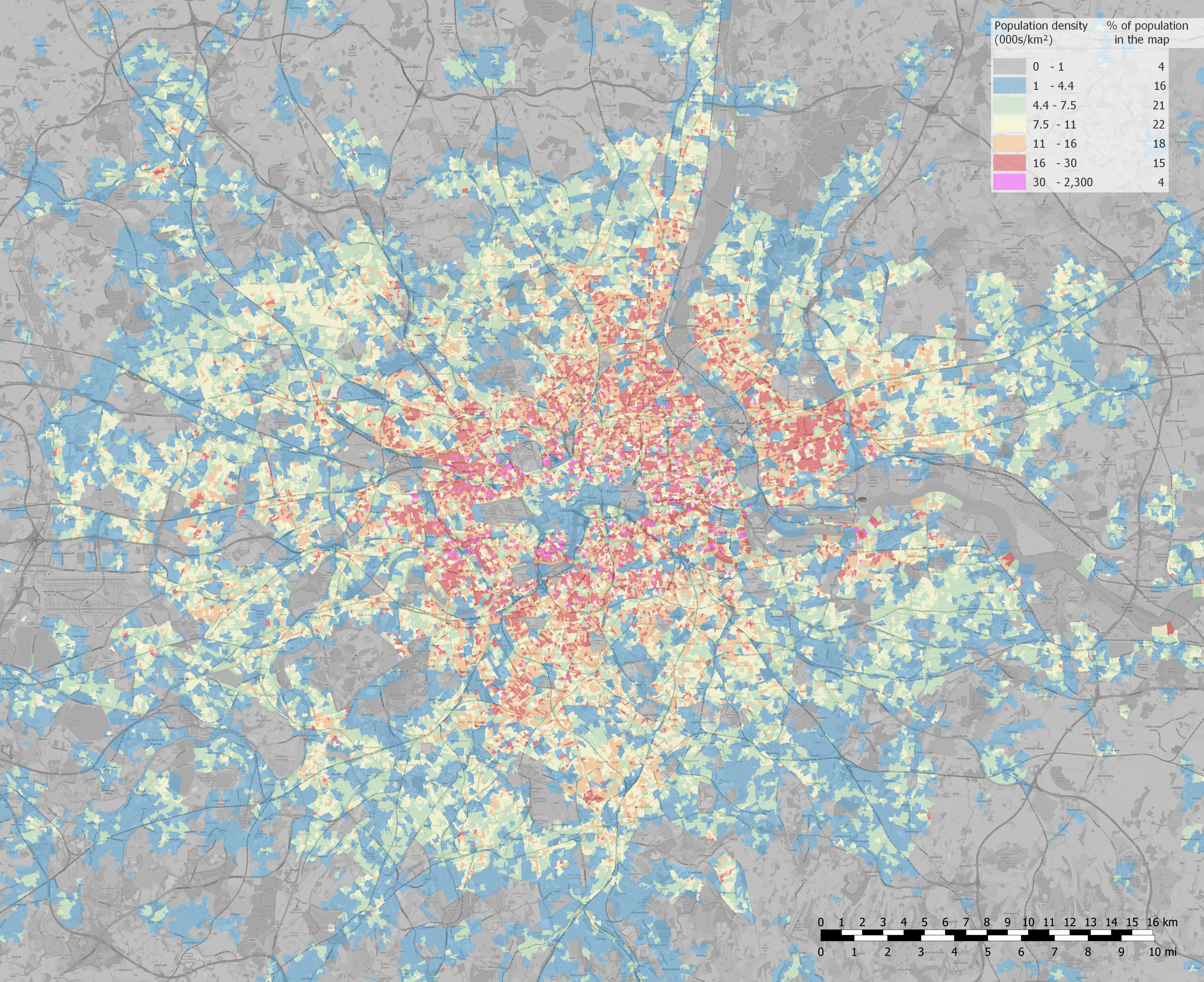
Population density map

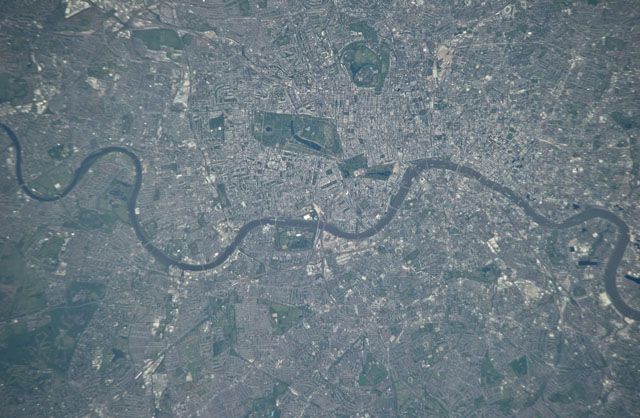
Satellite view of the inner parts of the Greater London Built-up Area

The Greater London Built-up or Urban Area had a population of 9,787,426 and occupied an area of 1,737.9 square kilometres (671.0 sq mi) at the time of the 2011 census.

It includes most of the London region – omitting most of its woodland; small, buffered districts; the Lee Valley Park; and the two largest sewage treatment works serving London by the River Thames. Outside the region's administrative boundary, it includes contiguous suburban settlements and a few densely populated outliers connected to it by ribbon development. Its outer boundary is constrained by the Metropolitan Green Belt and it is therefore much smaller than the wider metropolitan area of London.

As a selective grouping of relatively low- to mid-density (and some high-density) output areas, each consisting of roughly 120 households, it can be compared to the London region, which covers 1,572 square kilometres (607 sq mi) and contained 8,173,194 residents at the time of the 2011 census.

The built-up area of the Greater London region continues beyond the region's administrative boundary in some places, while stopping short of it in others. For this reason, the density of the Greater London Built-Up Area is 8.3% higher than that of Greater London, the figure for which includes these outlying rural areas (notably in Hillingdon, Enfield, Havering and Bromley). All of both areas are drained ultimately by the River Thames. The area uses around 4 gigawatts of electricity power.

== History ==
The density gradient of industrialising cities has tended to follow a specific pattern: the density of the centre of the city would rise during urbanisation and the population would remain heavily concentrated in the city centre with a rapid decline in settlement towards the periphery. Then, with continued economic growth and the expanding networks of public transport, people (particularly the middle-class) would then slowly migrate towards the suburbs, gradually softening the population density gradient. This point was generally reached when the city reached a certain stage of economic development. In London, this point was reached in the first half of the nineteenth century, in Paris towards the end of the century and in New York City at the turn of the twentieth.

However, London had been sprawling out of its medieval confines within the City since the eighteenth century, when the city experienced its first great urban surge. Areas to the west of Westminster were increasingly built up for the wealthy, to live in the suburbs of the city.

A dramatic increase in the city's urban sprawl began in the nineteenth century when labourers flocked from the countryside to work in the new factories that were then springing up. Large developments of small terraced houses began to appear and the new public transport systems – (the Tube, buses and trams) – allowed workers to commute into the city daily. Suburban districts also sprung up around the city centre to accommodate those who wanted to escape the squalid conditions of the industrial town.

By the mid-nineteenth century, the first major suburban areas were springing up around London as the city (then the largest in the world) became more overcrowded and unsanitary. A major catalyst in the growth in urban sprawl came from the opening of the Metropolitan Railway in the 1860s. The line joined the capital's financial heart in the City to what were to become the suburbs of Middlesex. Harrow was reached in 1880, and the line eventually extended as far as Verney Junction in Buckinghamshire, more than 50 miles (80 kilometres) from Baker Street and the centre of London.

Unlike other railway companies, which were required to dispose of surplus land, the Met was allowed to retain such land that it believed was necessary for future railway use. (Note: The Lands Clauses Consolidation Act 1845 (8 & 9 Vict. c. 18) required railways to sell off surplus lands within ten years of the time given for completion of the work in the line's enabling Act.) Initially, the surplus land was managed by the Land Committee, and, from the 1880s, the land was developed and sold to domestic buyers in places like Willesden Park Estate, Cecil Park, near Pinner and at Wembley Park. In 1919, with the expectation of a post-war housing boom, Metropolitan Railway Country Estates Limited was formed and went on to develop estates at Kingsbury Garden Village near Neasden, Wembley Park, Cecil Park and Grange Estate at Pinner and the Cedars Estate at Rickmansworth and create places such as Harrow Garden Village.

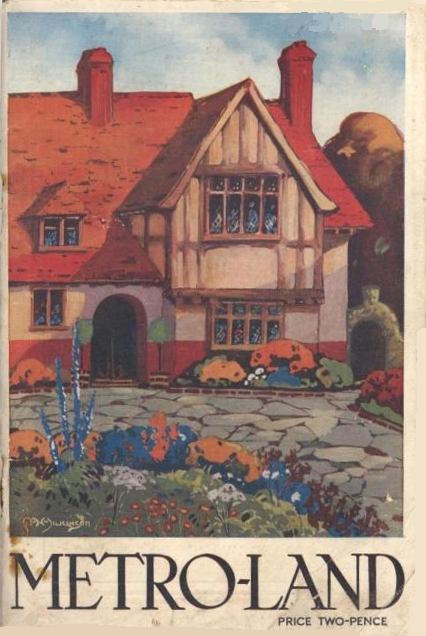
The cover of the Metro-Land guide published in 1921, promoting a suburban lifestyle

By the early twentieth century, amid increasing middle-class affluence, large low-density suburbs of semi-detached houses had sprung up all around the city, doubling the area of built-up London in the interwar period alone, even though the city's population only increased by 10% in the same time. H. G. Wells even predicted in 1902 that within a hundred years most of southern England would have been subsumed into one gigantic conurbation centred in London.

== 2011 Census subdivisions ==
At the time of the 2011 Census, the Office for National Statistics defined the Greater London Urban Area as being made up of the following components:

=== London region ===
The London region consists of 33 districts: the City of London, the 12 Inner London boroughs (including the City of Westminster), and the 20 Outer London boroughs.

- Barking and Dagenham
- Barnet
- Bexley
- Brent
- Bromley
- Camden
- City of London
- City of Westminster
- Croydon
- Ealing
- Enfield
- Greenwich
- Hackney
- Hammersmith and Fulham
- Haringey
- Harrow
- Havering
- Hillingdon
- Hounslow
- Islington
- Kensington and Chelsea
- Kingston upon Thames
- Lambeth
- Lewisham
- Merton
- Newham
- Redbridge
- Richmond upon Thames
- Southwark
- Sutton
- Tower Hamlets
- Waltham Forest
- Wandsworth

=== Surrey ===
- Addlestone
- Ashford
- Ashtead
- Banstead
- Bramley
- Brookwood
- Broomhall/Windlesham/Virginia Water
- Caterham
- Chertsey
- Chobham
- Claygate
- Cobham
- Effingham
- Egham
- Epsom
- Esher
- Ewell
- Guildford
- Hooley
- Leatherhead
- Lyne
- Mimbridge
- Molesey
- Netherne-on-the-Hill
- Ottershaw
- Pirbright
- Pirbright Camp
- Shepperton
- Staines-upon-Thames
- Sunbury
- Walton-on-Thames
- Warlingham
- Weybridge
- Woking
- Worplesdon

=== Hertfordshire ===
- Bedmond
- Borehamwood
- Bushey
- Cheshunt
- Chorleywood
- Elstree
- Hemel Hempstead
- Hoddesdon
- How Wood
- Northwood
- Park Street
- Rickmansworth
- Sawbridgeworth
- Smallford
- St Albans
- St Margarets
- Waltham Cross
- Watford

=== Berkshire ===
- Binfield
- Bracknell
- Cheapside
- North Ascot
- Winkfield Street
- Woodside
- Wraysbury

=== Essex ===
- Broadley Common
- Chigwell
- Harlow
- Loughton
- Stapleford Abbotts
- Waltham Abbey

=== Kent ===
- Dartford
- Gravesend
- Greenhithe
- Maypole
- Northfleet
- Stone
- Swanscombe

== Omitted areas ==
In the 2011 census, the following areas were considered to be built-up areas but outside the Greater London Built-up Area, despite being within Greater London. All of these areas had populations of less than a thousand except New Addington BUA and Harefield BUA which had populations of 22,280 and 6,573 respectively. Note that these are Built-up areas as defined by Office for National Statistics and will have different boundaries from the settlements after which they are named.

- Berry's Green
- Crews Hill
- Cudham
- Downe
- Harefield
- Hazelwood
- New Addington
- Royal National Orthopaedic Hospital

== 2001 Census subdivisions ==
At the time of the 2001 Census, the Office for National Statistics defined the Greater London Urban Area as being made up of the following components:

=== London region ===
Within the region, there were 33 components corresponding to the City of London and the London boroughs. However, the ONS boundaries are not identical to the local authority boundaries, and outlying areas such as Biggin Hill in Bromley are omitted.

- Barking and Dagenham
- Barnet
- Bexley
- Brent
- Bromley
- Camden
- Croydon
- Ealing
- Enfield
- Greenwich
- Hackney
- Hammersmith and Fulham
- Haringey
- Harrow
- Havering
- Hillingdon
- Hounslow
- Islington
- Kensington and Chelsea
- Kingston upon Thames
- Lambeth
- Lewisham
- City of London
- Merton
- Newham
- Redbridge
- Richmond upon Thames
- Southwark
- Sutton
- Tower Hamlets
- Waltham Forest
- Wandsworth
- Westminster

=== Outside Greater London ===
South East England

- Addlestone
- Banstead / Tadworth
- Caterham and Warlingham
- Chertsey
- Dartford
- Egham
- Epsom and Ewell
- Esher
- Gravesend
- Leatherhead
- Molesey
- Northfleet
- Ottershaw
- Shepperton
- Staines-upon-Thames
- Sunbury
- Sunningdale / Ascot
- Swanscombe
- Virginia Water
- Walton and Weybridge
- West End
- Windlesham
- Woking / Byfleet

East of England

- Bushey
- Cheshunt
- Chigwell
- Chorleywood
- Hemel Hempstead
- Hoddesdon
- Kings Langley
- Loughton
- Rickmansworth
- St Albans
- South Oxhey
- Waltham Abbey
- Watford

== See also ==
- List of urban areas in the United Kingdom
- London metropolitan area
