= Aperfield =

Coordinates: 51.3069°N 0.0448°E

- Hamlet
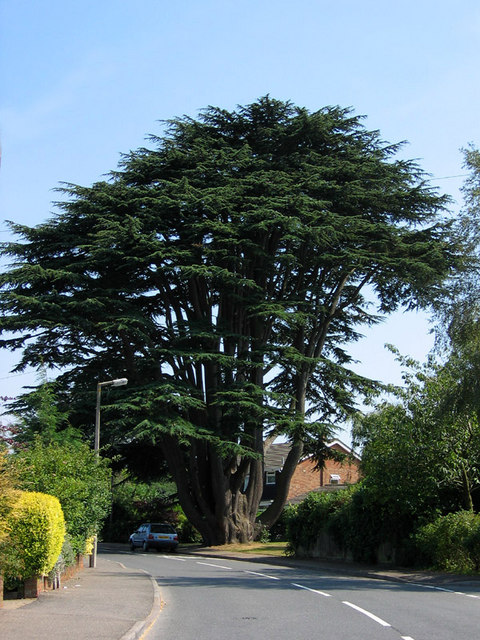
- The Aperfield Cedar

- Location within Greater London
- OS grid reference: TQ425585
- London borough: Bromley
- Ceremonial county: Greater London
- Region: London
- Country: England
- Sovereign state: United Kingdom
- Post town: WESTERHAM
- Postcode district: TN16
- Dialling code: 01959
- Police: Metropolitan
- Fire: London
- Ambulance: London
- UK Parliament: Orpington
- London Assembly: Bexley and Bromley

Aperfield is a hamlet and area in London, England, within the London Borough of Bromley, 16.2 miles (26 km) south-southeast of Charing Cross, and outside London's contiguous built-up area.

It is near Biggin Hill and Berry's Green. The name has its first recorded use in 1242 as Apeldrefeld and means "field where apple trees grow", from the Old English words apuldor and feld.

== Nearest places ==
- Biggin Hill
- Cudham
