= Downe Bank =

UK nature reserve

Coordinates: 51°19′48″N 00°03′48″E

- Site of Special Scientific Interest
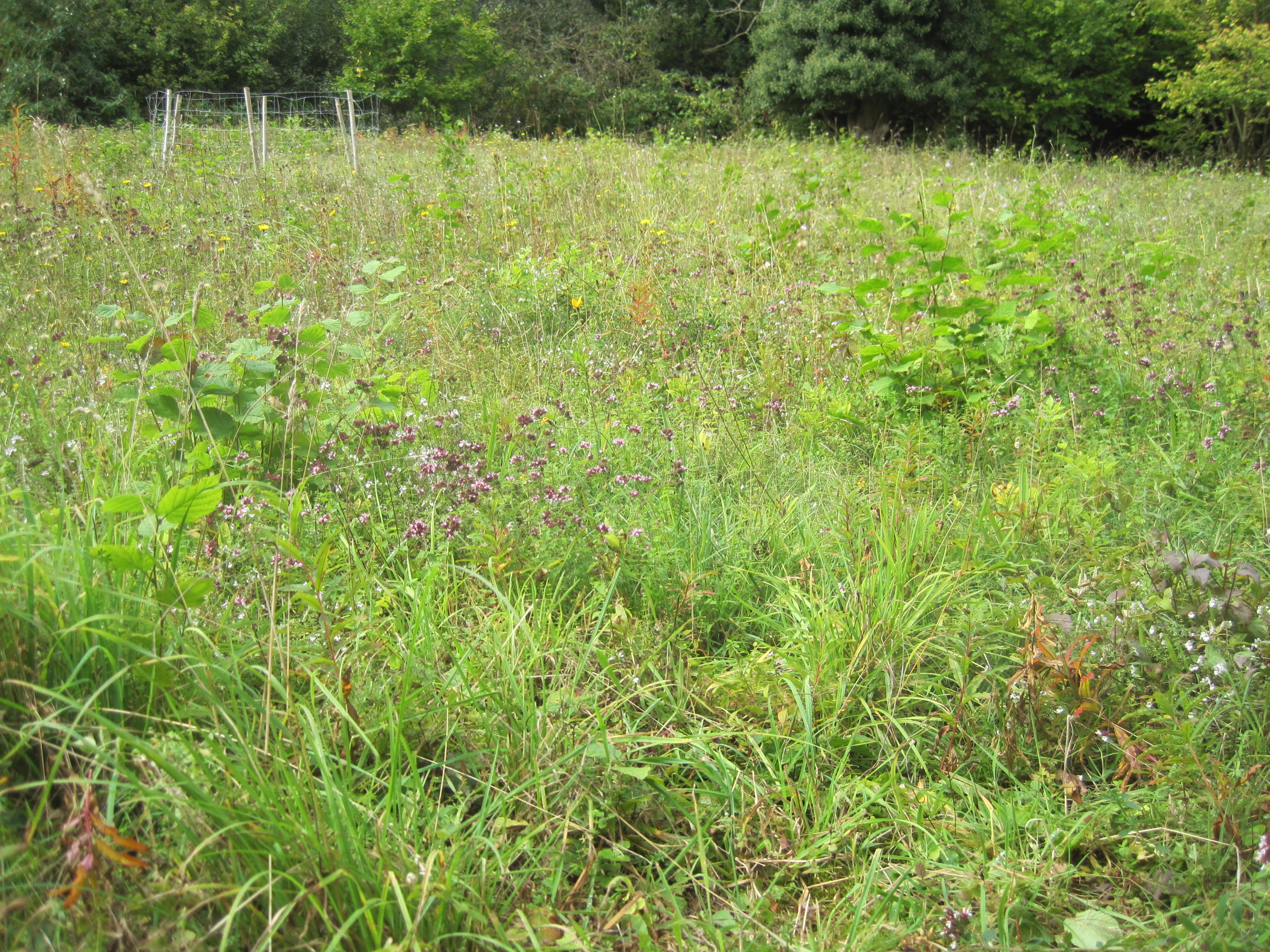
- Flowers in Orchis Bank
- Location of Downe Bank.
- Area of search: Greater London
- Grid reference: TQ438609
- Interest: Biological
- Area: 17.7 ha (44 acres)
- Notification date: 1981
- Location map: Magic Map

Downe Bank is a nature reserve owned and managed by the Kent Wildlife Trust in the North Downs, close to Downe in the London Borough of Bromley. It is a Site of Special Scientific Interest (SSSI) together with the neighbouring High Elms Country Park. Located close to Charles Darwin's home, Down House, it was one of his favourite places and helped to inspire his work.

== The site ==
The Kent Wildlife Trust reserve occupies 5 hectares at grid reference TQ438609, but the SSSI covers a wider area of 17.7 hectares. There is an area of ancient woodland called Hangrove Wood, and chalk downland called 'Rough Pell' on a tythe map of 1840, but known to Darwin as Orchis Bank, because many wild orchids grew there. It has a good diversity of chalk grassland species, including toothwort, adder's tongue and false oxlip. Up to 31 species of birds have been recorded, together with dormice and invertebrates. It is one of the few sites in the area to have remained almost unaltered since Darwin's day, due to the efforts of local naturalists.

Access is by a footpath, which goes through the reserve, between Christmas Tree Farm on Cudham Road in Downe and Overshaws on Cudham Lane near Cudham. The footpath is part of the Cudham Circular Short Walk (not the full Walk). The entrance, which has no car parking, is on Hangrove Hill. The southern part is open to the public, and access to the more important northern part is by prior arrangement with the Trust.

== Charles Darwin ==
Darwin's observations of orchids and their insect pollinators at Orchis Bank provided the evidence for his important book, Fertilisation of Orchids, published in 1862, and experts agree that it inspired his famous conclusion to On the Origin of Species:

It is interesting to contemplate an entangled bank, clothed with many plants of many kinds, with birds singing on the bushes, with various insects flitting about, and with worms crawling through the damp earth, and to reflect that these elaborately constructed forms, so different from each other, and dependent on each other in so complex a manner, have all been produced by laws acting around us .... and that, whilst this planet has gone cycling on according to the fixed law of gravity, from so simple a beginning endless forms most beautiful and most wonderful have been, and are being, evolved.

According to his son, Francis:

Another favourite place was "Orchis Bank," above the quiet Cudham valley, where fly- and musk-orchis grew among the junipers, and Cephalanthera and Neottia under the beech boughs; the little wood "Hangrove," just above this, he was also fond of, and here I remember his collecting grasses, when he took a fancy to make out the names of all the common kinds. He was fond of quoting the saying of one of his little boys, who, having found a grass that his father had not seen before, had it laid by his own plate during dinner, remarking, "I are an extraordinary grass-finder!"

Darwin's daughter, Henrietta Lichfield, wrote:

Just on the other side of the narrow steep little lane leading to the village of Cudham, perched high above the valley, was 'Orchis bank,' where bee, fly, musk, and butterfly orchises grew. This was a grassy terrace under one of the shaws of old beeches, and with a quiet view across the valley, the shingled spire of Cudham church shewing above its old yews.

== World Heritage Site nomination ==
'Darwin's Landscape Laboratory', which included Down House and its gardens and Downe Bank, was the British Government's 2009 nomination for a World Heritage Site, but the application was unsuccessful.

== See also ==
- List of Sites of Special Scientific Interest in London
- Charles Darwin
- Down House
