= Old Jail, Biggin Hill =

Pub in Biggin Hill, London

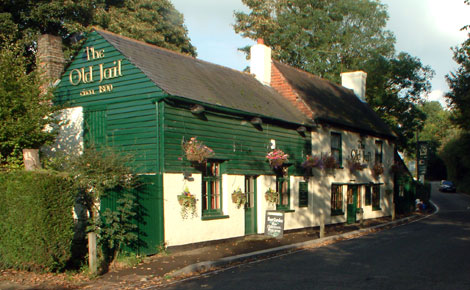
- The Old Jail, Biggin Hill

- Location within London Borough of Bromley Location within Greater London

General information
- Location: Jail Lane, Biggin Hill, Westerham, Kent., London, England
- Coordinates: 51.315222°N 0.0563443°E

Design and construction
- Designations

Listed Building – Grade II
- Official name: Old Jail Public House
- Designated: 29 June 1973
- Reference no.: 1064387

The Old Jail was a pub in Jail Lane, Biggin Hill, Westerham, in the London Borough of Bromley. As ofFebruary 2023, it is permanently closed. Its future use is unknown. It is a Grade II listed building, dating back to the 18th century.

== Partial history ==
The Bromley Borough Local History Society and Biggin Hill History Group assert that it was used to hold French prisoners of war, overnight, during Napolionic times, who were being transported to Maidstone. Also, that it belonged to the 'Fox Brewery', of Green Street Green, which closed, in 1908; and that it was sold by auction on the 15th. June, 1909, to ' Truman, Hanbury and Buxton '.

== Licensees and other titles ==
(Incomplete):-

{The 1869 ' Wine and Beerhouse Act ' made it mandatory for anyone who sold alcohol to hold a licence. This extended to off-licences, an establishment that sold alcohol for consumption off the premises. The title ‘ Off-Licence Keeper ’ was not used in the census returns, or local trade directories; ‘Beer Retailer’ or ' Licensed Victualler ' were the official descriptions: NB: see ' William Lewis ', and ' Cedric Motley ', respectively, below}:-

From The Biggin Hill History Group, (records 33-37); ' Kelly's Directory ', (1903); ' The Dover Kent Archives ', (4/8/'22); others stated below:-

- Edmund Prince, 1851, (labourer, age 24 in 1851 census).
- William Lewis, 1855-61; (Described as " Beer Retailer & Shopkeeper " in the ' Post Office Directory ' & ' Melville's Directory '); (also a farmer, the age given as 55, in the 1861 census): (see ' Census Information ', below).
- Thomas Lewis, 1881-82, (age 44 in 1881 census).
- Richard Cowlard, 1891-1913, (also a baker, age 63 in 1901 census), (' Kelly's Directory of Kent, Surrey, and Sussex ');
- Leon Dupere, 1936.
- Leonard Alfred Dupere, 1939-1961, {Nellie Dupere (wife); their son, John, (16); and Gold L. Fitts, (Domestic)}.
- 1960-1970: Cederic (Bill) Motley, (' Licensed Victualler ', ' London Gazette ', (1/4/'60), managed for ' Ind Coope ', Allied Breweries, Octavius Coope.

== One licensee's census information ==
- William Lewis, ('Beer Retailer & Shopkeeper'), (1855-61):-

'Widow(er ? sic: ?)/55/Chevening, Kent; 1861/Thomas/Son, A labourer/24/Downe, (spelt ' Down ', at the time), Kent; Christopher/Son, Gardener/22/Downe; Sarah/Daughter, Housekeeper/20/Downe; Kezia/Daughter/16/Downe; Ann Elizabeth/Daughter/13/Downe, Kent; 1861/Silas/Son, Brewer/26/Downe, Kent'.

== Court case and sale newspaper reports ==
- From 'The Maidstone Telegraph, Rochester and Chatham Gazette ', Saturday, 25th. February 1860:-

COOK v. LEWIS.

The plaintiff, a shoe-maker at Brasted, sought to recover from the defendant, who keeps the “Old Gaol” beer-house, Cudham, £2 10s. 6d., for goods, &c. It appeared that the plaintiff held a shoe club at the defendant's house, and as the defendant had had some trouble with a previous club, he arranged to receive the money from the members and account for them. In the account were also included some charges for work done for the defendant's family, and for carriage hire.

Defendant denied this liability, and said that he had nothing whatsoever to do with the club.

The court was occupied a considerable time in examining various documents, and judgement was ultimately given for £1 18s. 6d ".

- From 'The Standard' (London, England), Thursday, August 11, 1892; (page. 10; Issue 21248):-

" Preliminary Announcement. - By Order of the Mortgagee.

Fully-Licensed Freehold Inn.

Messrs. Barker, Cathie, and Palmer are instructed to Sell by Auction, at an early date (to be announced in future advertisements), the Valuable Freehold Property, known as the "Old Jail Inn" (fully licensed), Cudham, Kent, together with about eight acres of most productive meadow and market garden land in One Lot. - Auction Offices, 13, Hart-street, Bloomsbury, and (pro tem.) 56, Moorgate-street, E.C. ".

== Historical photos ==
The following link shows further photographic history from 1900-1976:- http://www.dover-kent.com/2014-project-b/Old-Jail-Inn-Biggin-Hill.html
