= Thomas Maurice =

British oriental scholar and historian

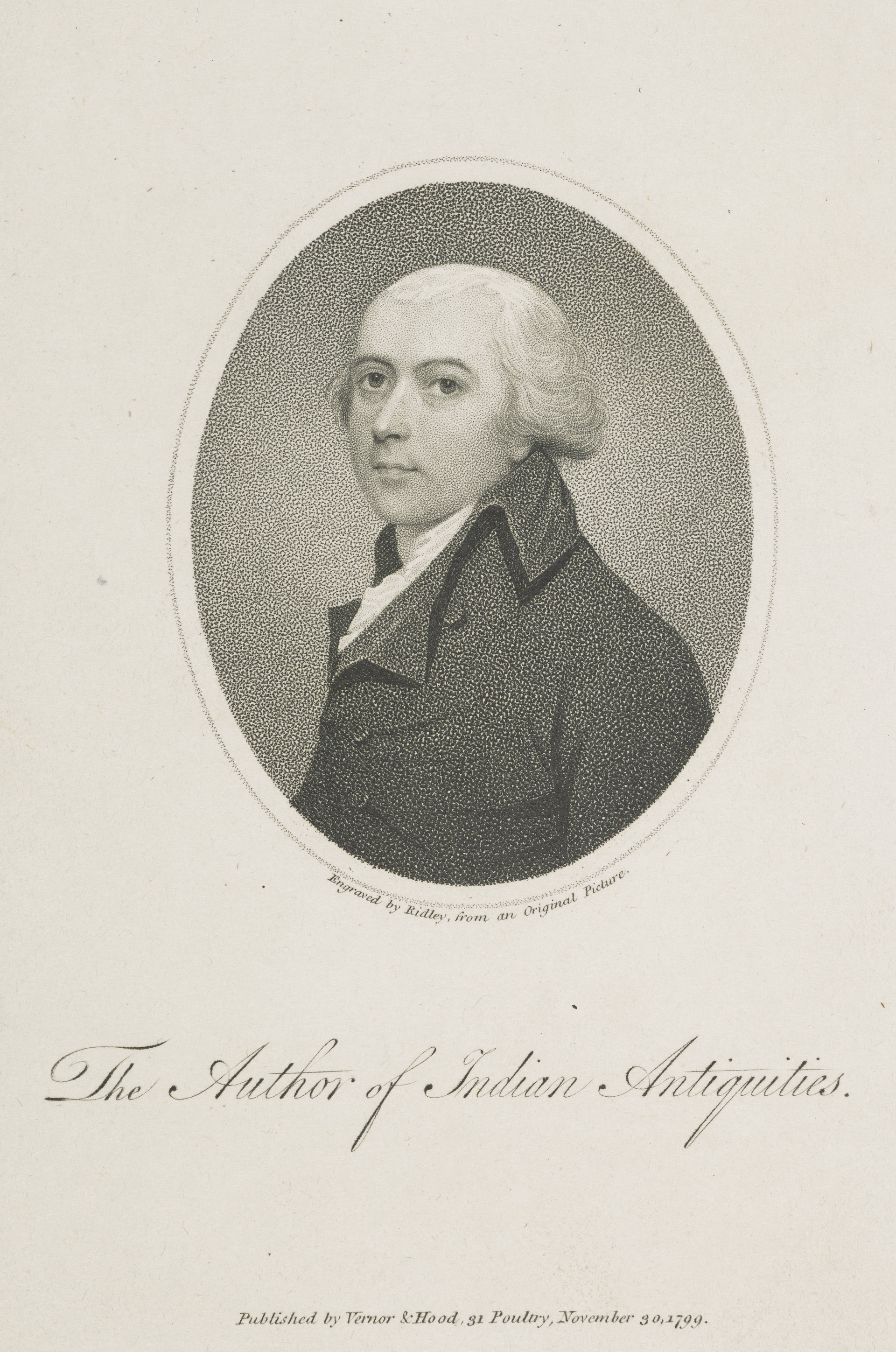
- Born: 25 September 1754; Hertford
- Died: 30 March 1824
- Education: St John's College, University College, Oxford
- Occupations: Historian, librarian, orientalist, museologist
- Employer: British Museum

Thomas Maurice (1754 – 30 March 1824) was a British oriental scholar and historian. The son of a schoolmaster, Maurice was educated at the Wesleyan seminary at Bristol before entering University College, Oxford in 1774, aged 19 (B.A. 1778, M.A. 1808); he was chaplain to the 87th regiment (about 1784), Vicar of Wormleighton, Warwickshire (1798–1824) and Cudham, Kent (1804–24). Maurice was a noted oriental scholar and historian, and assistant-keeper of MSS at the British Museum (1798–24).

== Life ==
Maurice, an English divine and scholar, noted particularly for his studies of the antiquities of India, was born about 1755 at Hertford, where his father was then head-master of the Christ's Hospital school. After his father's death the family was impoverished by an unfortunate marriage of the widow, and his education proceeded irregularly till Dr. Parr, on opening his school at Stanmore, was prevailed on to receive him as a pupil, and treated him with great generosity and kindness. Destined for the Church, he entered at nineteen St. John's College, Oxford, whence he removed next year to University College.

After taking his degree of B.A., he was ordained by bishop Lowth, and held for some time the curacy of the large parish of Woodford, in Essex, which in 1785 he resigned for a chapel at Epping, in order to obtain greater leisure for study. His turn for historical studies had been fostered at University College by his distinguished tutor Lord Stowell, and he now began to concentrate his attention on the history of India, for treating upon which he made proposals in 1790 in a published letter addressed to the East India directors. The irreligious spirit of the French Revolution, alarming Maurice's mind, induced him to remodel his first work after it was nearly completed, and to devote a considerable proportion of it to dissertations on the Hindu mythology. In 1791 he came before the public with two volumes of his Indian Antiquities: the rest were brought out at intervals, the completion of the work being mainly owing to the liberality of the earl of Harborough; and the seventh and last volume appeared in 1797. This work remains to our day a trustworthy book of reference. Meantime he had undertaken a History of Hindostan, the three volumes of which, in quarto, were published in 1795, 1798, 1799, and a second edition appeared in 1821.

In 1798, earl Spencer presented him to the vicarage of Wormleighton, in Warwickshire; next year he was appointed assistant librarian in the British Museum; in 1800 bishop Tomline obtained for him the pension that had been held by the poet Cowper; and in 1804 he received from the lord chancellor the vicarage of Cudham, in Kent. His Modern History of Hindostan, in two volumes, appeared in 1802 and 1804. Several other volumes on Eastern history and theology, and attempts in verse, succeeded this work; and one of his last undertakings was his Memoirs, comprehending the History of the Progress of Indian Literature, and Anecdotes of Literary Characters in Britain, during a Period of Thirty Years. Of this work the three volumes appeared in 1819, 1820, and 1822. He died on 30 March 1824. See English Cyclop. s.v.; Allibone, Dict. of Brit. and Amer. Authors, s.v.; Gorton, Biog. Dict. s.v.

This article incorporates public domain material from McClintock, John; Strong, James (1867–1887). Cyclopædia of Biblical, Theological and Ecclesiastical Literature. Harper and Brothers.

== Text records ==
- 1775 – The School-Boy, a Poem.
- 1777 – A Monody, sacred to the Memory of Elizabeth, Dutchess of Northumberland.
- 1778 – The Oxonian. A Poem.
- 1779 – Hinda; an Eastern Elegy.
- 1784 – Westminster Abbey: an Elegiac Poem.
- 1795 – An Elegiac and Historical Poem, sacred to the Memory and Virtues of the Honourable Sir William Jones.
- 1806 – Verses, being an Apology for the Errors and Eccentricities of Genius.

== Publications ==
- The school-boy, a poem. In imitation of Mr. Phillips's Splendid Shilling. 1775.
- Hagley. A descriptive poem. 1776.
- Netherby: a poem. 1776.
- A monody addressed to the memory of Elizabeth, Duchess of Northumberland. 1777.
- The Oxonian. A poem. 1778.
- Poems and miscellaneous pieces. 1779.
- Westminster Abbey: an elegiac poem. 1784.
- Panthea; or, the Captive bride, a tragedy; founded upon a story in Xenophon. 1789.
- A letter addressed to the ... directors of the East India Company. 1790.
- An elegiac poem, sacred to the memory and virtues of the Honorable Sir William Jones. 1795.
- Indian antiquities. 7 vols, 1793–1800.
- History of Hindustan. 2 vols, 1795–98; 3 vols, 1820.
- The crisis, or the British Muse to the British minister and nation. 1798.
- Sanscreet fragments, or interesting fragments from the sacred books of the Brahmins. 1798.
- Grove hill: a descriptive poem; with an ode to nature. 1799.
- A dissertation on the oriental trinities. 1800.
- Poems, epistolary, lyric, and elegiacal. 1800.
- The modern history of Hindostan. 2 vols, 1802–10.
- Select poems. 1803.
- Elegy on Right Honourable William Pitt. 1806.
- The fall of the Mogul, a tragedy. With other occasional poems. 1806.
- Richmond Hill: a descriptive and historical poem. 1807.
- Elegiac lines, sacred to the memory of Henry Hope. 1811.
- Brahminical fraud detected. 1812.
- Westminster Abbey, with other occasional poems. 1813.
- Observations connected with astronomy and ancient history. 1816.
- Observations on the ruins of Babylon. 1816.
- Observations on the remains of ancient Egyptian grandeur and superstition. 1818.
- Memoirs of the author of Indian antiquities, etc. 3 vols, 1819–22.
- A free translation of the Oedipus Tyrannus of Sophocles. 1822.
