= Luxted =

Hamlet in the London Borough of Bromley, England

Coordinates: 51.328330°N 0.054175°E

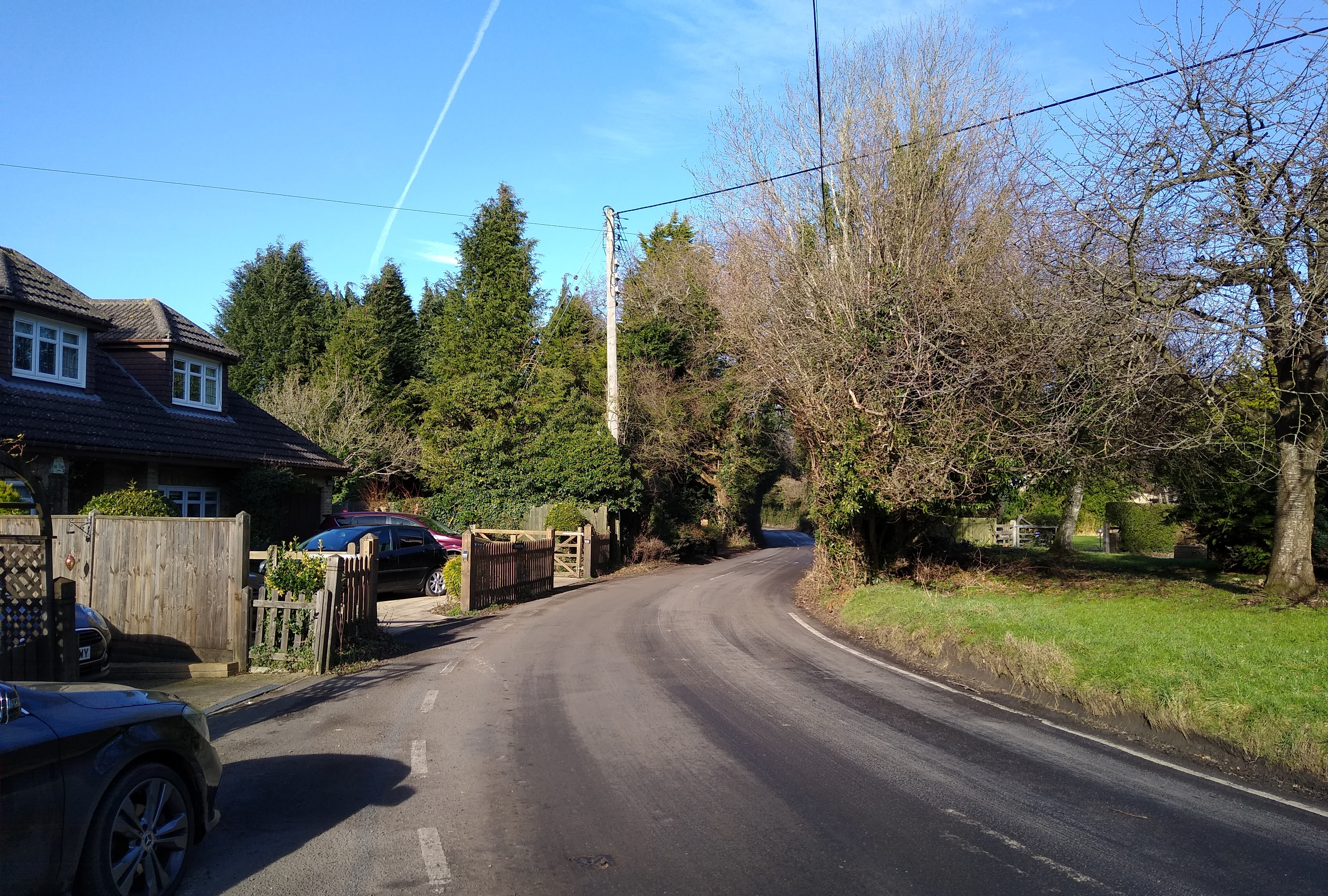
- Luxted Road

- Location within Greater London
- London borough: Bromley
- Ceremonial county: Greater London
- Region: London
- Country: England
- Sovereign state: United Kingdom
- Post town: ORPINGTON
- Postcode district: BR6
- Dialling code: 01959
- Police: Metropolitan
- Fire: London
- Ambulance: London
- London Assembly: Bexley and Bromley

Luxted is a hamlet in the London Borough of Bromley, located to the south of Downe, at grid reference TQ434602. The area is rural, noted for its abundance of woods and grasslands. It is a part of the largest ward in Greater London, the Darwin ward, which also includes Downe, Cudham, Leaves Green, Single Street, Berry's Green, and Westerham Hill.

== Partial History ==
Lord Simon de Manning was a former Lord of the Manor for Kevington, London, (which included Luxted and Berry's Green), and grandson to Rudolf de Manning, (Count Palatine, (who married Elgida, aunt to King Harold 1, (Harold Harefoot), of England; he was the royal Standard Bearer to King Richard the Lionheart. He carried the royal Standard to Jerusalem, in 1190, during the First Crusade. In England, the forms Earl Palatine, and Palatine Earldom, are preferred.
