= Leaves Green =

Coordinates: 51.335384°N 0.02952°E

- Village
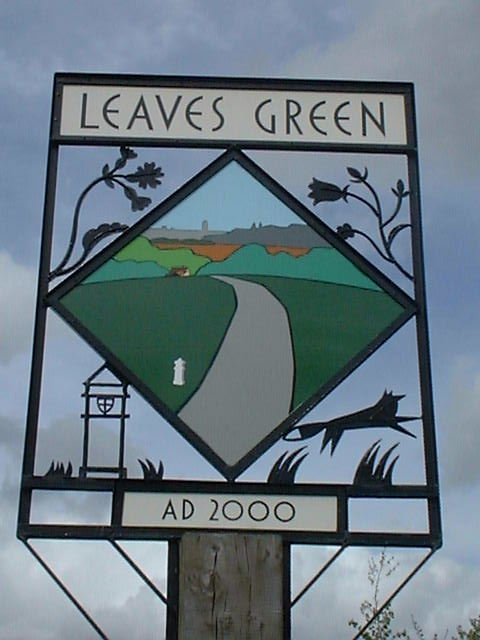
- The village sign incorporating the coal tax post

- Location within Greater London
- OS grid reference: TQ414616
- London borough: Bromley
- Ceremonial county: Greater London
- Region: London
- Country: England
- Sovereign state: United Kingdom
- Post town: KESTON
- Postcode district: BR2
- Dialling code: 01959
- Police: Metropolitan
- Fire: London
- Ambulance: London
- London Assembly: Bexley and Bromley

Leaves Green is a village in Greater London within the London Borough of Bromley.

The village lies on the Bromley to Westerham road (A233), adjacent to the north-western perimeter of Biggin Hill Airport. It is some 5 miles (8.0 km) south of Bromley and 2 miles (3.2 km) north of Biggin Hill.

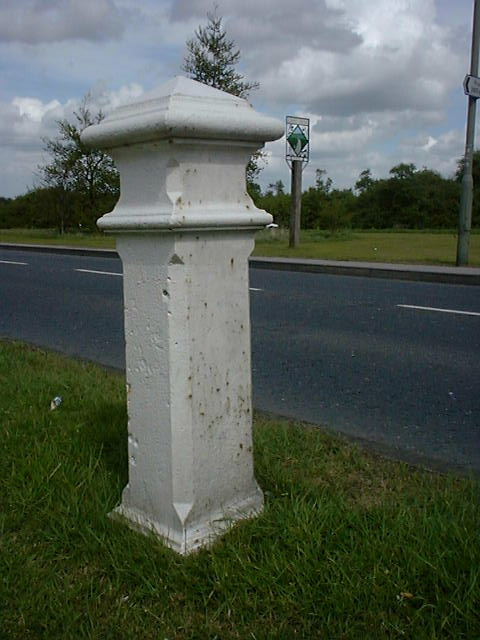
Coal tax post on the village green. The sign can be seen in the background.

Leaves Green village has a large (and eponymous) village green which straddles the A233. This is the location for one of London's coal tax posts (number 186) which formerly denoted the boundary of the area in which the City of London Corporation was empowered to collect duty on coal. The post is also depicted on the village sign.

== Local politics ==
Leaves Green is in the Orpington constituency, the safest Conservative Parliamentary seat in London.

It is also part of the largest ward in Greater London, the Darwin (ward), which covers a rural area including Downe, Cudham, Leaves Green, Single Street, Berry's Green, and Westerham Hill.

One councillor is elected every four years to Bromley London Borough Council. To date, the Darwin (ward), which is Greater London's largest Ward, has only been represented by the Conservative Party.
