= Single Street =

Coordinates: 51.320367°N 0.059459°E

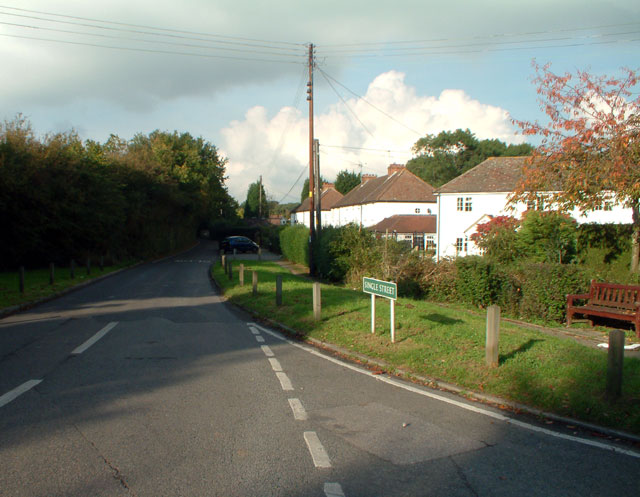
- Single Street, looking north from junction with Berry's Hill (to the right) and Jail Lane (to the left)

- Location within Greater London
- London borough: Bromley
- Ceremonial county: Greater London
- Region: London
- Country: England
- Sovereign state: United Kingdom
- Post town: WESTERHAM
- Postcode district: TN16
- Dialling code: 01959
- Police: Metropolitan
- Fire: London
- Ambulance: London
- London Assembly: Bexley and Bromley

Single Street is a hamlet in the London Borough of Bromley in Greater London, located between Luxted and Berry's Green, and centred around a street of the same name. The first record of a settlement under the name 'Single Street' is from an Ordnance Survey map in 1871, but its name is derived from sengel, an Old English word meaning 'burnt clearing'. Situated around 1 mile from both the Kent and Surrey borders, it is part of the largest ward in Greater London, Darwin (ward), covering a rural area including Downe, Cudham, Leaves Green, Berry's Green, and Westerham Hill.

== History ==
Lord Simon de Manning, a former Lord of the Manor for Kevington, London, (which included Single Street, Downe, Cudham, Luxted, and Berry's Green), and grandson to Rudolf de Manning, (Count Palatine), (who married Elgida, aunt to King Harold Harefoot of England), was the royal Standard Bearer to King Richard the Lionheart. He carried the Royal Standard to Jerusalem, in 1190, during the First Crusade. In England, the forms Earl Palatine, and Palatine Earldom, are preferred.

== Notable residents ==
- Nigel Farage MP for Clacton, leader of Reform UK, former MEP and former chairman of EFDD in the European Parliament.
