= Berry's Green =

Coordinates: 51.3136°N 0.0621°E

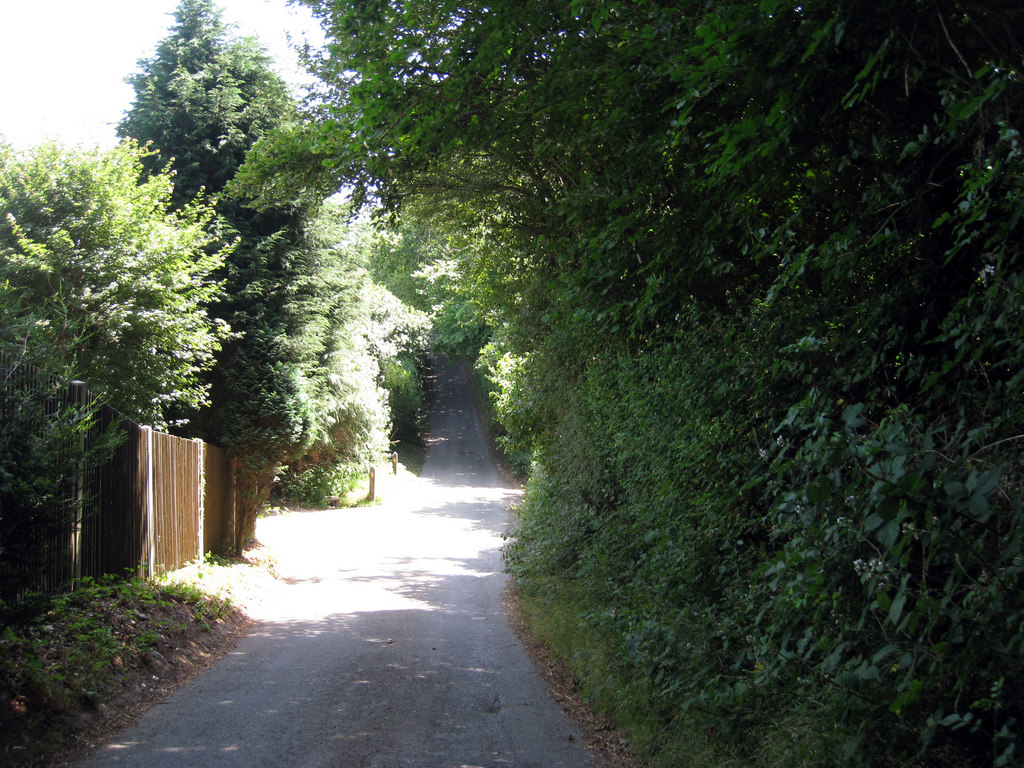
- Berry's Green Road

- Location within Greater London
- London borough: Bromley
- Ceremonial county: Greater London
- Region: London
- Country: England
- Sovereign state: United Kingdom
- Post town: WESTERHAM
- Postcode district: TN16
- Dialling code: 01959
- Police: Metropolitan
- Fire: London
- Ambulance: London
- UK Parliament: Orpington
- London Assembly: Bexley and Bromley

Berry's Green is a small hamlet in the London Borough of Bromley in Greater London, England, situated outside of London's contiguous built-up area. It is a fairly wooded rural area with a scattering of farmland. Housing consists mainly of detached properties, mostly bungalows, with a row of local authority cottages and a static mobile home site. It is part of the largest ward in Greater London, Darwin (ward). When the Ward was first constituted in 1965, Berry's Green, was joined with Downe, Cudham, Leaves Green, Single Street, Luxted, and Westerham Hill. The current elected political party's website (2022), states the present named other areas as Downe, Cudham, Leaves Green, Leavesden Estate, Westerham Hill, Beechwood, and Pratts Bottom

== Partial History ==
Lord Simon de Manning, a former Lord of the Manor for Kevington, London and holder of the land which became Berry's Green, was a Grandson of Rudolph de Manning, Count Palatine, (who married Elgida, aunt to King Harold I of England), (Harold Harefoot); he was the royal Standard Bearer to King Richard the Lionheart, and carried the royal Standard to Jerusalem in 1190, during the Third Crusade. In England, the forms Earl Palatine and Palatine Earldom are preferred.

On early maps, the area and Berry's Green Farm are each spelt as "Bury's Green".

On the junction of Jail Lane and Berry's Hill is a small wood, with a large World War II bomb crater. This may have been caused by a V-2 rocket as it is almost the same distance from Germany as the last known V-2, which was dropped in Kynaston Rd, Orpington. Many of the V-2s fell short of London towards the end of the war. There are also a number of smaller bomb craters scattered around the surrounding woodlands, due to its proximity to Biggin Hill airfield.

Berry's Green is home to The Old Jail, Biggin Hill, and Cherry Lodge Golf Course, which opened in 1968. The land there is approximately 600 ft. above sea level.

In the late 1960s and early 1970s, there was a sub-post office on the corner of Single Street and Jail Lane which sold provisions, such as bread, milk, sweets, and crisps. Mains sewerage was installed around 1973.

Biggin Hill, nearby Cudham and Berry's Green are the only places in Greater London to be part of the Tunbridge Wells postcode area (TN16).

== Transport ==
=== Buses ===
- R8 to Biggin Hill or Orpington. Operated by Go Ahead London for London Buses

=== Rail ===
The nearest National Rail station is Chelsfield located 4.5 miles away. Orpington railway station is approximately 5.1 miles away.
