= Kevington, London =

Coordinates: 51.387°N 0.131°E

Kevington
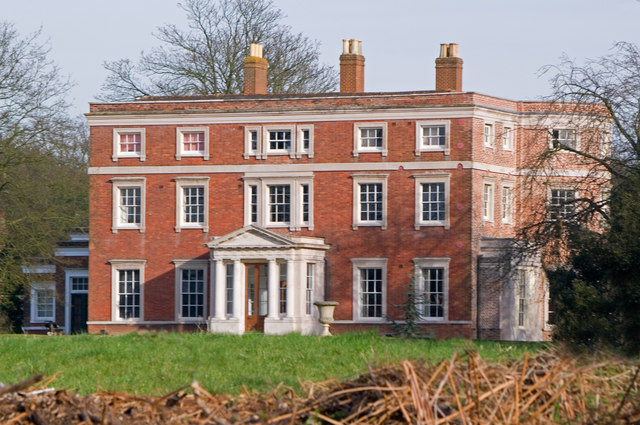
- Kevington Hall

- Location within Greater London
- OS grid reference: TQ484675
- London borough: Bromley
- Ceremonial county: Greater London
- Region: London
- Country: England
- Sovereign state: United Kingdom
- Post town: ORPINGTON
- Postcode district: BR5
- Police: Metropolitan
- Fire: London
- Ambulance: London
- London Assembly: Bexley and Bromley

Kevington, sometimes spelt Kevingtown, is a rural hamlet in South East London, England, within the London Borough of Bromley. It lies north east of Orpington and south west of Swanley and is adjacent to the Greater London border with Kent, in the Metropolitan green belt.

== History ==
Kevington was in the historic county of Kent until 1965, when Greater London was formed.

The name is thought to refer either to a 'place on a hillock', or a Saxon-era landowner named Cyfa. Some old maps show two distinct places here – Kevington and Kevingtown – but this distinction has since been lost.

Lord Simon de Manning was Lord of the Manor of Kevington, London (which included Single Street, Luxted, Cudham, Downe, and Berry's Green), and grandson to Rudolf de Manning (who married Elgida, aunt to King Harold 1, Harold Harefoot), of England); he was the standard-bearer to King Richard the Lionheart. He carried the royal standard to Jerusalem in 1190, during the First Crusade.

In the Middle Ages the area formed part of Kevington manor and was in the hands of the Manning and Onslow families. In the mid 1700s the Onslows sold part of their lands to the Dutch financial merchant Herman Behrens, who employed Sir Robert Taylor to build Kevington Hall in 1769. The Hall was used to billet Canadian troops during the Second World War and was later used as a primary school; it now functions as a conference and events space. Oak View School (originally Shawcroft Special School) opened nearby in 1976 to cater for young people with special needs. There was once a pub in the hamlet called the Kevington Arms, but this is now a farm building.

The nearest railway stations are St Mary Cray and Swanley.
