= Hazelwood, London =

Coordinates: 51.335°N 0.075°E

Hazelwood
- Location within Greater London
- London borough: Bromley
- Ceremonial county: Greater London
- Region: London
- Country: England
- Sovereign state: United Kingdom
- Post town: SEVENOAKS
- Postcode district: TN14
- Dialling code: 01689
- Police: Metropolitan
- Fire: London
- Ambulance: London
- UK Parliament: Orpington
- London Assembly: Bexley and Bromley

Hazelwood is a hamlet in Greater London, England. It is located within the London Borough of Bromley, to the east of Downe.
