= TN postcode area =

Postcode area within the United Kingdom

Tunbridge Wells
- Postcode area
- Coordinates: 51.085°N 0.439°E
- Country: United Kingdom
- Postcode area: TN
- Postcode area name: Tunbridge Wells
- Post towns: 24
- Postcode districts: 40
- Postcode sectors: 128
- Postcodes (live): 22,620
- Postcodes (total): 32,534
- Statistics as at May 2020

The TN postcode area, also known as the Tunbridge Wells postcode area, is a group of 40 postcode districts in England, within 24 post towns. These cover south and west Kent (including Royal Tunbridge Wells, Tonbridge, Ashford, Sevenoaks, Westerham, Cranbrook, Edenbridge, New Romney, Romney Marsh and Tenterden) and northern and eastern East Sussex (including Hastings, Battle, Bexhill-on-Sea, Crowborough, Etchingham, Hartfield, Heathfield, Mayfield, Robertsbridge, Rye, St Leonards-on-Sea, Uckfield, Wadhurst and Winchelsea), plus very small parts of Surrey and the London Borough of Bromley.

Mail for this area is sorted at the Royal Mail Sorting Office in Rochester, which also sorts all mail from the adjoining ME postcode area.

== Coverage ==
The approximate coverage of the postcode districts:

Postcode district	Post town	Coverage	Local authority area(s)
TN1	TUNBRIDGE WELLS	Royal Tunbridge Wells (town centre)	Tunbridge Wells
TN2	TUNBRIDGE WELLS	Royal Tunbridge Wells (south and east), Pembury	Tunbridge Wells
TN2	WADHURST		non-geographic
TN3	TUNBRIDGE WELLS	Langton Green, Groombridge, Frant, Speldhurst, Lamberhurst	Tunbridge Wells, Wealden
TN4	TUNBRIDGE WELLS	Royal Tunbridge Wells (north), Rusthall, Southborough	Tunbridge Wells
TN5	WADHURST	Wadhurst, Ticehurst, Tidebrook, Stonegate	Rother, Wealden
TN6	CROWBOROUGH	Black Hill, Boarshead, Friar's Gate, Jarvis Brook, Mark Cross, Rotherfield, Town Row	Wealden
TN7	HARTFIELD	Coleman's Hatch, Hartfield	Wealden
TN8	EDENBRIDGE	Crockham Hill, Edenbridge	Sevenoaks, Tandridge
TN9	TONBRIDGE	Tonbridge (town centre and south)	Tonbridge and Malling
TN10	TONBRIDGE	Tonbridge (north including Higham Wood)	Tonbridge and Malling
TN11	TONBRIDGE	Penshurst, Hildenborough, Hadlow, Tudeley	Sevenoaks, Tonbridge and Malling, Tunbridge Wells
TN12	TONBRIDGE	Paddock Wood, Staplehurst, Brenchley, Horsmonden, Marden, East Peckham	Maidstone, Tonbridge and Malling, Tunbridge Wells
TN13	SEVENOAKS	Sevenoaks, Riverhead, Dunton Green	Sevenoaks
TN14	SEVENOAKS	Cudham, Knockholt, Shoreham, Otford, Hazelwood	Bromley, Sevenoaks
TN15	SEVENOAKS	Kemsing, Ightham, Plaxtol, Wrotham, Sevenoaks Weald, Borough Green	Sevenoaks, Tonbridge and Malling
TN16	WESTERHAM	Westerham, Biggin Hill, Berry's Green, Tatsfield	Bromley, Sevenoaks, Tandridge
TN17	CRANBROOK	Cranbrook, Goudhurst, Sissinghurst, Benenden, Frittenden	Ashford, Tunbridge Wells
TN18	CRANBROOK	Hawkhurst, Sandhurst	Tunbridge Wells
TN19	ETCHINGHAM	Etchingham, Burwash	Rother
TN20	MAYFIELD	Five Ashes	Wealden
TN21	HEATHFIELD	Heathfield, Broad Oak, Horam, Cross in Hand	Rother, Wealden
TN22	UCKFIELD	Buxted, Isfield, Maresfield, Nutley, Uckfield	Wealden
TN23	ASHFORD	Ashford (town centre), Kingsnorth, Singleton	Ashford
TN24	ASHFORD	Willesborough, Kennington, Boughton Aluph, Goat Lees	Ashford
TN25	ASHFORD	Challock, Wye, Stowting, Brook	Ashford, Folkestone and Hythe
TN26	ASHFORD	Bethersden, Hamstreet, Shadoxhurst, Woodchurch	Ashford
TN27	ASHFORD	Headcorn, Biddenden	Ashford, Maidstone
TN28	NEW ROMNEY	New Romney, Greatstone-on-Sea, Littlestone-on-Sea	Folkestone and Hythe
TN29	ROMNEY MARSH	Lydd, Dymchurch, Dungeness	Folkestone and Hythe
TN30	TENTERDEN	Tenterden, Wittersham	Ashford
TN31	RYE	Rye, Camber, Northiam	Rother
TN32	ROBERTSBRIDGE	Robertsbridge, Mountfield, Bodiam, Brightling	Rother
TN33	BATTLE	Battle	Rother, Wealden
TN34	HASTINGS	Hastings town centre	Hastings
TN35	HASTINGS	Hastings, Pett, Guestling, Westfield	Hastings, Rother
TN36	WINCHELSEA	Winchelsea, Icklesham	Rother
TN37	ST. LEONARDS-ON-SEA	St Leonards-on-Sea	Hastings
TN38	ST. LEONARDS-ON-SEA	St Leonards-on-Sea, Silverhill, Wishing Tree, North Hastings, Bulverhythe	Hastings
TN39	BEXHILL-ON-SEA	Bexhill-on-Sea, Cooden	Rother
TN40	BEXHILL-ON-SEA	Bexhill-on-Sea, Pebsham	Rother

== Delivery offices ==
Main delivery offices are in Ashford, Bexhill, Biggin Hill, Cranbrook, Crowborough, Edenbridge, Heathfield, New Romney, Rye, Sevenoaks, St Leonards, Tenterden, Tonbridge, Tunbridge Wells and Uckfield. Scale Payment Delivery Offices are in Post Offices of Appledore, Bethersden, Brabourne Lees, Charing, Egerton, Etchingham, Headcorn, Marden, Robertsbridge, Smarden, Staplehurst and Woodchurch.

== Map ==
TN postcode area map, showing postcode districts in red and post towns in grey text, with links to nearby BN, BR, CR, CT, DA, ME, RH and SE postcode areas.

== See also ==
- Postcode Address File
- List of postcode areas in the United Kingdom
