= Downe =

Village in Greater London, England

Coordinates: 51.3359°N 0.0535°E

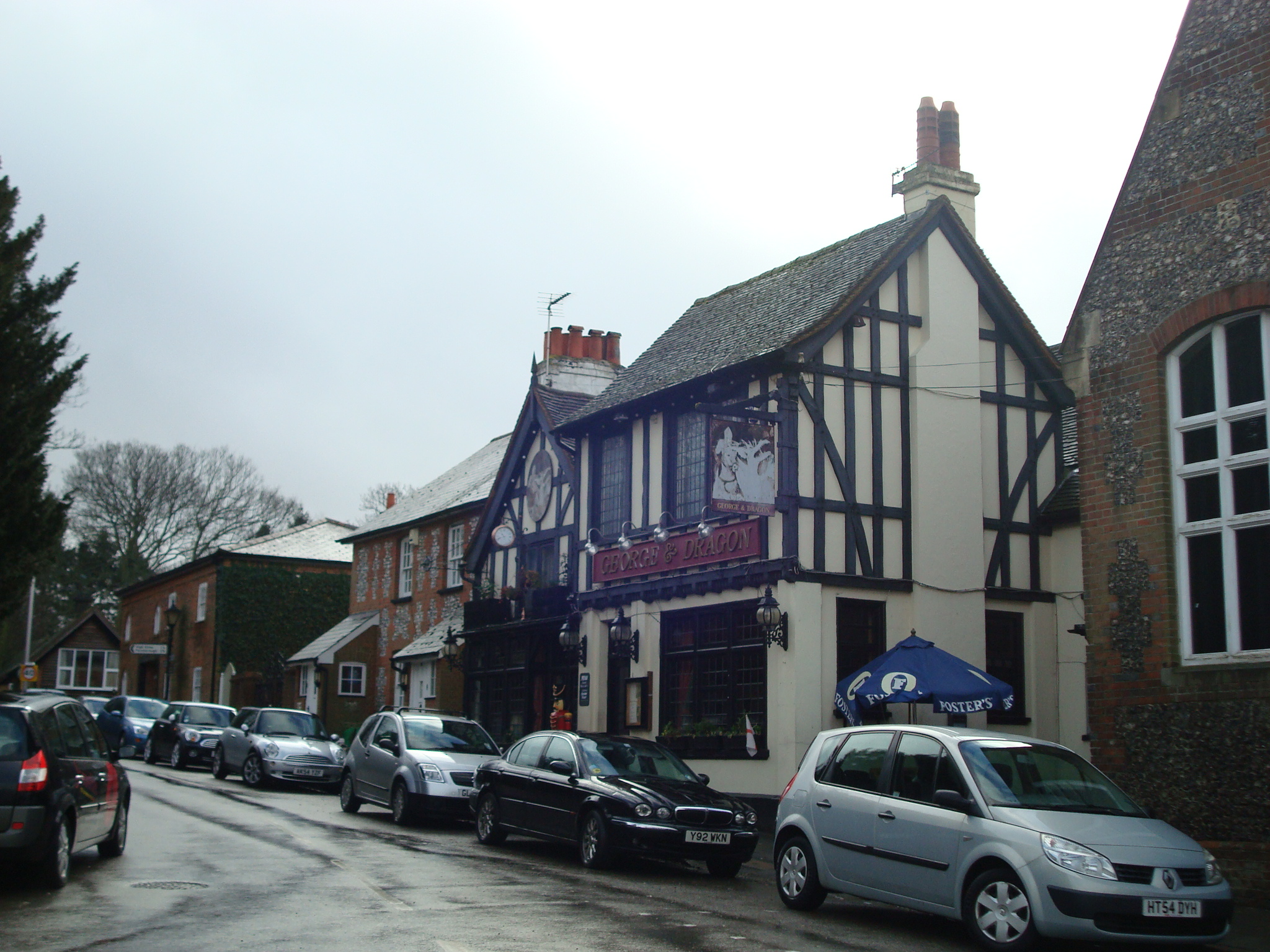
- George and Dragon public house, Downe

- Location within Greater London
- OS grid reference: TQ435615
- London borough: Bromley
- Ceremonial county: Greater London
- Region: London
- Country: England
- Sovereign state: United Kingdom
- Post town: ORPINGTON
- Postcode district: BR6
- Dialling code: 01689
- Police: Metropolitan
- Fire: London
- Ambulance: London
- UK Parliament: Orpington
- London Assembly: Bexley and Bromley

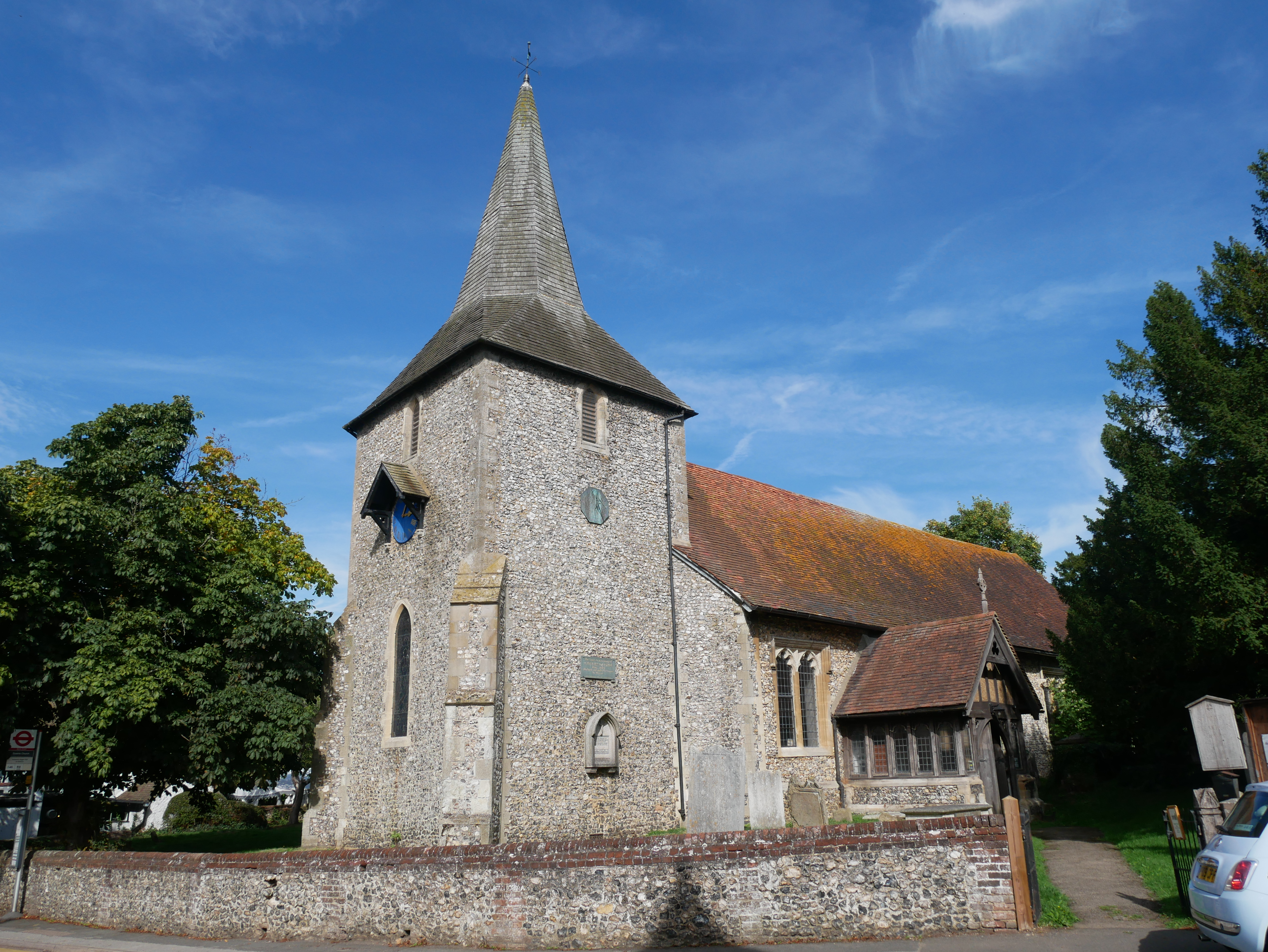
The medieval Church of Saint Mary in Downe

Downe, formerly Down (/daʊn/), is a village in Greater London, England, located within the London Borough of Bromley, which formed part of the historical county of Kent until 1965, and is beyond London's urban sprawl. The naturalist Charles Darwin lived in Down House for forty years until his death in 1882.

Downe is 3.4 miles (5.5 km) south west of Orpington and 14.2 miles (22.9 km) south east of Charing Cross in London. Downe lies on a low ridge (an outlier of the North Downs), and much of the centre of the village retains its historic buildings; the former village school now acts as the village hall.

The word Downe originates from the Anglo Saxon word dūn, latterly down, hence the South and North Downs.

In April 1965, much of Orpington Urban District, including Downe, was transferred from the historic county of Kent and placed within the newly created London Borough of Bromley.

== Brief history ==
Lord Simon de Manning, a former Lord of the Manor of nearby Kevington, then in Kent, and holder of the land which now includes Downe, was a grandson of Rudolph de Manning, Count Palatine, who married Elgida, aunt of King Harold I, of England; he was the royal Standard Bearer to King Richard the Lionheart, who carried the Royal Standard to Jerusalem in 1190, during the First Crusade. In England, the forms Earl Palatine and Palatine Earldom are preferred.

As well as Downe, Kevington Manor then included the areas which later became Berry's Green, Luxted, Single Street, Westerham Hill, and Leaves Green. These (excluding Kevington), together formed the Darwin (ward), Greater London's largest electoral ward), as it was first constituted in 1965. The current elected political party's website (2022), states that the ward includes Cudham, Leaves Green, Leavesden Estate, Westerham Hill, Beechwood, Berry's Green, and Pratts Bottom.

The spelling of the name of the village varied in the past, until the 1870s it was most commonly "Down", then "Downe’ became more usual. In postal directories of the mid-19th century, it is named as Down. By 1882 Kelly's Directory was using "Downe".

On 1 April 1934 the parish was abolished and merged with Orpington. At the 1931 census (the last before the abolition of the parish), Downe had a population of 717.

== Darwin ==
Charles Darwin lived in Down House for 40 years, from 1842 until he died there in 1882. Sir John Lubbock, 3rd Baronet, lived nearby at his High Elms estate on the other side of the village, and Darwin soon became a close friend and colleague of Lubbock's son, who from 1865 was the 4th Baronet, and from 1901 1st Baron Avebury. A favourite place of Darwin's was Downe Bank, now a nature reserve and Site of Special Scientific Interest together with High Elms Country Park, and several members of Darwin's family are buried in the graveyard of St Mary's Church.

Down House and the surrounding area has been nominated by the Department of Culture, Media and Sport to become a World Heritage Site. However, this decision has been deferred.

== Local politics ==
Since 2019, the local Member of Parliament has been Gareth Bacon of the Conservative Party. In the 2017 General Election, with a majority of 19,453 votes (38.5%), Orpington was the safest Conservative Parliamentary seat in London.

One councillor is elected every four years to Bromley London Borough Council. To date, the Darwin ward has only been represented by representatives from the Conservative Party. It is the largest Greater London ward, and includes Berry's Green, Single Street, Luxted, Leaves Green, Westerham Hill, and Cudham.

Darwin ward 2018
Party	Candidate	Votes	%	±%
Conservative	Richard Scoates	1,201	72.8	
Labour	Frank Evans	185	11.2	
Liberal Democrats	Millicent Scott Brooks	133	8.1	
Green	Jan Wilson	130	7.9	
Turnout		1,649	40.0	
Conservative hold		Swing		

Darwin ward 2014 (1)
Party	Candidate	Votes	%	±%
Conservative	Richard Scoates	987	51.2	
UKIP	Eric Hayward	681	35.3	
Labour	John Evans	105	5.4	
Green	Eileen Galloway	89	4.6	
Liberal Democrats	William Ritchie	45	2.3	
Majority		306		
Turnout		1,927		
Conservative hold		Swing		

== Buckston Browne Farm ==
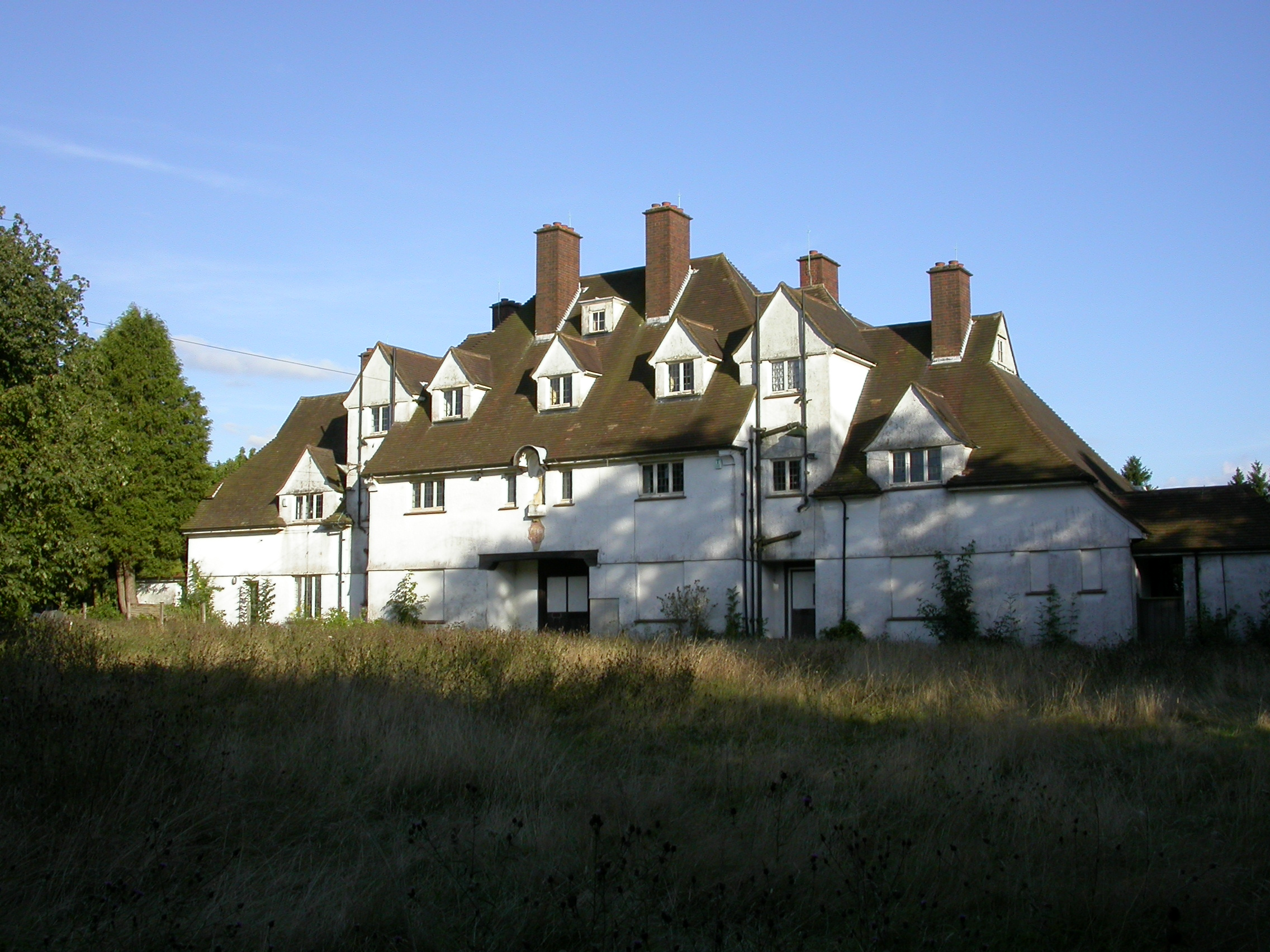
Buckston Browne Farm

Downe is the location of Buckston Browne Farm, built in 1931 as a surgical research centre by the Royal College of Surgeons (RCS). In the 1980s, the farm caused controversy because of its use of vivisection techniques, and in August 1984 it was raided by anti-vivisection activists.

The farm has now been made into four houses.

== Scouting ==
There are two scout campsites in the Downe area:

- The Downe Scout Activity Centre consisting of 86 acres (350,000 m^{2}) of woodland and open fields is just outside the village.
- The Greenwich (one of the Districts of the Greater London South Scout county) District campsite is also nearby.

== Transport ==
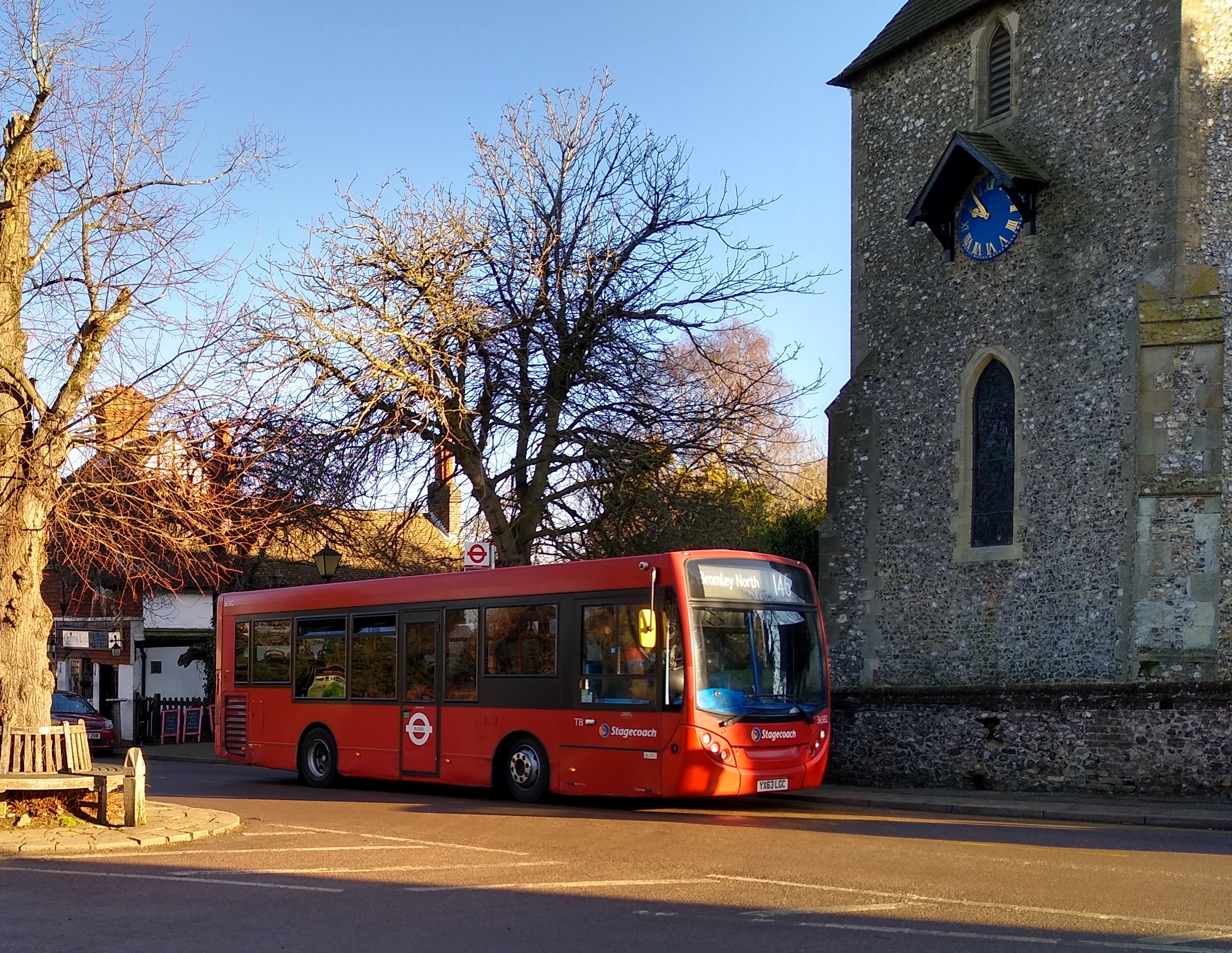
Bus route 146 outside St Mary's Church

The closest National Rail stations to Downe are at Orpington and Hayes, located 4.5 and 4.7 miles away respectively.

The village is served by London Buses routes 146 and R8 which provide connections to Bromley, Orpington and Biggin Hill.

== Notable people ==
- Bill Hunter Christie (1922–97), lobbyist for the Falkland Islanders
- Charles Darwin (1809–82), biologist, naturalist and geologist
- Horace Darwin (1851–1928), civil engineer and Fellow of Trinity College, Cambridge
- Nigel Farage (born 1964), former leader of UKIP and Member of European Parliament for South East England.
- Charles Hayes (1678–1760), mathematician and chronologist
- John Lubbock (1803–65), banker, barrister, mathematician and astronomer
- John Lubbock (1834–1913), banker, biologist, archaeologist and Liberal politician
- Mark Lubbock (1898–1986), conductor and composer of operetta and light music
- Herbert Newton Casson (1869–1951), journalist and author, founder of Efficiency magazine
- Olive Willis (1877–1964), founder of Downe House School

== Nearest places ==
- Cudham
- Berry's Green
- Luxted
- Single Street
- Farnborough
- Keston
- Orpington
