= Biggin Hill =

Town in Greater London, England

Coordinates: 51.3127°N 0.0336°E

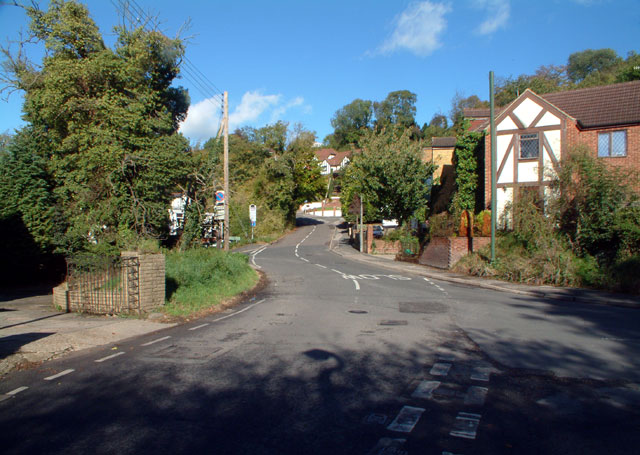
- Polesteeple Hill, Biggin Hill

- Location within Greater London
- Population: 10,817
- OS grid reference: TQ418590
  - Charing Cross: 15.2 mi (24.5 km) NNW
- London borough: Bromley
- Ceremonial county: Greater London
- Region: London
- Country: England
- Sovereign state: United Kingdom
- Post town: WESTERHAM
- Postcode district: TN16
- Dialling code: 01959
- Police: Metropolitan
- Fire: London
- Ambulance: London
- UK Parliament: Orpington
- London Assembly: Bexley and Bromley

Biggin Hill is a town in the London Borough of Bromley, about 15.2 miles (24.5 km) south-southeast of Charing Cross. It is separated from London's built-up area by the Metropolitan green belt and is located adjacent to the Greater London boundary with Kent and Surrey. Prior to the creation of Greater London in 1965, it was part of Kent. At the 2011 Census, Biggin Hill had a population of 9,951.

Biggin Hill is one of the highest points of Greater London, rising to over 210 metres (690 ft) above sea level. Biggin Hill Airport occupies land formerly used by RAF Biggin Hill, one of the principal fighter bases protecting London from German bombers during the Battle of Britain and The Blitz.

== History ==
=== Toponymy ===
Historically, the settlement was known as Aperfield.

=== Local government ===
Biggin Hill formed part of Cudham, an ancient parish in the county of Kent. Following the Local Government Act 1894 it formed part of Bromley Rural District. The parish became part of Orpington Urban District in 1934. Kent County Council formed the second tier of local government from 1889. In 1965, the London County Council was abolished and replaced by the Greater London Council, with an expanded administrative area, so that Biggin Hill is now part of the London Borough of Bromley.

Biggin Hill is part of the Biggin Hill ward for elections to Bromley London Borough Council.

== Buildings ==
The most architecturally noteworthy building within Biggin Hill is St Mark's Church, Church Road – 'the moving church' - designed by Richard Gilbert Scott. It was erected in the 1950s using the dismantled materials from All Saints Church, North Peckham. Much of the work was undertaken by volunteers led by Rev Vivian Symons who undertook much of the decorative work himself.

== Airport ==
Biggin Hill has an airport—more than an airfield as it has a terminal building and customs facilities—London Biggin Hill Airport, which uses much of the land formerly used by RAF Biggin Hill, an aerodrome best known for its role during the Battle of Britain. The airfield was the location of the "Operations Room" for the Operation Crossbow V-1 flying bomb defence during World War II.

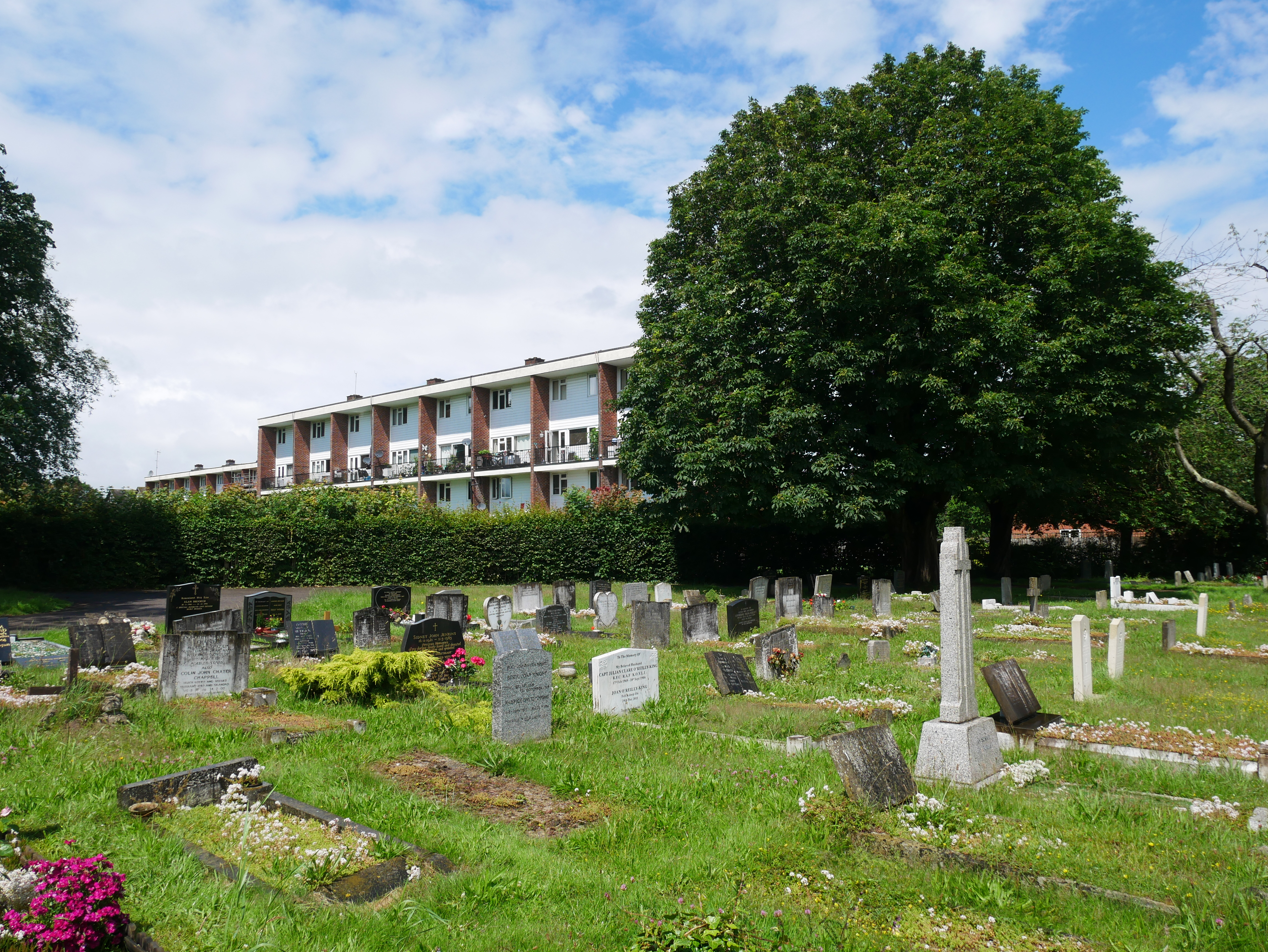
The Biggin Hill Cemetery

The old "west camp" of the airport is now owned by Bernie Ecclestone. Most of the buildings in the West Camp are Grade II listed. A small section remains in the care of the RAF, and the Grade II listed chapel (guarded by replicas of the station gate guardians, a Hawker Hurricane and a Supermarine Spitfire) is open to the public.

Many ghosts are commonly attributed to the World War II airbase.

The old "south camp" is now occupied by the Biggin Hill Business Park, Airport Industrial Estate and various private flying clubs. There are further commercial premises, hangars, private flying clubs and a helicopter joy-ride and pilot training centre to the east of the main runway.

The airport is host to a wide range of private and business jet and turbo-prop aircraft up to the size of a Boeing 737. In the 21st century it was enlarged and improved, and as of 2020 further expansion was planned.

A model aircraft site operates within its Air Traffic Zone, operating large model aircraft. In 2009 there were sightings of model aircraft traffic and one air proximity report was filed, according to the Airport Consultative Committee in May 2010.

Biggin Hill is the location of a VOR-DME navigational beacon, codenamed "BIG", which anchors the South East Arrival Stack for London Heathrow Airport.

The airport was the venue of the Biggin Hill International Air Fair, an annual airshow that usually took place towards the end of June. The event was first held in 1963 and the airshow was permanently cancelled in 2010, shortly after the 48th event.

The airport featured in the 2006 film "The Da Vinci Code" starring Tom Hanks.

== Education ==
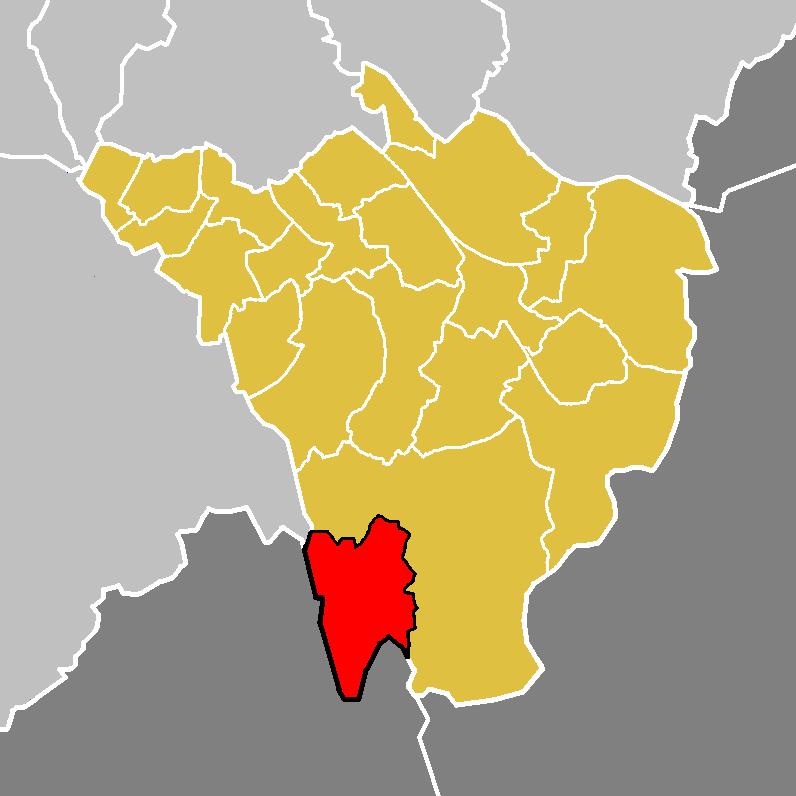
Ward of Biggin Hill (red) shown within the London Borough of Bromley (orange)

Charles Darwin School is a secondary school within three miles of the centre.

Two main primary schools operate: Oaklands Primary School and Biggin Hill Primary School. Beyond the outskirts are Cudham CoE Primary School near Foal Farm, Tatsfield Primary in Tatsfield to the west and Downe Primary in Downe village.

== Demographics ==
The area is represented by the Biggin Hill ward, which according to the 2011 UK census had a population of 9,951 and a density of 12 people per hectare. The census showed that 93% of the population was White British. The median age of the population was 42. The most common accommodation type was detached houses or bungalows.

== Location ==
Biggin Hill is on the outskirts of the London Borough of Bromley. The A233 road is the only main road that runs through the area, from North to South. Most of the settlements that surround Biggin Hill are small towns and villages. Biggin Hill's postcode is TN16, and its post town is Westerham (although Westerham itself is located outside Greater London).

== Transport ==
Biggin Hill is part of the Transport for London operating area and is thus served by several London Buses services as well as one route operated by Metrobus. Buses provide connections to Bromley, Keston, Hayes, Westerham, Downham, Catford, Oxted, Locksbottom, New Addington, Tatsfield, Orpington and Green Street Green.

The nearest National Rail station to Biggin Hill is Hayes station (located 5 miles away) as well as Oxted station in Surrey plus Bromley South station and Orpington station. The nearest Tramlink stop is New Addington located 4 miles away.

== See also ==
- 2008 Biggin Hill Cessna Citation crash
