= Cudham =

Area in London, England

Coordinates: 51.3193°N 0.07106°E

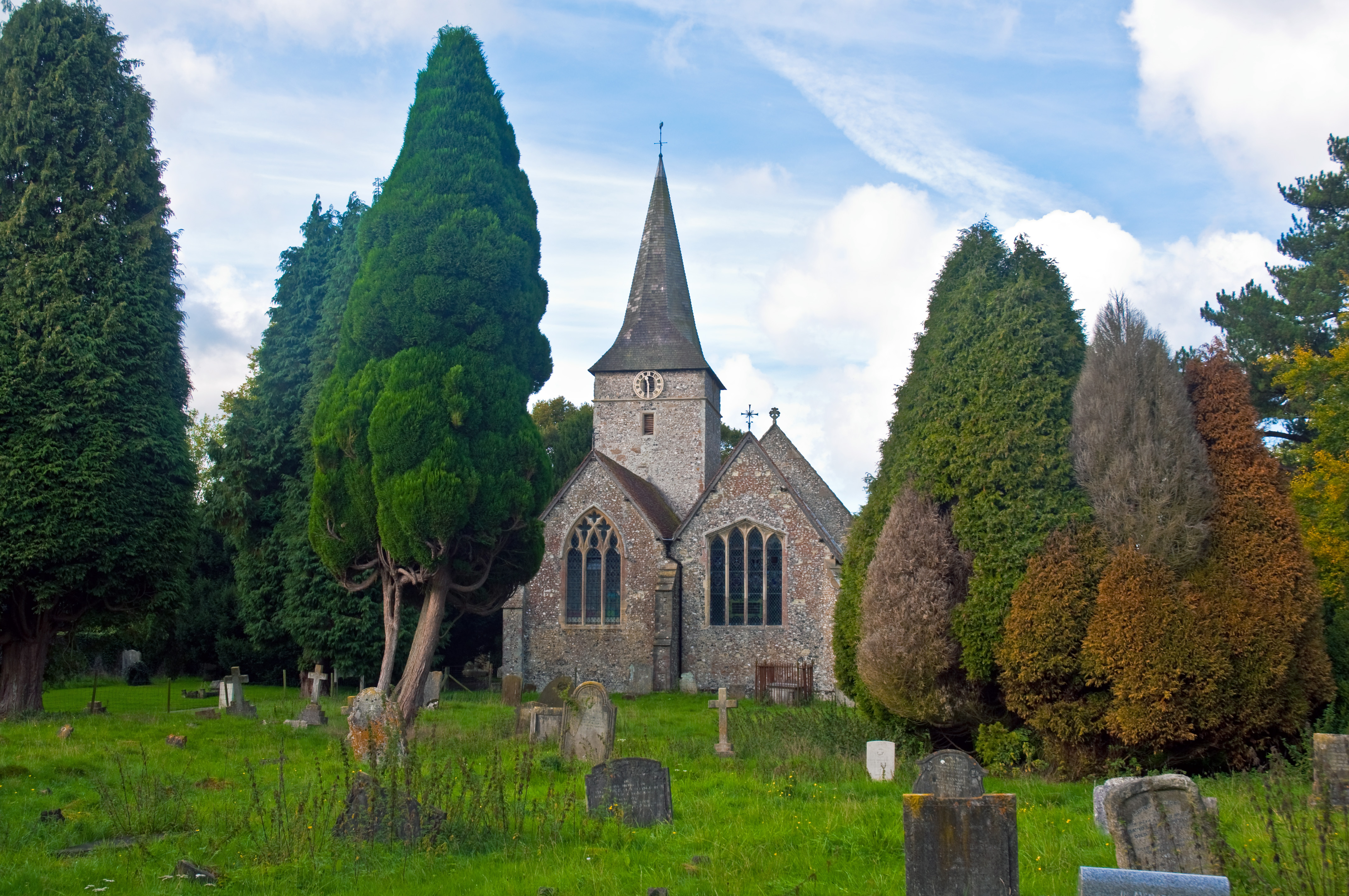
- Cudham Church

- Location within Greater London
- OS grid reference: TQ445595
  - Charing Cross: 15.5 mi (24.9 km) NNW
- London borough: Bromley
- Ceremonial county: Greater London
- Region: London
- Country: England
- Sovereign state: United Kingdom
- Post town: SEVENOAKS
- Postcode district: TN14
- Dialling code: 01959
- Police: Metropolitan
- Fire: London
- Ambulance: London
- UK Parliament: Orpington
- London Assembly: Bexley and Bromley

Cudham is a village in the London Borough of Bromley, Greater London, England. It has part of London's long border with Kent. (Note: Specifically bordering part of Knockholt in Sevenoaks District) Cudham is south of Orpington and north west of Sevenoaks, major towns. It is 15.6 miles (25.1 km) south-southeast of Charing Cross and sits on high land near a crest of the North Downs, which reach their maximum for Kent, which was its traditional county, 1 mile (1.6 km) to the south-west, on what remains in traditional parish (Note: Ecclesiastical parish) a western limit of Cudham, at Betsom's Hill. Part of that subtle peak part has Greater London's high point excluding the top of its highest building. (Note: The Shard stands 309.6 metres (1,016 feet) high; Westerham Heights stands at 245 metres above ordnance datum) The village hosts two main annual events and it has a cricket club and many footpaths and cycleways. In the roads network is connected through a series of other areas to the M25 motorway which is on a slope beyond the hillcrest about 3 kilometres (1.9 mi) to the south.

== History ==
Cudham church, dedicated to St Peter and St Paul, is mentioned in the Domesday Book.

Much later, Lord Simon de Manning, a former Lord of the Manor for Kevington, and holder of this land excluding its church lands, was a grandson of Rudolph de Manning, Count (Earl) Palatine, (who, married Elgida, aunt to King Harold I, (Harold Harefoot), of England); he was the royal Standard Bearer to King Richard the Lionheart, who carried that to Jerusalem in 1190, during the First Crusade.

The Blacksmith's Arms, originally a 17th-century farmhouse, has memorabilia relating to the music hall artiste "Little Tich".

The civil parish incepted in the late 19th century in the change to mainstay secularisation of local government was subordinate to Bromley Rural District from 1894, on 1 April 1934 the parish was abolished and at that date its land was added to Orpington Urban District. At the 1931 census (the last before the abolition of the parish), Cudham had a population of 3,731 residents. The village was therefore part of Kent (and administered by Kent County Council) until the creation of Greater London on 1 April 1965. Cudham Recreation Ground is home to Cudham Wyse Cricket Club, formed in 1965.

== Landscape and daughter villages ==
The rolling hills of Cudham are on a general northward downslope dotted with woods, few ditches and streams in the form of winterbournes. Cudham traditionally had significant pasture including, being on the North Downs, of sheep bred to meet English and neighbouring countries' high demand for medieval English wool suitable to be made into quite expensive fabric such as broadcloth. Two usually rural districts of London commonly called villages were for centuries, until their founding, in Cudham (for details on Cudham Lodge which was demolished for a runway see Biggin Hill Aerodrome. These 'villages' are:

- Biggin Hill
- South Street

Late Victorian maps show most of the border with modern Kent (at that time other Kent parishes to the south) sits on a ridge varying between 710 and 778 feet above sea level. As normal in the North Downs, this then falls away abruptly to the south, more so where there has been limestone and chalk quarrying. London's highest point is south of South Street: Westerham Heights.

== Transport ==
Cudham, being in the county of Greater London, is under the Transport for London remit and is served by a London Buses bus service, with the R5/R10 connecting the main street with Orpington via Green Street Green, and also to Knockholt in Kent. The closest rail links are Chelsfield station and Knockholt station, in London fare zone 6.

== Events ==
Cudham hosts

- A village show and fete, begun in the 19th century, held on August Bank Holiday Monday.
- Cudham Craic music festival, a two-day music event at Cudham recreation ground.

== Politics ==
=== Local politics ===
Cudham is part of the largest ward in Greater London, Darwin, covering a rural, North Downs, area including Downe, Leaves Green, Berry's Green, Single Street, and London's north side of Westerham Hill.

As a sparsely populated ward, one councillor is elected every four years to Bromley London Borough Council. To date, the Darwin ward has only been represented by representatives from the Conservative Party.

=== National politics ===
Orpington is the MP's seat (constituency) of which Cudham has been part for many decades. By size of majority it is widely considered a safe or very safe Conservative seat.
