= Bingham Road railway station =

Disused railway station in Addiscombe, Croydon, England

Bingham Road
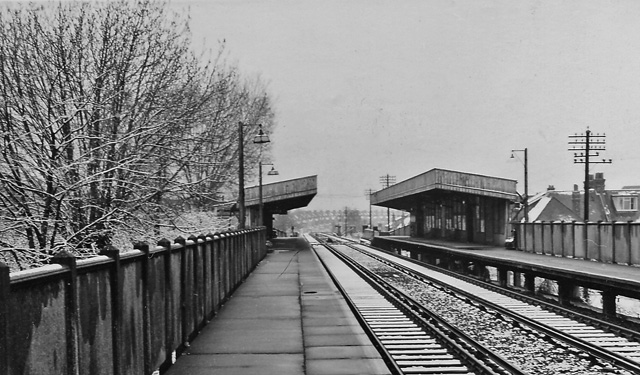
- Interactive map of Bingham Road

General information
- Location: Addiscombe
- Local authority: Croydon
- Grid reference: TQ342661
- Number of platforms: 2

Railway companies
- Original company: Woodside and South Croydon Joint Railway
- Pre-grouping: Woodside and South Croydon Joint Railway
- Post-grouping: Southern Railway; British Rail

Key dates
- 1 September 1906: Opened as Bingham Road Halt (northern side location)
- 15 March 1915: Closed
- 30 September 1935: New station opened as Bingham Road (southern side location)
- 16 May 1983: Closed

Other information
- Coordinates: 51.3790°N 0.0731°W

Bingham Road railway station was in Addiscombe, Croydon on the Woodside and South Croydon Joint Railway. It was opened on 1 September 1906 on the north side of Bingham Road, with two wooden platforms without buildings and was closed on 15 March 1915 as a wartime economy measure. A new station on the south side of Bingham Road was opened in 1935 and finally closed in 1983. The modern Addiscombe tram stop (open 2000) at ground level is situated at the location of the first halt closed in 1915 which was situated on an embankment above the present site.

== History ==
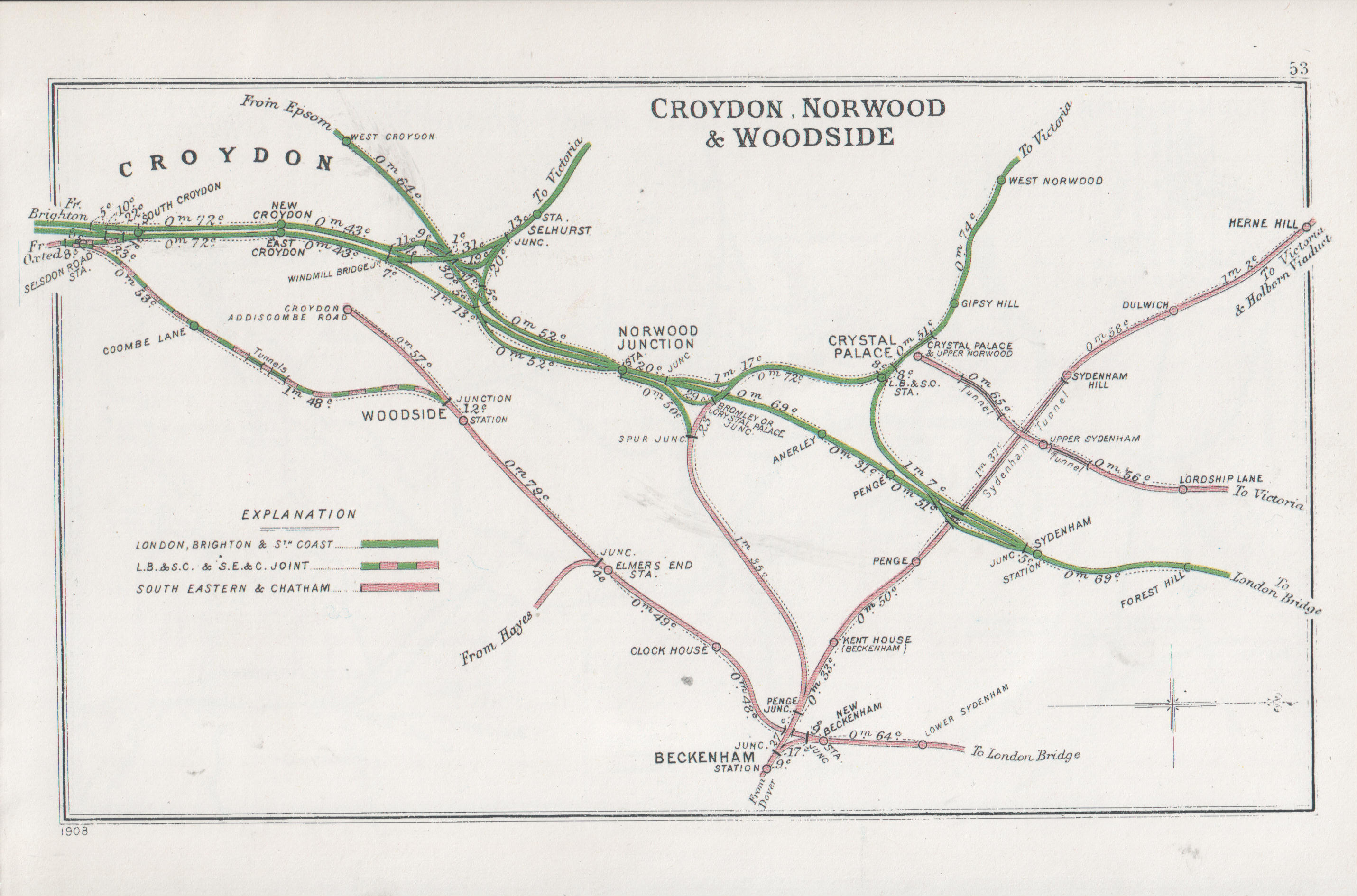
A 1908 Railway Clearing House map of part the Woodside and South Croydon Railway, showing the surrounding lines. The map has north on the right. Bingham Road Halt was just above the "W" of Woodside.

A 2-mile-29-chain (3.8 km) link between the Mid-Kent Line at Woodside and the Oxted Line at Selsdon Road known as the Woodside and South Croydon Joint Railway was authorised in 1880. Opened on 10 August 1885, it was jointly worked by the London, Brighton and South Coast Railway and the South Eastern Railway.

As part of a scheme to increase patronage using Kitson steam railmotors designed by Wainwright, a railway halt was provided on the north side of Bingham Road in Addiscombe on 1 September 1906. Spencer Road Halt, also on the Woodside and South Croydon line, was opened on the same day, part of four such halts in the London area; the others being Bandon Halt and Beeches Halt. The site chosen for Bingham Road station was adjacent to the Addiscombe terminus of the Croydon Corporation Tramways' service. Facilities consisted of two 100-foot (30 m) wooden platforms, with the tickets for passengers joining or leaving the train being sold or collected by the guard.

Despite new construction along the route of the line, passenger loadings were light and working expenses generally exceeded farebox revenue. The line was a candidate for wartime economies during the First World War and the halts at Bingham Road and Spencer Road were closed on 14 March 1915 upon which the railmotor service ceased, with full closure of the line following on 31 December 1916. The line was reopened and electrified by the Southern Railway on 30 September 1935. Bingham Road was rebuilt at a cost of £10,000, with brick entrances and covered staircases provided either side of the road underbridge, as well as concrete platforms covered by wood and steel glass canopies.

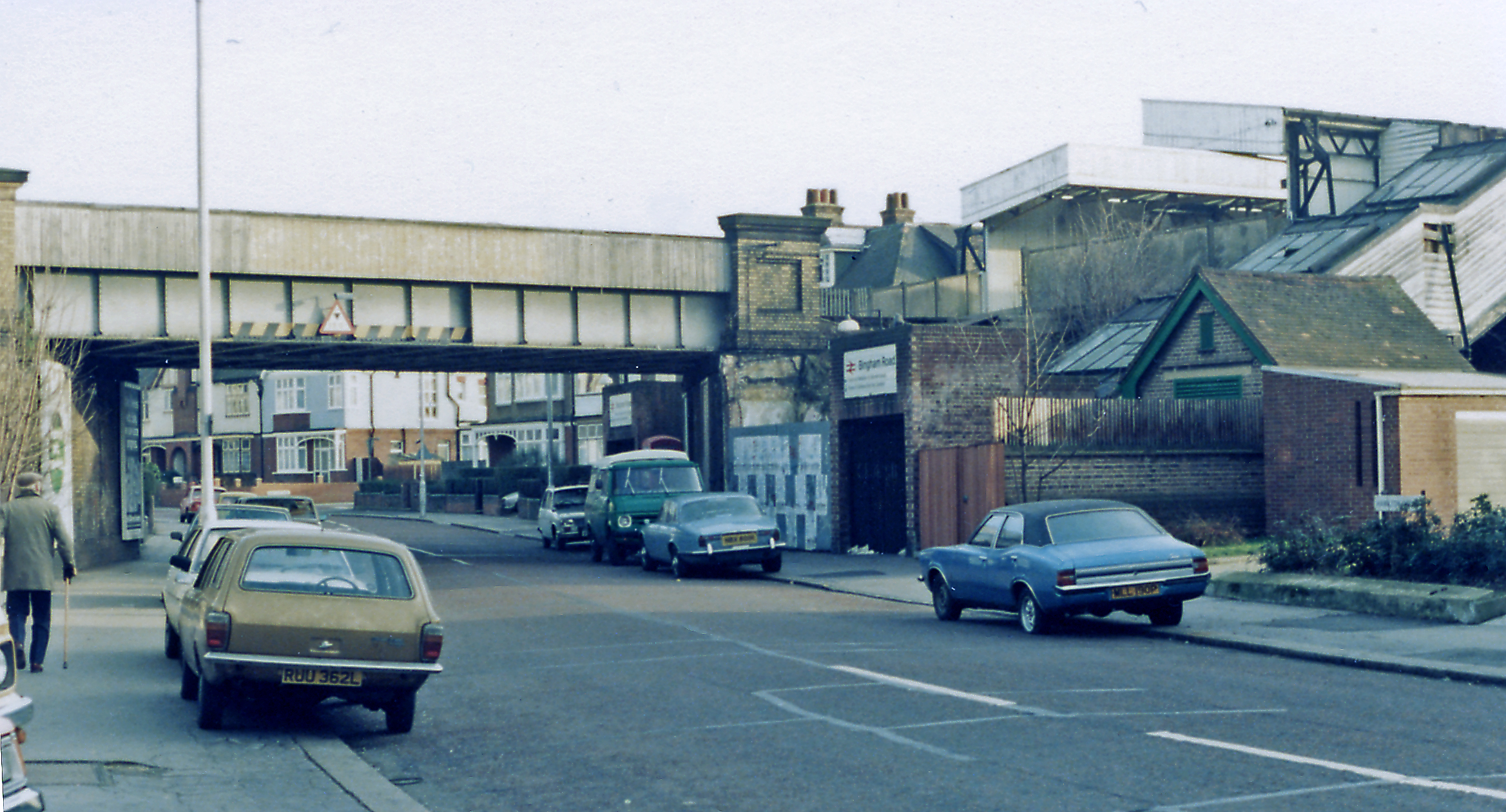
Station entrance in 1983.

Electrification was not a success and by 1949 the service was reduced to a peak-hours 2-car half-hourly shuttle from Elmers End. The station's platforms were nevertheless extended as part of a mid-1950s scheme to allow it to accommodate 10-car trains. Full closure was proposed in the Beeching Report but a reprieve was granted on the basis that some hardship would be caused. The line continued to be unprofitable and from 10 July 1967, Bingham Road and Coombe Road were only served between 07:52 to 09:50 and 16:17 to 19:10 on weekdays. A local pressure group was formed to fight the closure, claiming there was no alternative and, after several public meetings, the Ministry of Transport rejected the closure plans because of the hardship it would cause to the 650 daily passengers using the line. All through London services ceased in April 1976 leaving 2EPB 2-car sets to provide a shuttle service between Elmers End and Selsdon or Sanderstead. In 1980, a passenger count revealed that only 116 passengers were using Bingham Road daily. The inevitable closure of the line came in 1983, with the last train departing at 19:30 from Sanderstead on Friday 13 May and official closure following on 16 May.

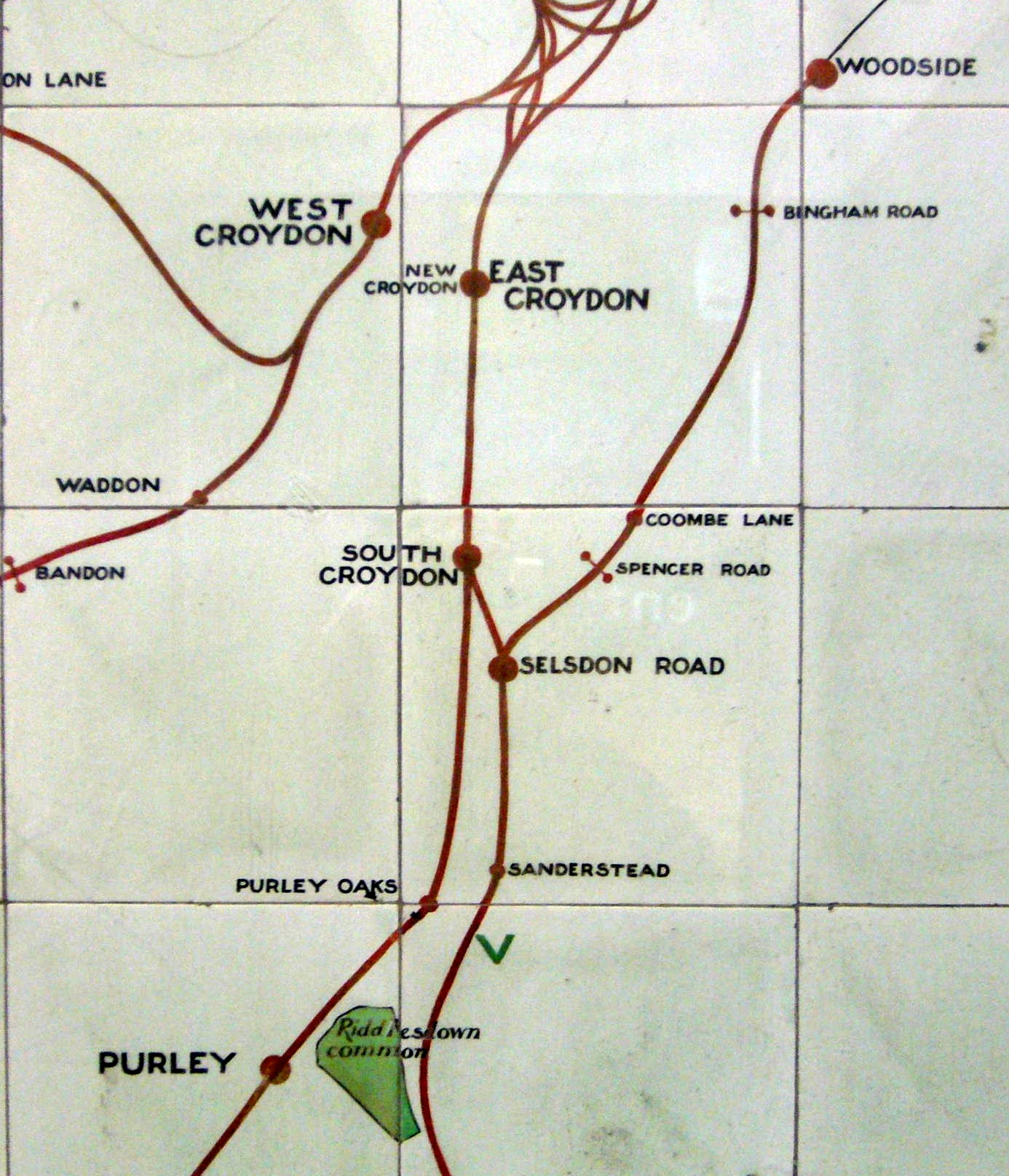
This map, still on display at Victoria Station, describes it as a "motor halt" (key to symbols)

The station featured in The Rebel (1961) starring Tony Hancock and George Sanders where it was known as Fortune Green South. The sequence showing the dress-code regimentation of the commuters on the platform should be compared to the reverie in which Anthony Steel indulges in Something Money Can't Buy, in 1952.

Preceding station	Disused railways	Following station
Woodside	British Rail Southern Region; Woodside and South Croydon Joint Railway	Coombe Road

== Present day ==
The track was lifted soon after closure and demolition of the wooden station buildings took place after they had been vandalised. Tramlink services reusing the railway alignment at Bingham Road commenced on 10 May 2000; the formation is no longer elevated as the former railway embankment has been removed and trams run on the level. A solitary fragment of broken wall which formed part of the old Up side entrance still remained in April 2003.

Addiscombe tram stop is on the north (ie. opposite) side of Bingham Road, using the site of the first halt.
