= Coombe Road railway station =

Former railway station in Croydon, south London

Coombe Road
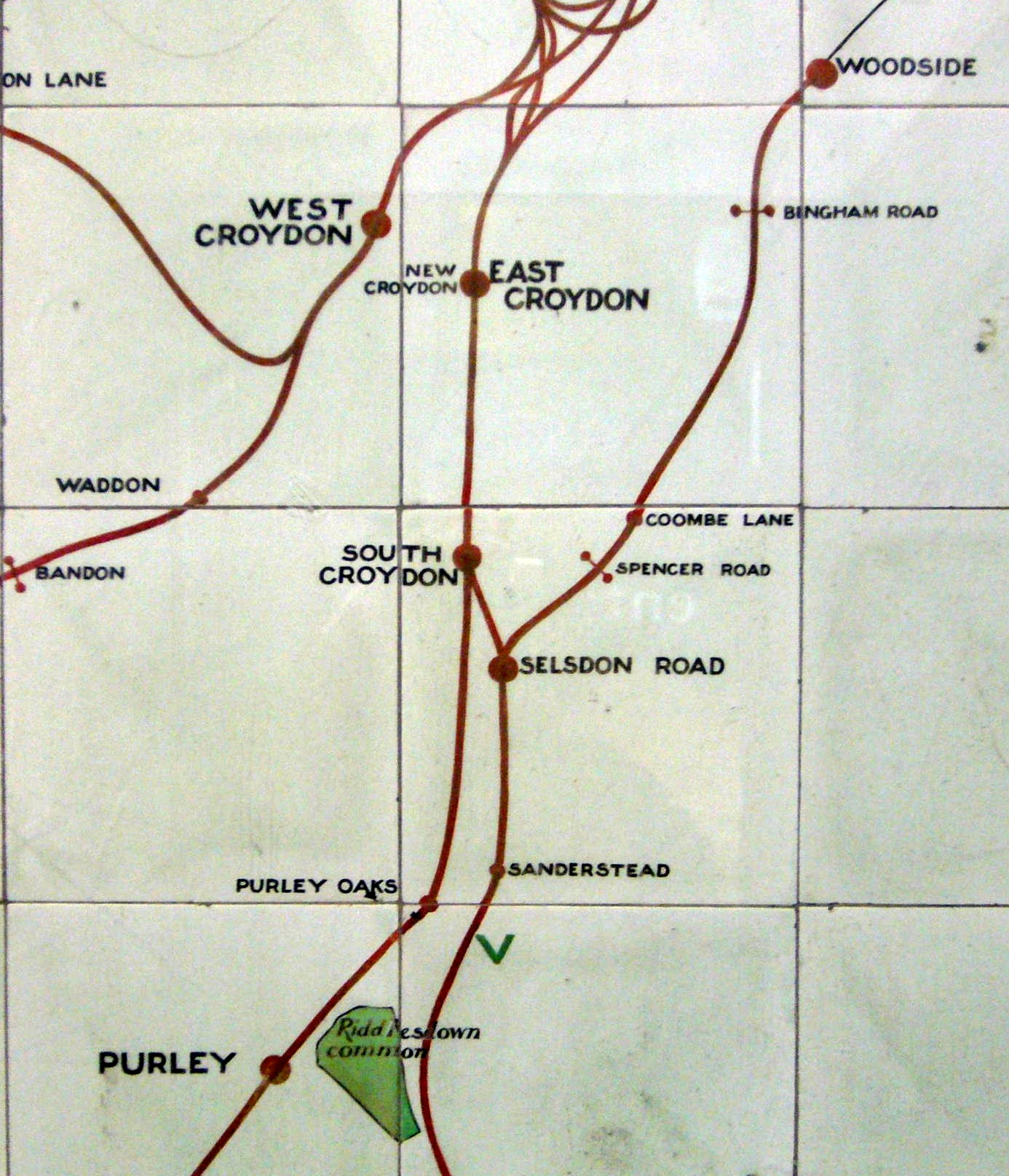
- Map showing the station's location
- Interactive map of Coombe Road

General information
- Local authority: London Borough of Croydon
- Number of platforms: 2

Railway companies
- Original company: Woodside and South Croydon Joint Railway
- Post-grouping: Southern Railway; British Rail

Key dates
- 10 August 1885: Opened as Coombe Lane
- 1 January 1917: closed
- 30 September 1935: Reopened, rebuilt and renamed
- 16 May 1983: Closed

Other information
- Coordinates: 51.364879°N 0.083608°W

Coombe Road was a railway station on the Woodside and South Croydon Joint Railway in London, opened in 1885. When it was closed in 1983 it was owned and managed by British Rail.

== History ==
A 2-mile-29-chain (3.8 km) link between the Mid-Kent Line at Woodside and the Oxted Line at Selsdon known as the Woodside and South Croydon Joint Railway was authorised in 1880. Opened on 10 August 1885, it was jointly worked by the London, Brighton and South Coast Railway and the South Eastern Railway. with the only intermediate station at Coombe Lane.

As part of a scheme to increase patronage using Kitson steam railmotors designed by Wainwright, a railway halt was provided on the north side of Bingham Road in Addiscombe on 1 September 1906. Spencer Road Halt, also on the Woodside and South Croydon line, was opened on the same day, part of four such halts in the London area; the others being Bandon Halt and Beeches Halt. Despite new construction along the route of the line, passenger loadings were light and working expenses generally exceeded farebox revenue. The line was a candidate for wartime economies during the First World War and the halts at Bingham Road and Spencer Road were closed on 14 March 1915 upon which the railmotor service ceased, with full closure of the line following on 31 December 1916.

The line was reopened and electrified by the Southern Railway on 30 September 1935. The former Coombe Lane station was completely rebuilt and given the name Coombe Road. Electrification was not a success and by 1959 the service was reduced to a peak-hours 2-car half-hourly shuttle from Elmers End. The station's platforms were nevertheless extended as part of a mid-1950s scheme to allow it to accommodate 10-car trains. Full closure was proposed in the Beeching Report but a reprieve was granted on the basis that some hardship would be caused. The line continued to be unprofitable and from 10 July 1967, Bingham Road and Coombe Road were only served between 07:52 to 09:50 and 16:17 to 19:10 on weekdays. All through London services ceased in April 1976 leaving 2EPB 2-car sets to provide a shuttle service between Elmers End and Selsdon or Sanderstead. The inevitable closure of the line came in 1983, with the last train departing at 19:30 from Sanderstead on Friday 13 May and official closure following on 16 May.

== Present day ==
The track was lifted and the station buildings were demolished within one year after closure. Tramlink services reusing the railway alignment at Coombe Road commenced on 10 May 2000. A tramstop (Lloyd Park tram stop) was constructed 200 metres to the east of the former station to serve the same area.

Preceding station	Disused railways	Following station
Bingham Road	British Rail Southern Region; Woodside and South Croydon Railway	Spencer Road halt
