= Addiscombe tram stop =

Tram stop in London, England

Addiscombe
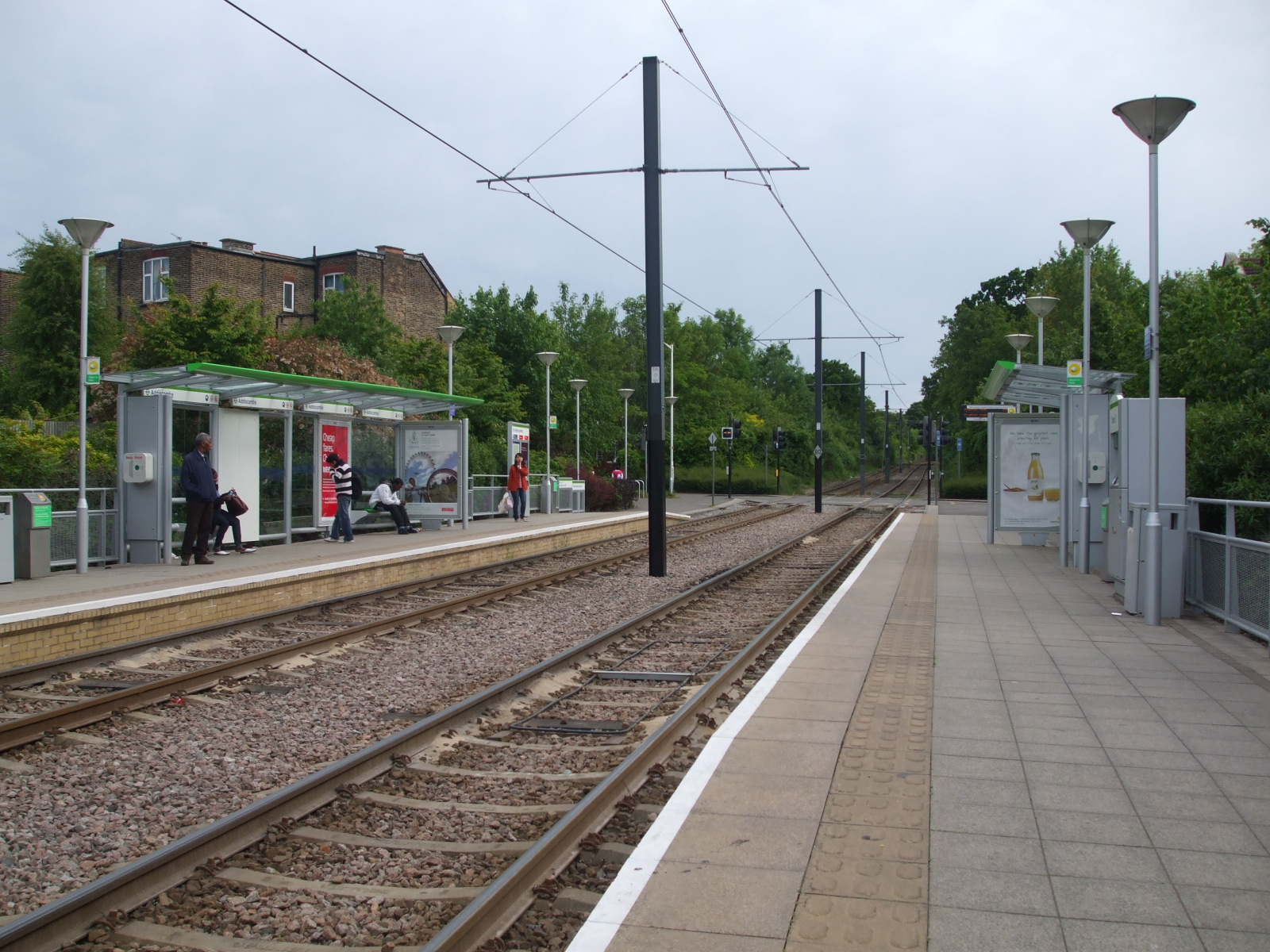
- Viewed from the north.

General information
- Location: Lower Addiscombe Road, Croydon
- Coordinates: 51.3799°N 0.0732°W
- Operated by: Tramlink
- Platforms: 2

Construction
- Structure type: At-grade
- Accessible: Yes

Other information
- Status: Unstaffed
- Website: Official website

History
- Opened: 23 May 2000
Location
- Location in Croydon

Addiscombe tram stop is a light rail stop in the London Borough of Croydon in the southern suburbs of London.

== History ==
The tram stop is built on the site of Bingham Road Halt on the Woodside and South Croydon Railway which was closed in 1915. Outside the station was the eastern terminus of the Croydon–Addiscombe electric tram service that closed on 28 March 1927. A new railway station Bingham Road opened in 1935 was situated on the other (south) side of Bingham Road, but closed in 1983. The same railway's Addiscombe station was located on a branch line, about 500 metres to the west.

== Location ==
The tram stop is located between Bingham Road and Lower Addiscombe Road, on a section of line which follows the trackbed of the former Woodside and South Croydon Railway. However the former railway was on an embankment at this point and crossed over both roads on bridges. During construction of Tramlink, the embankment was removed, the bridges replaced with level crossings and the tram stop built at street level.

London Buses routes 289, 312 and 367 serve bus stops near the tram stop. Free interchange for journeys made within an hour is available between trams and buses as part of Transport for London's Hopper fare.

== Services ==
The typical off-peak service in trams per hour from Addiscombe is:

- 6 tph in each direction between Beckenham Junction and Wimbledon
- 6 tph in each direction between Elmers End and Wimbledon

Services are operated using Bombardier CR4000 and Stadler Variobahn model low-floor trams.

Preceding station	Tramlink	Following station
Sandilands towards Wimbledon	Tramlink; Wimbledon to Beckenham Junction	Blackhorse Lane towards Beckenham Junction
Sandilands towards Wimbledon	Tramlink; Wimbledon to Elmers End	Blackhorse Lane towards Elmers End
