= Addiscombe railway station =

Closed railway station in London, England

Coordinates: 51.379618°N 0.081535°W

Addiscombe
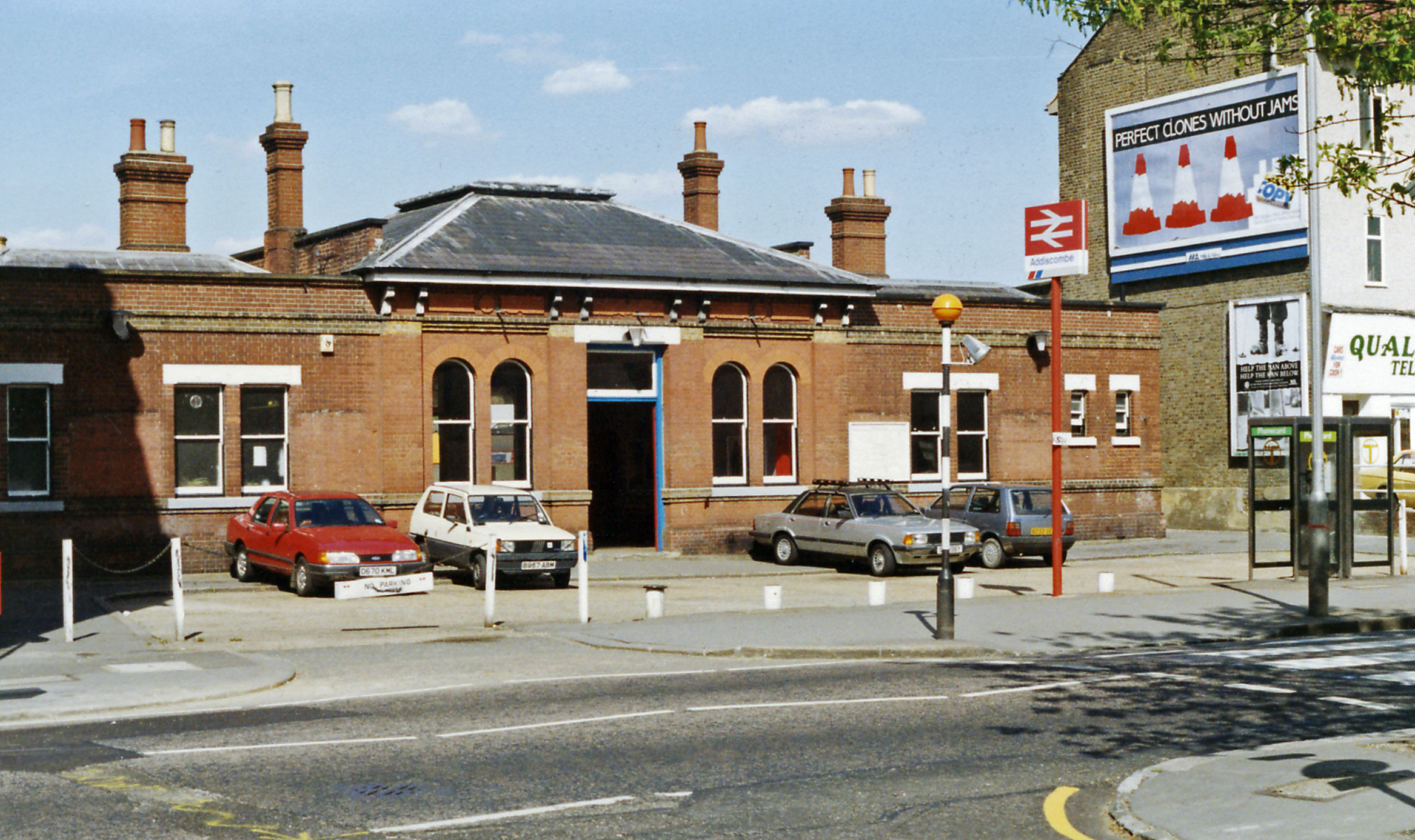
- The station building in April 1990

General information
- Location: Addiscombe, London Borough of Croydon; England
- Platforms: When built: 3 At closure: 1

Other information
- Status: Disused

History
- Original company: Mid-Kent Railway
- Pre-grouping: South Eastern Railway
- Post-grouping: Southern Railway

Key dates
- 1 May 1864: Station opened as Croydon (Addiscombe Road)
- 1 April 1925: Renamed Croydon (Addiscombe)
- 28 February 1926: Renamed Addiscombe (Croydon)
- 13 June 1955: Renamed Addiscombe
- 31 May 1997: Last train ran
Location

Addiscombe railway station was a terminus to the east of central Croydon, on Lower Addiscombe Road between Hastings Road and Grant Road. The East India Way housing development stands on the site.

== History ==
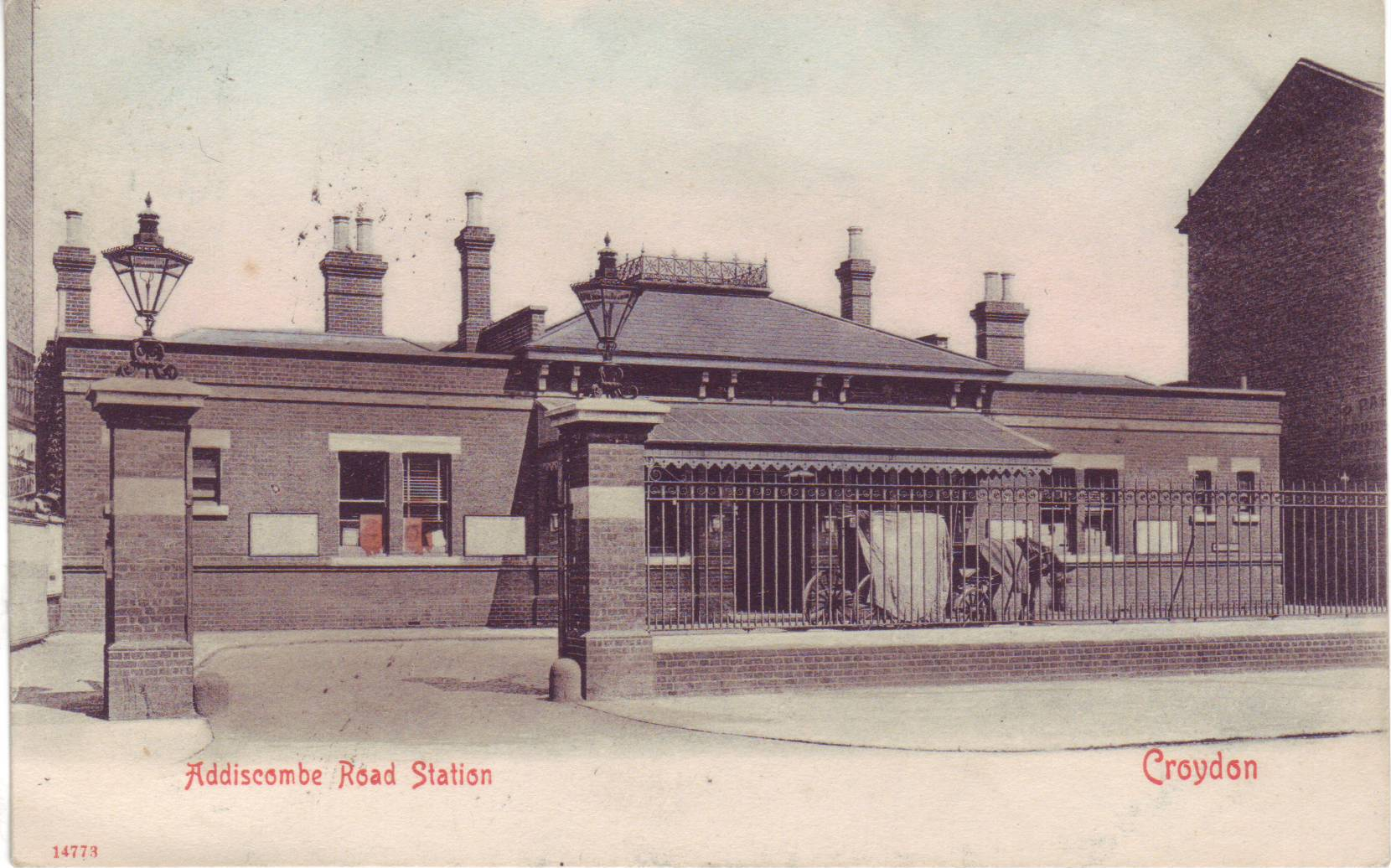
A postcard of the station building before 1906

Opened by the Mid-Kent Railway, it was part of the South Eastern Railway, which became part of the Southern Railway at the Grouping of 1923. Addiscombe station was built with three platforms with extensive canopies, a fairly large station building and concourse, but the station was slowly run down after the Second World War.

After nationalisation in 1948 the line became part of the Southern Region of British Railways.

In 1956 platform 3 was closed and removed, and the goods yard closed in 1968. Later regular through trains to London were withdrawn and the service reduced to a shuttle service to and from Elmers End. In 1993 the carriage depot was closed and around the same time the station became unstaffed with a PERTIS ticket machine outside the entrance.

When sectorisation was introduced, the station was part of Network SouthEast until the privatisation of British Rail, which Connex South Eastern took over. During its last years it received the station code "ACM" and was in travelcard zone 5.

When the signal box was burnt down in 1996, the line was reduced to a single track operation and only platform 2 was used. The last train (an enthusiasts' railtour) was on the evening of Saturday 31 May 1997, which also visited the West Croydon–Wimbledon line, also closed that day.

The station was closed in preparation for the construction of Tramlink, opening in 2000 along the former line from Elmers End to Woodside, then following the line towards Sanderstead, which had closed in 1983. Addiscombe tram stop is half a mile to the east.

The station was demolished in 2001 and the site was used for the East India Way housing development – named after the East India Company Military Seminary which was located nearby. All that survives are sections of the walls formerly supporting the canopy and station buildings. Part of the line beyond has become Addiscombe Railway Park. There had been a bid for the station to house a working railway museum, which Croydon Council opposed.

Preceding station	Disused railways	Following station
Woodside	Connex South Eastern; Addiscombe Line	Terminus
