= Bandon Hill =

Bandon Hill may refer to:

- Bandon Hill primary school
- Bandon Hill Cemetery
- Bandon Hill railway station
