= Southern Heights Light Railway =

Overview
- Locale: Kent and Surrey, United Kingdom

Technical
- Track gauge: 4 ft 8 1/2 in (1,435 mm) (proposed)
- Electrification: Third rail (proposed)
- Length: 15 miles 64 chains (25.43 km) (proposed)

The Southern Heights Light Railway (SHLR) was to have been a speculative London area suburban electric railway between Orpington, Kent and Sanderstead, Surrey. It was authorised in 1928 under the Light Railways Act 1896, but ultimately not constructed. The engineer was to have been Colonel Holman Fred Stephens, heavily involved in the promotion of light railways.

== History ==
=== Plotlands ===
The context of the scheme lay in the suburban development of a remote rural area near the crest of the North Downs on the Kent-Surrey border, comprising the tiny hamlet of Biggin Hill in the former together with the small but ancient village of Tatsfield in the latter.

This locality was an early example of a plotland development, of which many examples sprang up in countryside around major cities in the first half of the 20th century. The process involved speculative developers buying up failed country farms or estates, and dividing the land into portions or plots of about an acre which were then sold off to individuals to do with as they pleased. This was before the existence of laws governing planning permission. The results were usually settlements of poor quality residences lacking utilities and social services, accessed by unmade tracks.

The Aperfield Court Estate at Biggin Hill was bought by a London speculator called Frederick Dougal in 1889,. He divided up the land into plots which he sold off for £10 each with a £1 deposit (£1300 in 2020 values, £130 down). However, interest was limited by the remoteness of the locality. Such plotlands only became popular with the arrival of private road vehicles.

=== Orpington, Cudham and Tatsfield Light Railway ===
The answer here was the promotion of a speculative branch railway from Orpington on the South Eastern Railway, with the hope that this would encourage interest in suburban development. The Orpington, Cudham and Tatsfield Light Railway Company (OCTR) was therefore incorporated in 1898, with Colonel Holman Fred Stephens as the engineer.

The company obtained the Orpington, Cudham, and Tatsfield Light Railway Order 1902, authorising construction of a 7.5 mile (12 km) line which was to be completed in four years. Authorised capital was £70 000, and the South Eastern Railway was to work the line once completed. Unfortunately, investment was not forthcoming and construction did not begin.

=== Route of the OCTLR ===
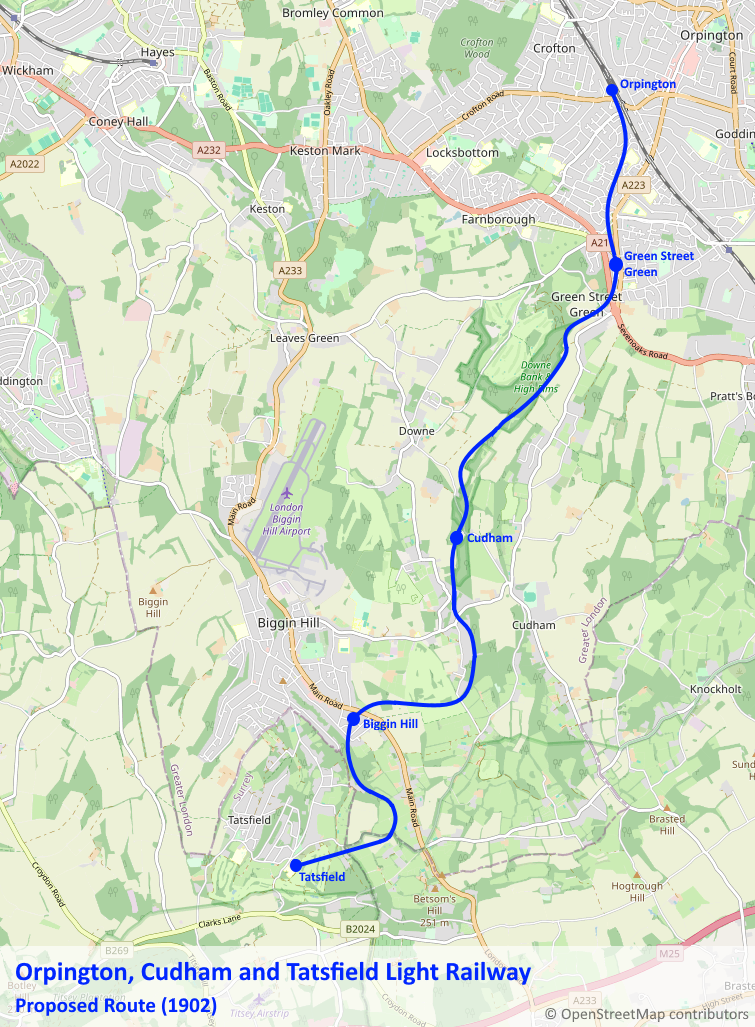
Orpington Cudham and Tatsfield Light Railway Proposed Route (1902)

The 1902 proposal involved a line running due south of Orpington to a station at Green Street Green, just south of the road called Farnborough Hill and west of High Street. It then turned south-west to run up the valley occupied by Cuckoo Wood to Cudham station at Hang Grove Hill. From there hugged the east side of Berry's Green before turning due west to Biggin Hill station on the present A233 road, about the south end of Aperfield Road. It then ran south-east and south to cross Tansfield Lane, then paralleled that road westwards to its terminus of Tatsfield station where Tatsfield Primary School used to be, by the crossroads at the top of Church Hill.

=== SHLR proposal ===
The OCTLR was defunct after 1906. However, the scheme was revived in a more ambitious form when the Southern Heights Light Railway was proposed in the mid 1920s. Colonel H. F. Stephens was the engineer again, forming a personal link between the two schemes, and he was also to be a major promoter in his own right despite calling himself the "Agent to the Promoters".

The SHLR scheme first drew wider public attention in March 1925, when an inquiry into the proposed line was held at Orpington, Kent. It was to have been a single track railway constructed across the North Downs from Orpington to Sanderstead. In a departure from Stephens' usual practice, there were to have been no level crossings at all on the line, which would have required 23 bridges to have been built. Construction of the line would have required the excavation of 631,000 cubic yards (482,000 m^{3}) of material.

The line was to have been electrified by the third rail system, and was to have been operated by the Southern Railway as part of its suburban electric railway network. Passenger trains would have been operated by electric multiple units, with steam locomotives handling goods trains.

The Southern Railway involvement was vital. That company's chairman, Sir Herbert Ashcombe Walker, addressed its board on the scheme's behalf in February 1926, just before the application for a light railway order. The total cost he estimated to be £800,000, so it was proposed that the capital applied for was to be £900 000. £600 000 of this was to be in ordinary shares and £300,000 to be in guaranteed interest debentures. Sir Herbert obtained the board's approval for the SR to guarantee the interest on the latter, and to work the line in return for 75% of the gross receipts. Also, approval was given for the SR to invest in the scheme, and to have the option to purchase at cost price within five years of completion. In return, two of the SHLR directors were to be nominated by the SR board.

A subsequent meeting of the board, in the same month, fixed the SR investment at £150 000, which was intended to pay for the cost of electrification.

=== SHLR approval ===
The Southern Heights Light Railway Order 1928 (SR&O 1928/265) was granted provisionally on 29 December 1928. Instead of the expected share capital of £600,000, only £500,000 was authorised. Simultaneously, the SHLR and SR signed a working agreement. Notably, this specified that the line was to be single, but was to be engineered to allow for future double track. Also, timetabling and fares were to be the responsibility of the SR. The latter began to include the scheme in its publicity, notably on its system maps.

A revised estimate of the cost of purchasing land and erecting necessary buildings (that is, excluding that of building the actual railway line) was given as £575,000. Only three of the proposed stops were to be built as full stations, and the company requested that level crossing be allowed "where necessary" (this was in contradiction to the scheme's original publicity).

The provisional nature of the LRO involved certain conditions: The authorised capital was to be raised, and the land purchased, within two years, which meant that the authorisation would lapse at the end of 1930. In that year, Colonel Stephens made a fund-raising trip to the United States, with no success.

=== Failure ===
The LRO lapsed in December 1930, as the capital could not be raised.

In January 1931, as a result, a new LRO was applied for and authorisation was sought to deviate from the authorised route in an effort to reduce construction costs by £17,245. The line was to have taken a different route in the parishes of Cudham, Tatsfield and Titsey, on the Kent/Surrey border.

The scheme faded away in the 1930s, after Colonel Stephens died in October 1931 and the scheme lost its main promoter. The death blow had already been given in July of that year, when the SR board decided not to support the application for a new LRO and the scheme was deleted from SR publicity.

=== Legacy ===
The only construction that started was south of Orpington station on the east side of the line; some excess spoil was delivered to the site during the 1930s ready for construction. The SR had to electrify a connection to the proposed western junction at Sanderstead, and chose the previously failed Woodside and South Croydon Joint Railway. This would have allowed a loop service from the former South Eastern Railway London termini, running Lewisham - Woodside - Sanderstead - Orpington - Lewisham and vice versa. Despite the SR's abandonment of support in 1931, electrification works already in hand were allowed to go ahead, and electric trains from London termini to Sanderstead via Woodside began in 1935. They were to continue until 1983, latterly as a very poorly patronised peak-hours shuttle service.

== Stops ==
The proposed line would have served eight stops between Orpington and Sanderstead, three of which were to be full stations with goods services. The other five were to be "halts", for passengers only.

- Orpington
- Green Street Green for Farnborough (1 mile 7 chains (1.75 km)).
- Downe and Keston (3 miles 5 chains (4.93 km)).
- Cudham and Biggin Hill (5 miles 14 chains (8.33 km)).
- Westerham Hill (station) (6 miles 11 chains (9.88 km)).
- Tatsfield (station) (8 miles 9 chains (13.06 km)).
- Chelsham for Warlingham (11 miles 44 chains (18.59 km)).
- Hamsey Green (station) (12 miles 5 chains (19.41 km)).
- Mitchley Wood (14 miles 12 chains (22.77 km)).
- Sanderstead (15 miles 64 chains (25.43 km)).

== Route ==
The scheme's proposed route was on the dip slope of the North Downs, so the roughly S-shaped route entailed continuous ascending gradients from Orpington to the summit on the crest of the Downs near Tatsfield, then similarly continuous descending gradients to Sanderstead.

The circuitous nature of the route meant that the proposed railway would not have attracted through traffic, especially since there was no direct passenger connection allowed for to the Brighton main line near Sanderstead. So, the railway was envisaged entirely as a suburban commuter route to the London termini. Given this, it is noticeable that the proposed stops were quite widely spaced compared to the Southern Railway's London suburban lines in general.

The topography added a further complication, this being the need to avoid crossing the several steep-sided narrow valleys which dissect the dip slope, and which would have required viaducts. This put serious constraints on the choices for the route.

At Orpington station there was to have been a diving junction, so that the SHLR down trains would not have to cross the main line here. South of Orpington station on the east side of the line some excess spoil was delivered to the site during the 1930s ready for construction and in 2023 was still in situ. Green Street Green Halt would have been around the junction between Shire Lane and Farnborough Hill, west of the station site proposed for the earlier OCTR. This was because the SHLR proposed a different, longer route to Tatsfield via the valley up which Shire Lane runs. This valley curves south to the east of Leaves Green and Biggin Hill Airport, and Downe and Keston Halt would have been around New Hill Road. Cudham and Biggin Hill would have been around Jail Lane.

The first true station with goods services, Westerham Hill, would have been in South Street (the actual hill is away to the south). Here, the line would have turned west to the second true station at Tatsfield. The fact that two out of three of the true stations proposed for the line were so close together is an indication that the focus of the scheme was very much on the Biggin Hill - Tatsfield suburban development. Beyond Tatsfield would have been the route's summit, at Botley Hill (the highest point on the North Downs).

The route would then have followed the Croydon Road (the present B269) to Chelsham for Warlingham Halt around Chelsham Road -this was a long stretch without any stop proposed. The third true station would have been at Hamsey Green, where the line would have crossed the Limpsfield Road (B269). Mitchley Wood Halt would have been around the west end of Mitchley Hill, near the junction with the A2022, and would have been substantially nearer the old village of Sanderstead than the SR station of the same name. Mitchley Wood survives mostly intact as a semi-natural ancient woodland. From there, the route would have hugged the slope of Purley Downs, cutting through the golf course to descend to the junction with the SR's Oxted line.

The actual junction was to have been at the bridge carrying Purley Downs Road over the Oxted line, and unlike at Orpington this junction would have been on the level.
