= Woodside railway station (London) =

Former railway station in Croydon, London

Woodside
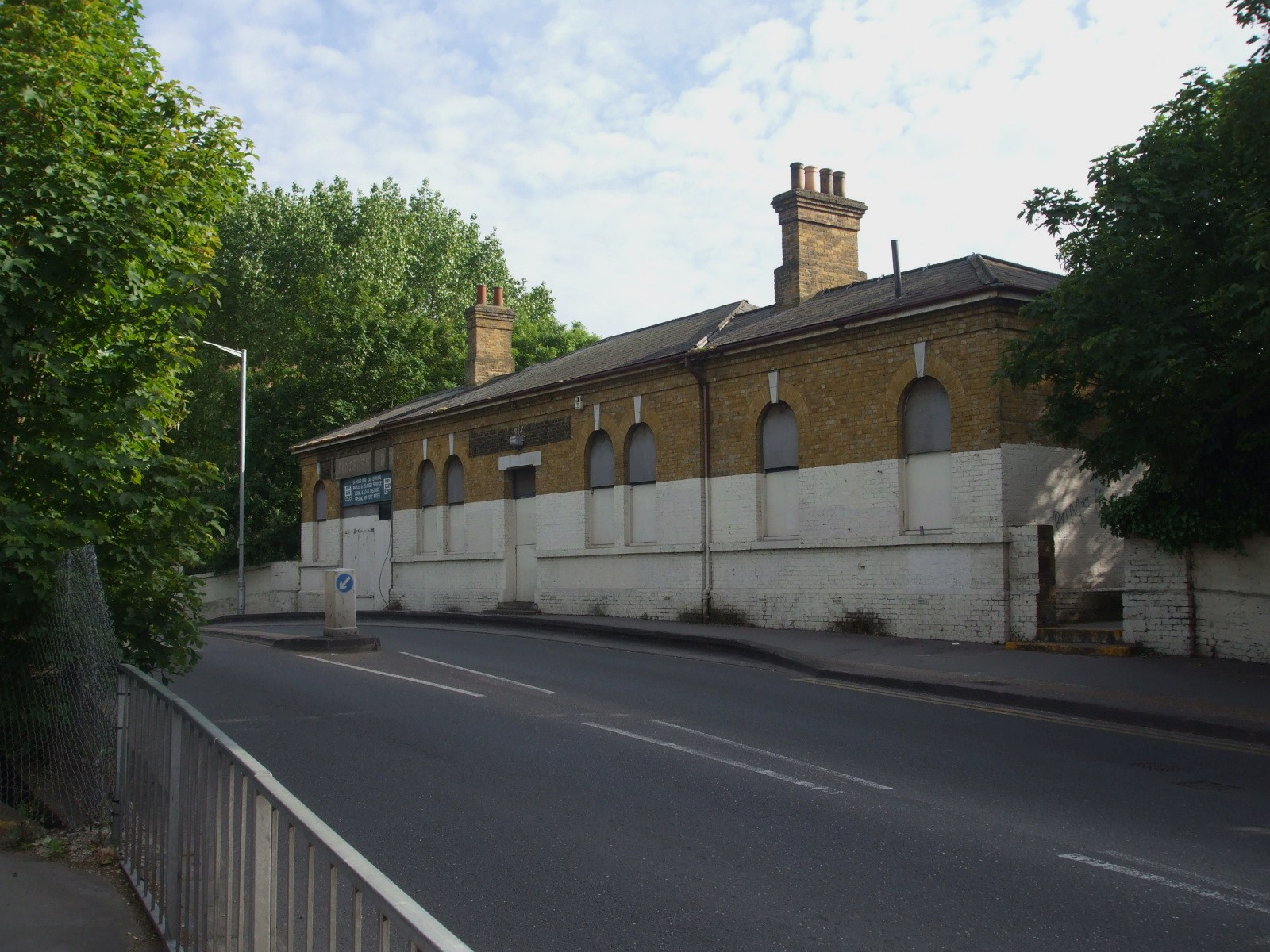
- Interactive map of Woodside

General information
- Location: Woodside
- Local authority: London Borough of Croydon
- Number of platforms: 3 until 1917; 2 until 1996; then 1 until closure

Railway companies
- Original company: South Eastern Railway
- Pre-grouping: South Eastern and Chatham Railway
- Post-grouping: Southern Railway

Key dates
- 1871: Opened as Woodside
- 1 October 1908: renamed Woodside and South Norwood
- 2 October 1944: renamed Woodside
- 31 May 1997: Last train ran
- Replaced by: Woodside tram stop

Other information
- Coordinates: 51.3874°N 0.0647°W

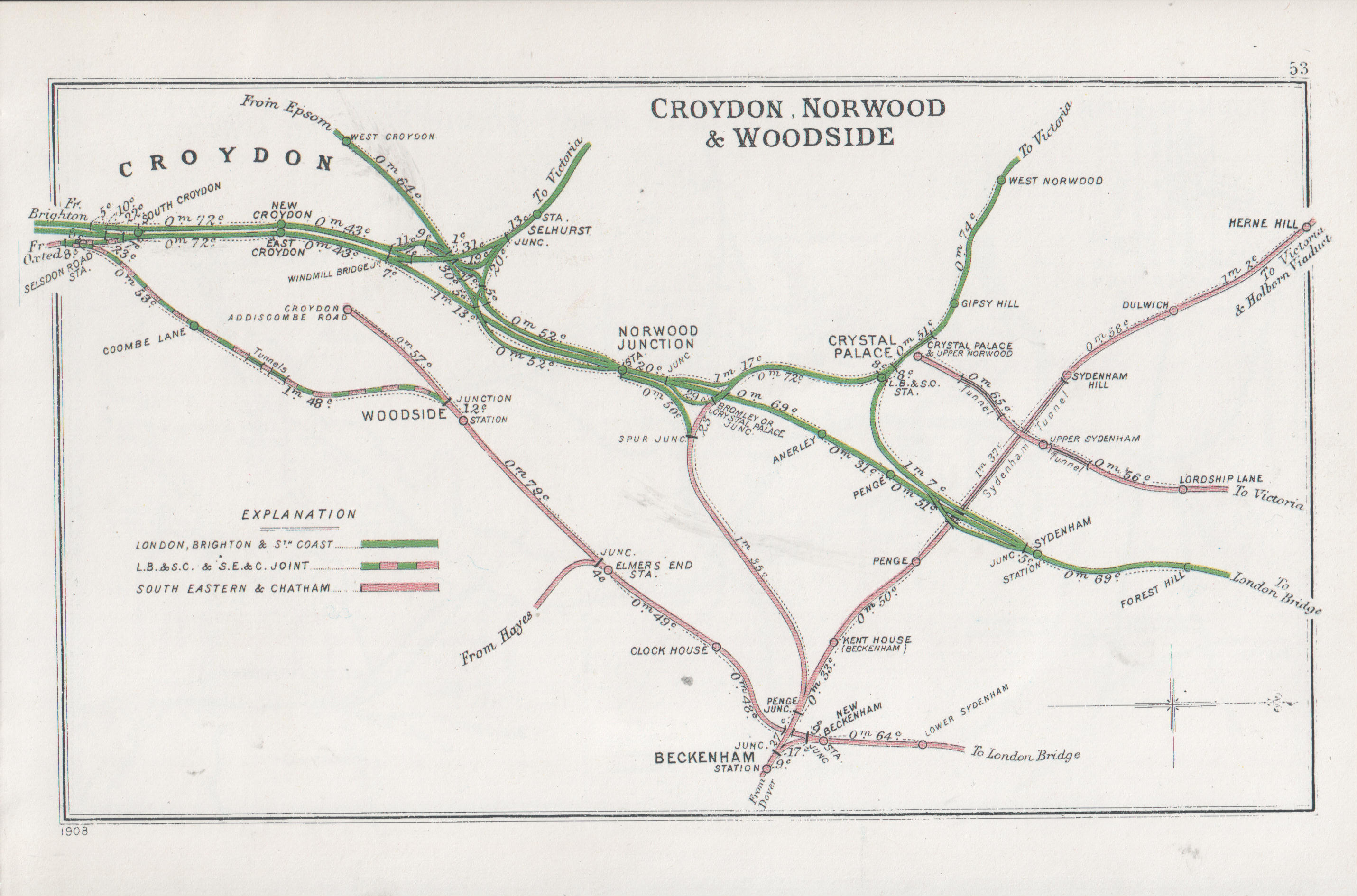
A 1908 Railway Clearing House map of part the Woodside and South Croydon Railway, showing the surrounding lines.

Woodside was a railway station in Croydon, south London, on the Woodside and South Croydon Joint Railway. The South Eastern Railway opened the station in July 1871 to serve the nearby Croydon racecourse. A ramp from the station facilitated the loading of racehorses. The station has since been replaced by Woodside tram stop.

After the racecourse closed in 1890, use of Woodside station decreased. The down bay platform fell into disuse in 1917 following the closure of the line to Selsdon. The line to Selsdon reopened upon electrification in 1935, with through services to and from London. However, there were drastic reductions in the train service during World War II, from which the line never really recovered. From October 1939 the station was served by a shuttle to and from Elmers End. Through weekday trains to London were reinstated in the spring of 1948, but traffic on the branch was in decline and a shuttle service was again instituted again in 1950, with a handful of through London services in the peak hours. The small goods yard closed in 1963. The line to Selsdon once again closed in 1983, this time permanently, and the signal box at the south end of the down platform closed in 1984.

The station building, situated over the platforms at street level, was de-staffed from 1993 and boarded up. In 1996 the signal box at Addiscombe burned down and single-line working was introduced, with all trains using the down line; the London-bound platform fell into disuse. The station closed in 1997 in preparation for the construction of Tramlink.

Tramlink now uses the line between Elmers End and the site of Coombe Road. Most of the previous platforms were demolished and new tram platforms constructed. Part of the London-bound platform was left to provide a pathway to the tram platforms, using stairs to the street-level building, which is abandoned. Following closure of the Addiscombe branch the trackbed has become Addiscombe Railway Park.

The dismantled platform was donated to the Swanage Heritage Railway and reassembled in 2009 at Herston Halt.

| Preceding station | Disused railways | Following station |
|---|---|---|
| Elmers End | Connex South Eastern; Addiscombe Line | Addiscombe |
| Elmers End | Southern Region; Woodside and South Croydon Railway | Bingham Road |
