= Addiscombe Line =

Branch line in south east London, England

Coordinates: 51.3869°N 0.0655°W

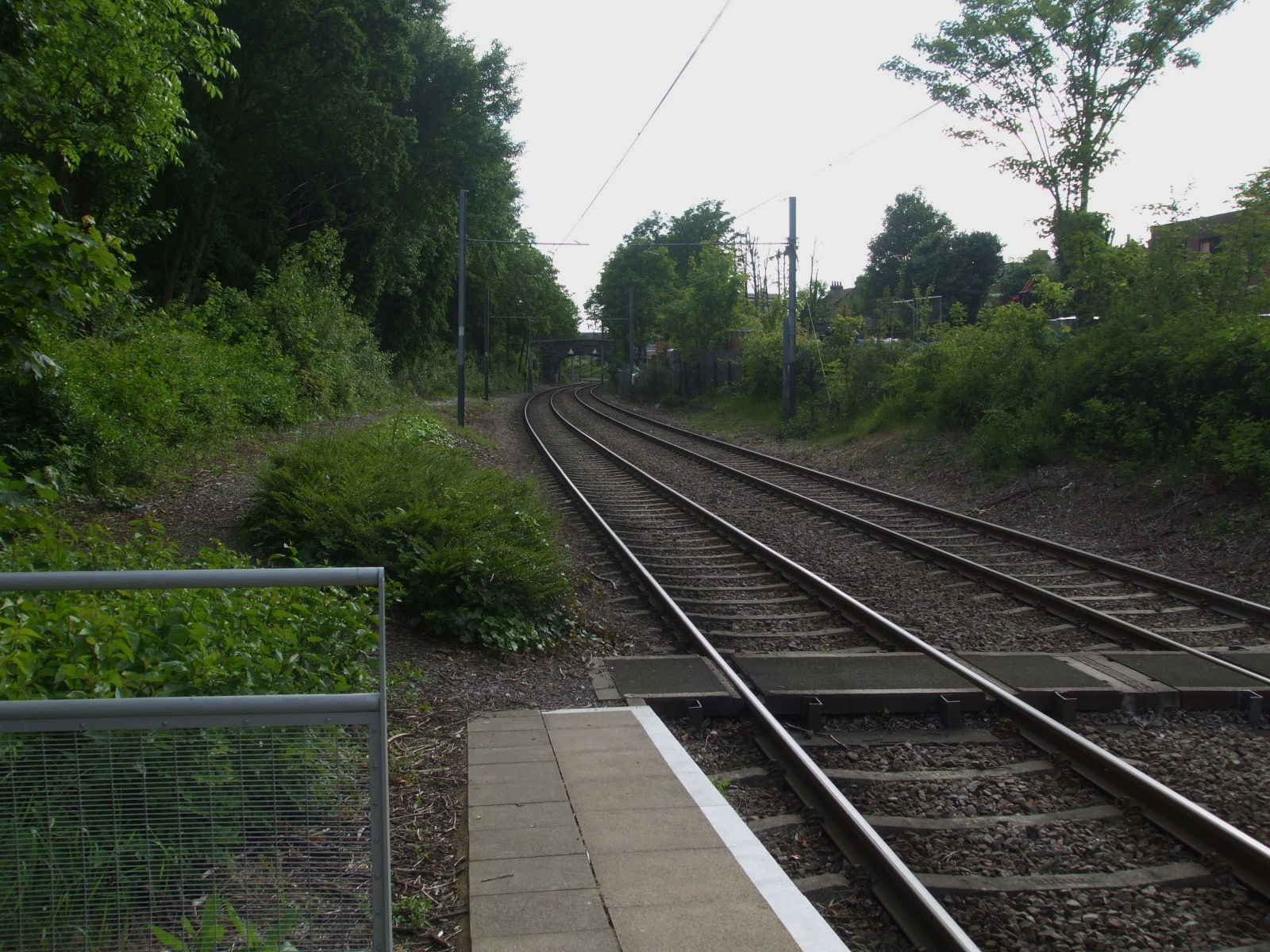
Woodside tramstop looking south

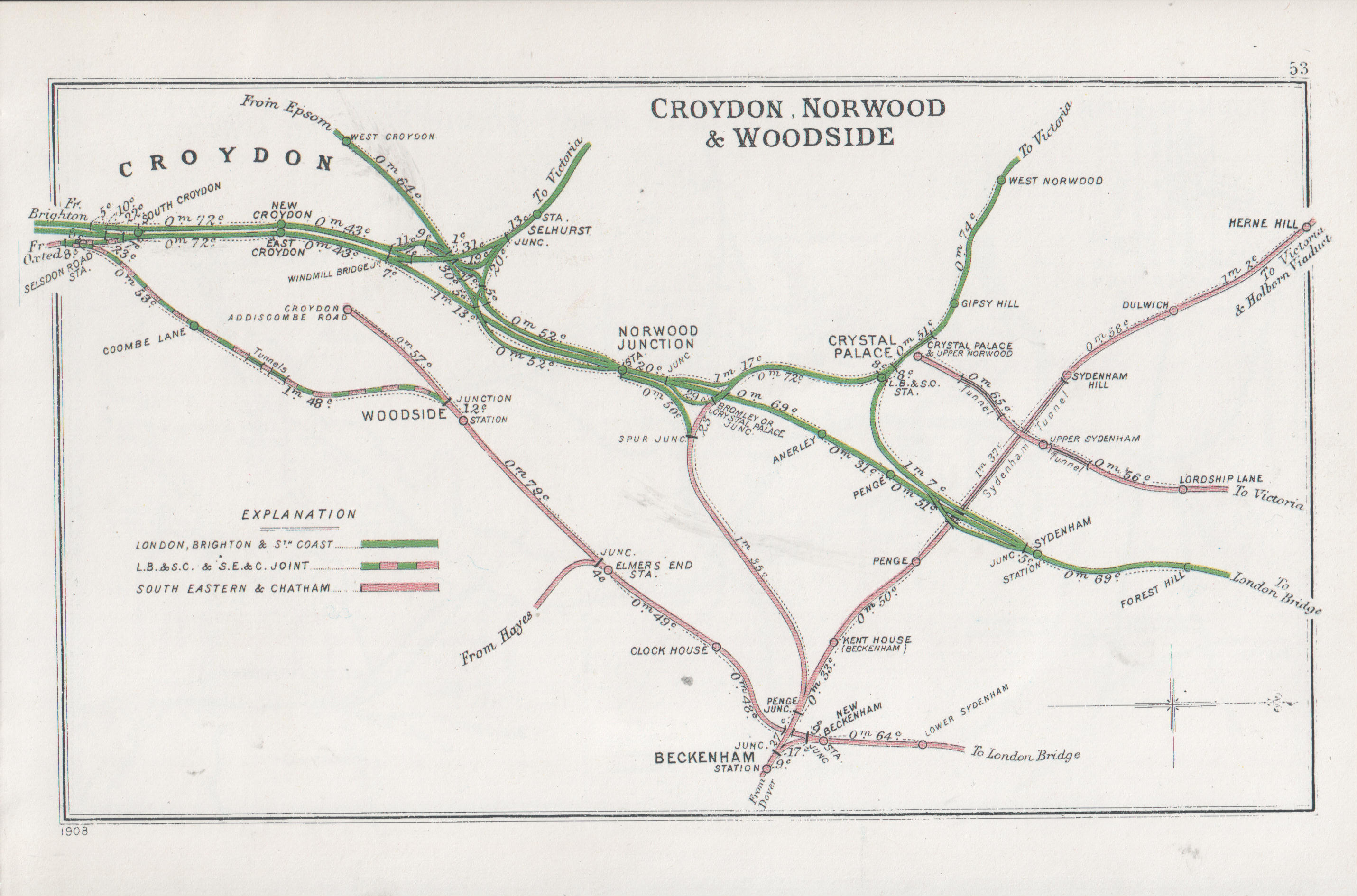
A 1908 Railway Clearing House map of lines around the Addiscombe Line

The Addiscombe Line was a branch line in south east London, United Kingdom, that ran between Elmers End (London Borough of Bromley) and Addiscombe (London Borough of Croydon).

== History ==
The line was built by the South Eastern Railway (SER) as part of its extensive competition with London, Brighton and South Coast Railway (LBSCR). A proposed extension to Redhill was opposed by the LBSCR, therefore it was dropped. In 1885, Woodside opened. The branch line was electrified by the Southern Railway (SR) in February 1926 at 660 V (later 750 V) DC third rail. The line between Woodside and Selsdon reopened in 1935 with the electrification. All services started or terminated at a London terminus until the Second World War, when a shuttle to Elmers End commenced. Through weekday trains were reinstated in 1948, but passenger traffic was starting to decline.

In 1983, the line from Woodside to Selsdon was closed and the following year Woodside signal box was abolished. By the early 1990s the line went into decline, starting with the closure of the carriage depot at Addiscombe in 1993. Shortly afterwards, the stations at Addiscombe and Woodside became unstaffed. In 1996, the line was reduced from double to single track following Addiscombe signal box being destroyed by fire. The line permanently closed in 1997 for Tramlink construction from Elmers End and Beckenham Junction to Wimbledon via the West Croydon to Wimbledon Line, also an under-used line which closed on the same day as the Addiscombe line.

The track was removed in 1998 and Addiscombe station was demolished in 2001. The route between Woodside and Addiscombe has now become Addiscombe Railway Park and the site of Addiscombe station has become the East India Way housing development.
