= Addiscombe Railway Park =

Park in the London Borough of Croydon, England

Coordinates: 51°22′56″N 0°04′42″W

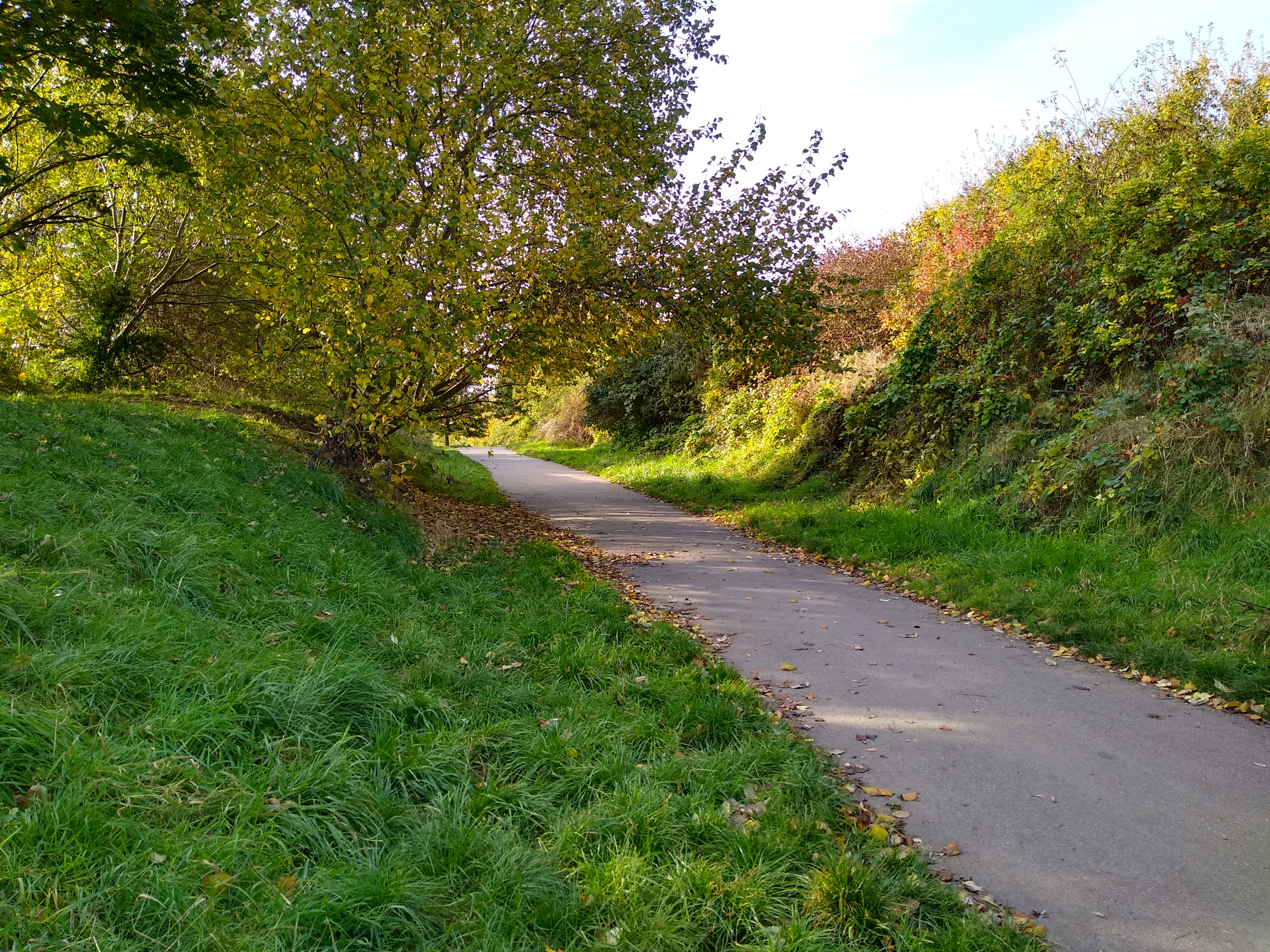
- Interactive map of Addiscombe Railway Park
- Type: Public park
- Location: Addiscombe
- Area: 3.3 acres (1.3 ha)
- Opened: 2007
- Operator: London Borough of Croydon
- Open: All year
- Public transit: Tramlink to Blackhorse Lane or bus to Lower Addiscombe Road

Addiscombe Railway Park, also known as the Addiscombe Linear Park, is a 3.3 acres (1.3 ha) park in Addiscombe, South London, managed by the London Borough of Croydon.

The first section of the park was opened on 26 May 2007, with the second stage opened on 15 March 2010. The bus services which serve the site of Addiscombe station are London Buses routes 289, 312 and 367 while route 197 runs closely parallel to the park. The nearest tram stop is Blackhorse Lane.

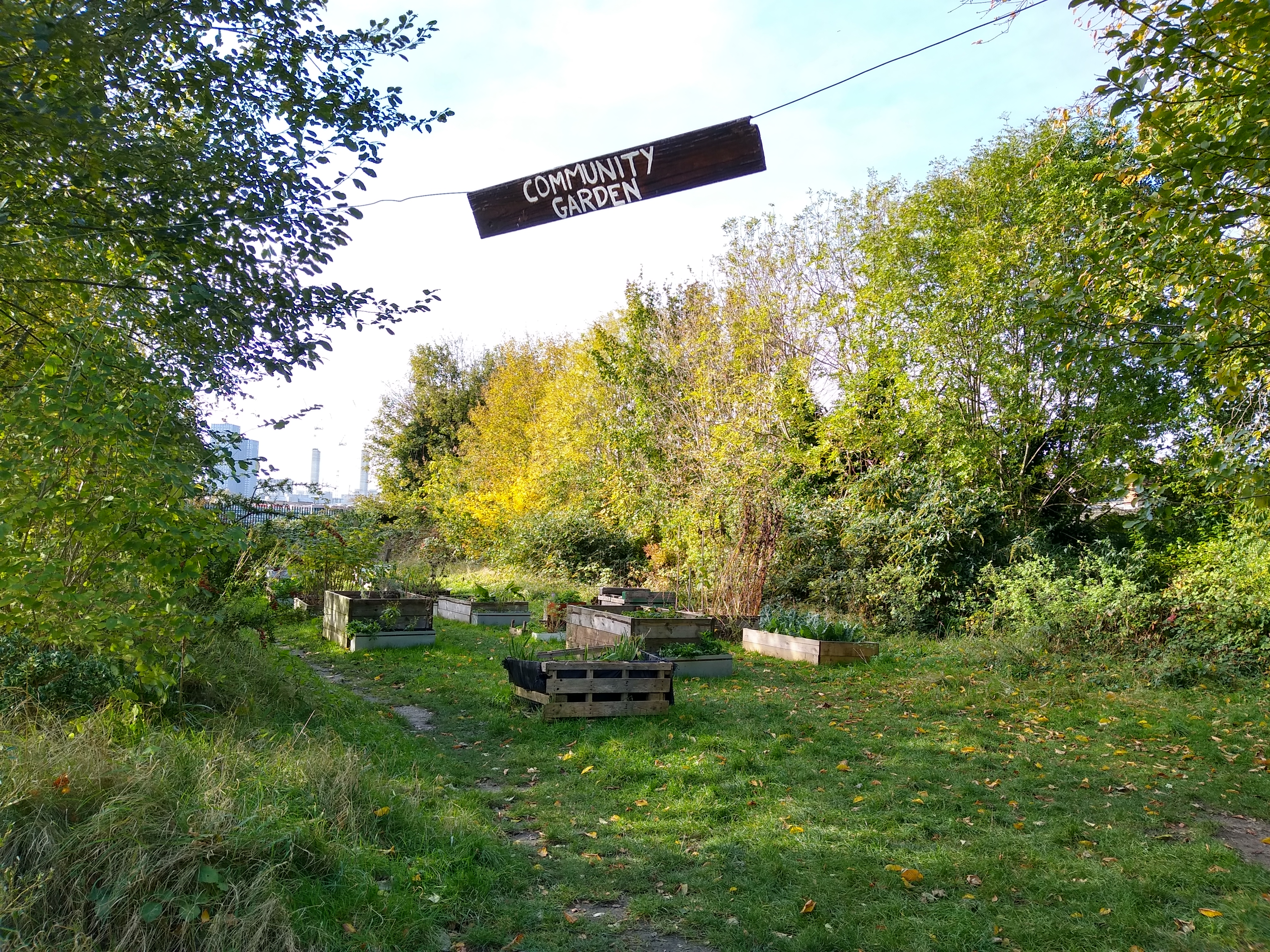
Community garden

== Former use ==
It occupies the track route and green buffering land of the demolished Addiscombe Line, a short railway that ran between Lower Addiscombe Road and Woodside Junction near Blackhorse Lane tram stop, a branch line off what was the Woodside and South Croydon Joint Railway (WSCJR). The site of Addiscombe railway station has been turned into housing. Most of the route of the WSCJR, the parent line, is part of Tramlink.

== See also ==
- List of Parks and Open Spaces in Croydon
