= Spencer Road Halt railway station =

Former railway station in England

Spencer Road Halt
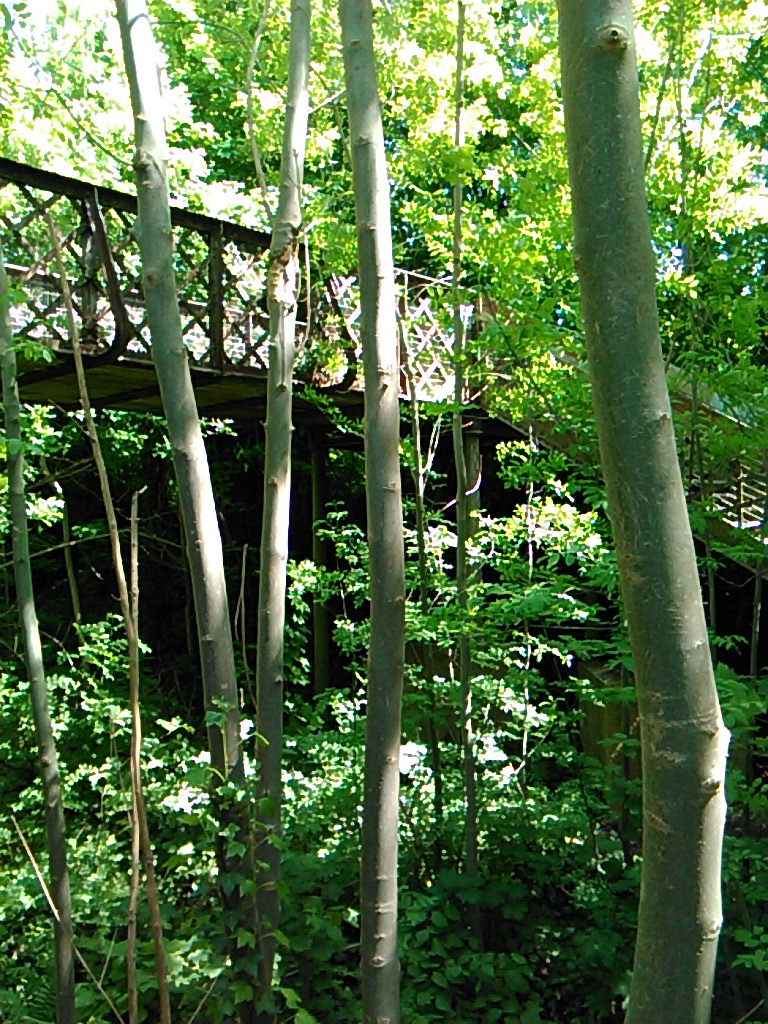
- The footbridge over the station in 2018, the line beneath overgrown with trees
- Interactive map of Spencer Road Halt

General information
- Location: South Croydon
- Local authority: Croydon
- Grid reference: TQ332643
- Owner: Woodside and South Croydon Joint Railway
- Number of platforms: 2

Key dates
- 1 September 1906: Opened
- 15 March 1915: Closed

Other information
- Coordinates: 51.3620°N 0.0877°W

Spencer Road Halt railway station was a halt on the Woodside and South Croydon Railway opened in 1906 and closed on 15 March 1915.

== History ==
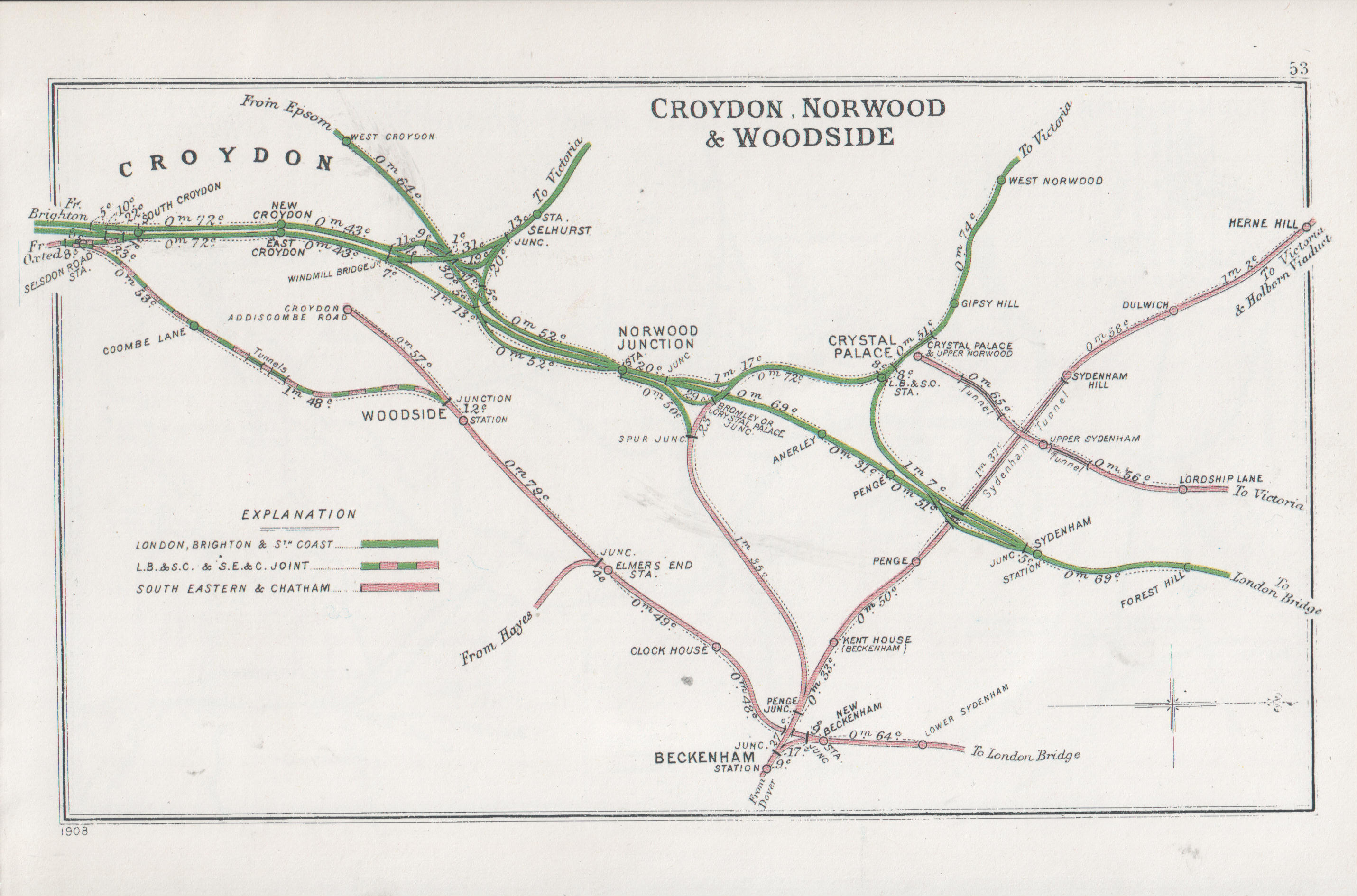
Spencer Road halt is not shown on this 1908 Railway Clearing House map but it was (top left) between Coombe Lane and Selsdon Road on the joint London, Brighton and South Coast and South Eastern and Chatham Railways.

The site is hidden in an alleyway between Spencer Road and Birdhurst Rise in South Croydon. The railway had hoped that passengers would change to the Brighton Line by making the ten-minute walk to South Croydon station but very few did. Spencer Road was among several new stations and halts opened in the suburbs, including Reedham and Bandon, to compete with the convenience of electric trams and to a lesser extent omnibuses, whose effect was being felt on railway income particularly with regard to shorter journeys.

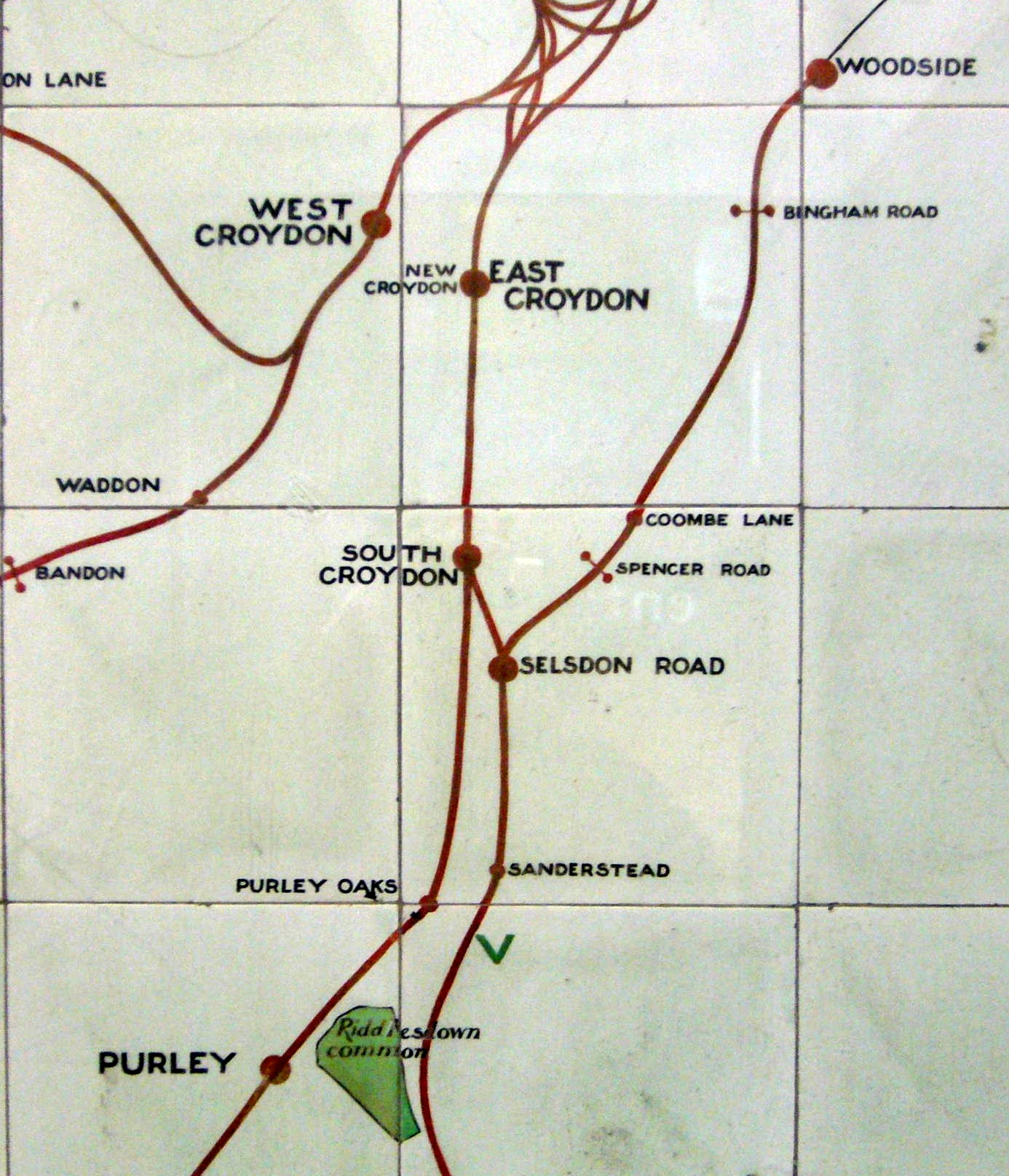
This map, still on display at Victoria Station, describes it as a "motor halt" (key to symbols)

Apart from a metal footbridge which carried the path between Spencer Road and Birdhurst Rise over the line, the halt consisted of just a pair of wooden platforms and nameboards. Oil lamps were also likely to have been provided. The platforms were reached from wooden gates on either side of the footbridge; a notice adjoining the gate was headed "Woodside and South Croydon Railway" and warned passengers against taking a short-cut over the railway line and use the footbridge.

The halt closed in 1915 as a wartime economy, but remained intact until at least 1931. The remains were cleared by the Southern Railway in preparation for reopening and electrification of the line in 1935. An up starter signal for Selsdon on a post made of old rails was subsequently installed on the site of the Up platform, and during the Second World War a tank trap was built on the site of the Down platform.

Preceding station	Disused railways	Following station
Coombe Lane	LB&SCR and SER; Woodside and South Croydon Railway	Selsdon Road

== Present day ==
The halt has been demolished but the footbridge remains in use. As of 2020 the double track was still in place but heavily overgrown. The nearby overbridge crossing Croham Road is also extant.
