= Sanderstead railway station =

National Rail station in London, England

Sanderstead
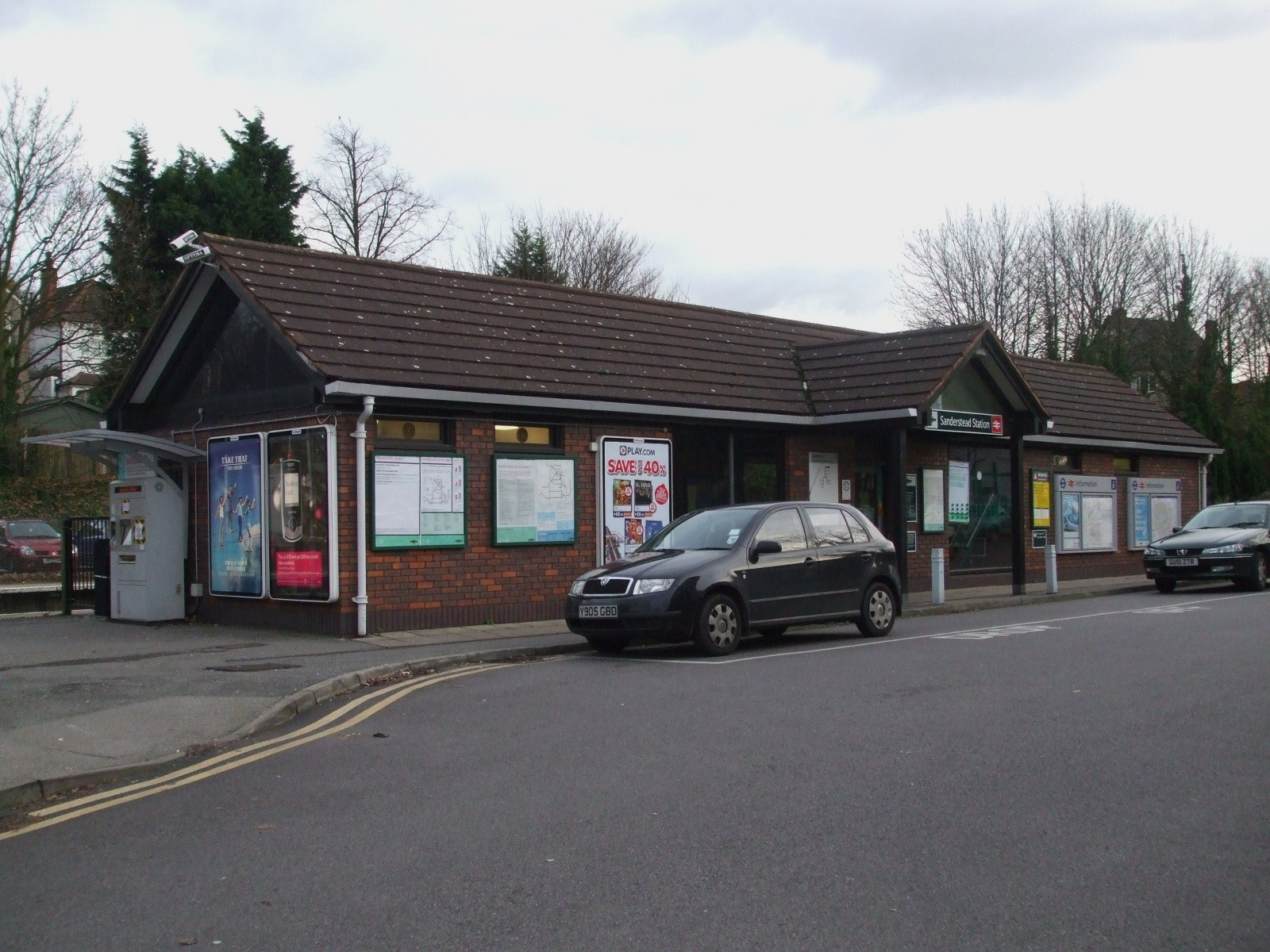
- Sanderstead Station
- Interactive map of Sanderstead

General information
- Location: Sanderstead
- Local authority: London Borough of Croydon
- Managed by: Southern
- Station code: SNR
- DfT category: D
- Number of platforms: 2
- Fare zone: 6

National Rail annual entry and exit
- 2020–21: ▼0.212 million
- 2021–22: ▲0.508 million
- 2022–23: ▲0.624 million
- 2023–24: ▲0.780 million
- 2024–25: ▲0.844 million

Key dates
- 10 March 1884: Opened

Other information
- External links: Departures; Facilities
- Coordinates: 51.3484°N 0.094°W

Sanderstead railway station is on the Oxted Line in the London Borough of Croydon, 1 mile (1.6 km) from Sanderstead village. It is in London fare zone 6, 12 miles 23 chains (12.29 miles, 19.77 km) from London Bridge. The station is managed by Southern.

On the up (London-bound) platform is a ticket office, staffed for most of the day, and a self-service ticket machine is outside the station on the up side: there is no PERTIS (Permit to travel) machine. Purley Oaks, also in London fare zone 6, is nearby.

== History ==
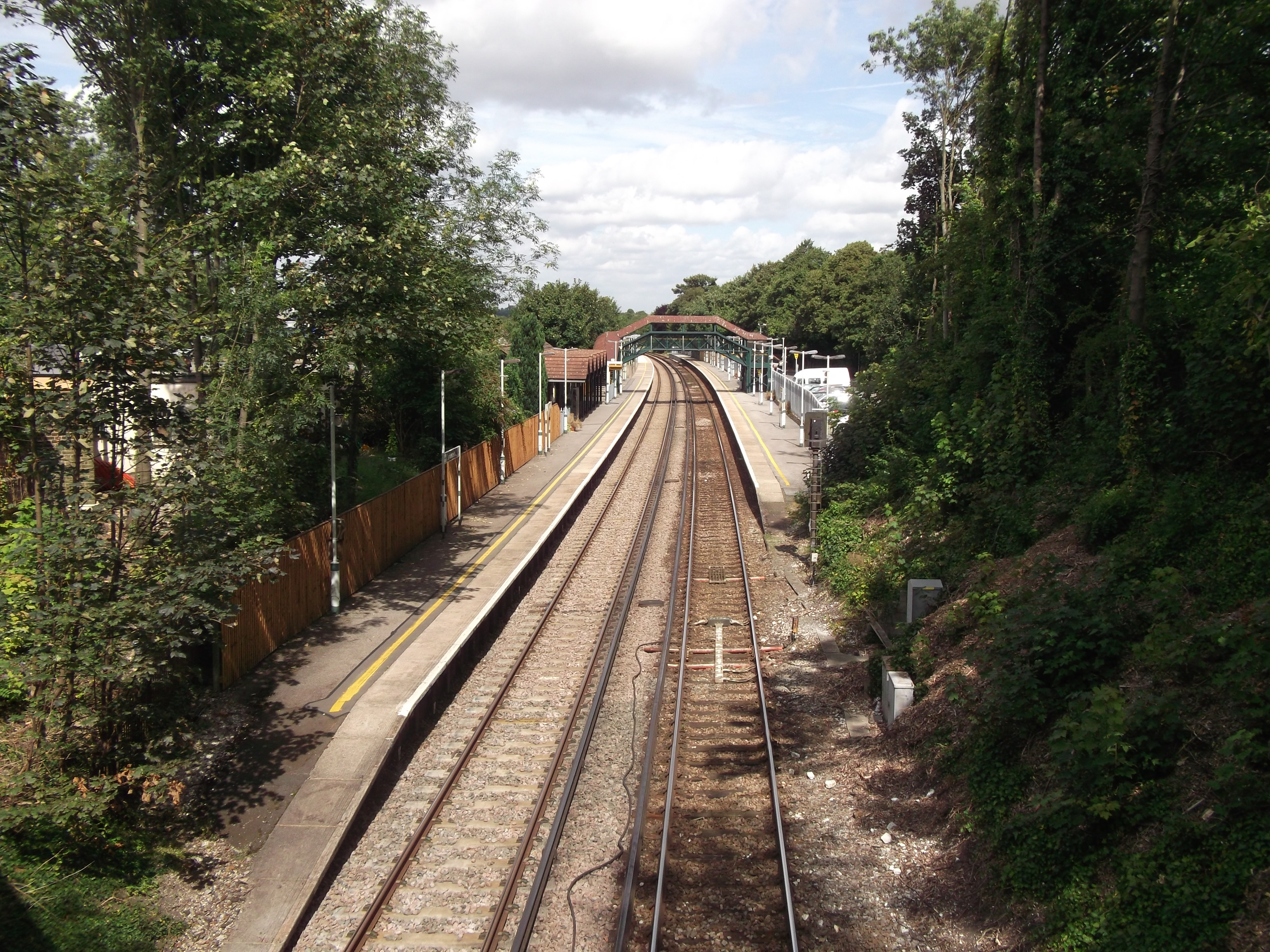
Sanderstead station looking north from the bridge carrying Sanderstead Road over the line.

The station was opened on 10 March 1884 by the London, Brighton and South Coast Railway and the South Eastern Railway with their line between South Croydon and East Grinstead. The population was around 300, rising to 534 by 1901.

In 1913 the station was set alight in an act of arson. The suffragette Elsie Duval was the main suspect. The replacement building was weather-boarded, cheap to construct but requiring regular maintenance. An extensive bookstall was on the up platform, and a signal box on the down platform.

In 1928 the Southern Heights Light Railway was approved, which would have left the Oxted line south east of the station and finished at Orpington. On it would have run a loop service from Charing Cross to Lewisham and then Woodside-Sanderstead-Orpington and back, or vice versa. However, the scheme could not attract investment and was moribund even before electrification of the Woodside and South Croydon Joint Railway as its first stage. This was from Woodside to Selsdon and over a short section of the Oxted Line to Sanderstead, and was completed in 1935. This route terminating at Sanderstead involved the only electric train service at the station until 1984.

These electric trains, on the Woodside and South Croydon Railway via Selsdon to Elmers End, ran from 1935 until the line closed in 1983; at that time, fewer than 150 people were using the service per day, which operated only on weekdays at peak hours to Elmers End.

Electrification of the South Croydon-Selsdon and Sanderstead-East Grinstead sections of the Oxted Line was approved by BR in the early 1980s: South Croydon-Selsdon was electrified in 1984 using some redundant materials from the closed Woodside-Selsdon line, and a London Bridge to Sanderstead electric train service begun.

The station building was destroyed by fire again in June 1986, and a new brick building opened in September 1987. The signal box closed on 2 November 1985, and was demolished in August 1987.

Electrification to East Grinstead was completed in October 1987.

== Services ==
Off-peak, all services at Sanderstead are operated by Southern using Class 377 EMUs.

The typical off-peak service in trains per hour is:

- 2 tph to London Victoria
- 2 tph to East Grinstead via Oxted

During the middle of the day on Mondays and Tuesdays, this service is reduced to one train per hour.

During the peak hours, there are also Thameslink operated services between East Grinstead, London Bridge and Bedford. These services are operated using Class 700 EMUs.

Preceding station	National Rail	Following station
East Croydon or South Croydon	Southern Oxted Line	Riddlesdown
East Croydon or South Croydon	Thameslink: Bedford to East Grinstead; Peak Hours Only	Riddlesdown
	Disused railways	
Selsdon	British Rail; Southern Region Woodside and South Croydon Railway	Terminus

== Connections ==
London Buses route 403 serves the station.
