= Woodside and South Croydon Joint Railway =

UK railway company

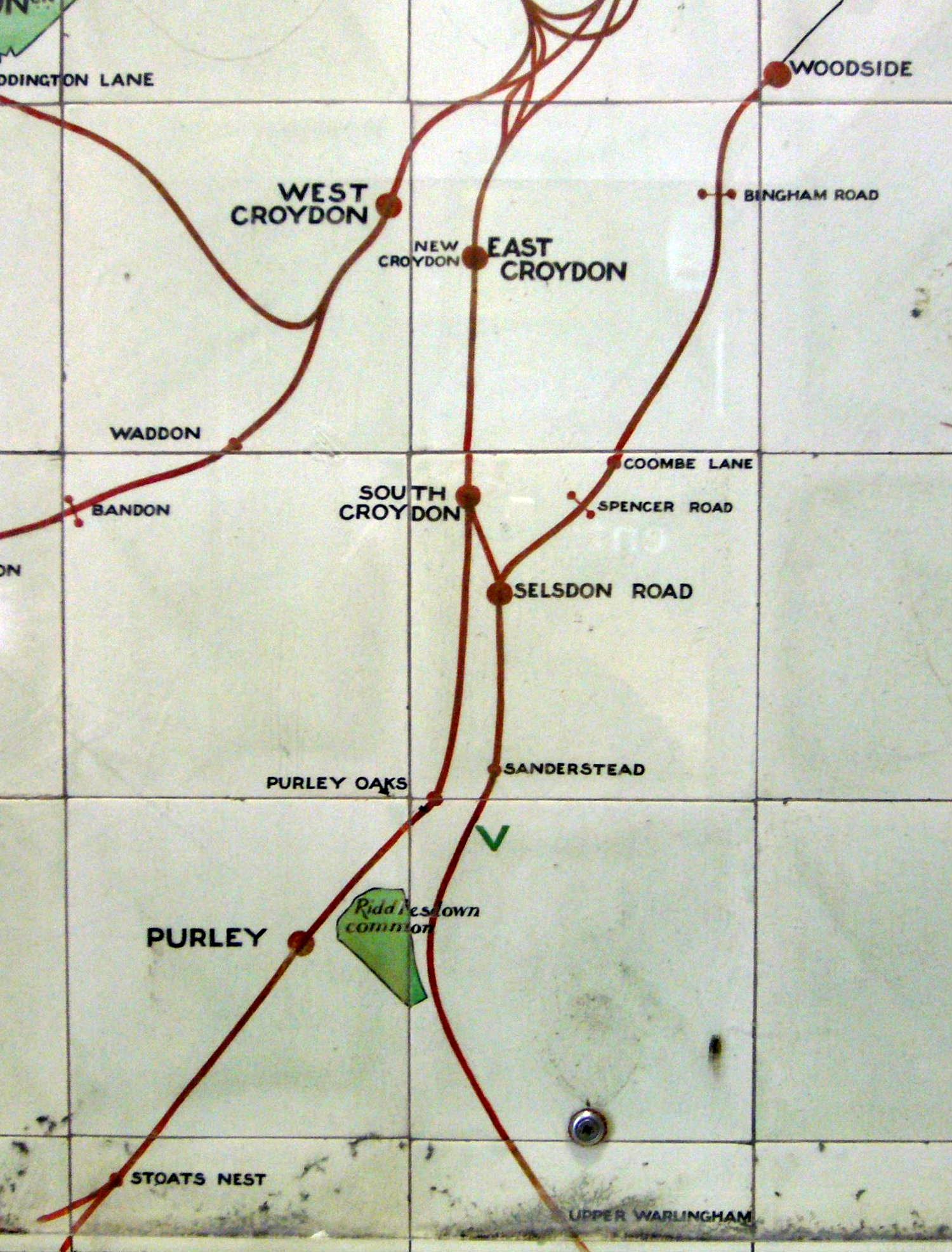
Part of a map of the suburban network of the LBSCR

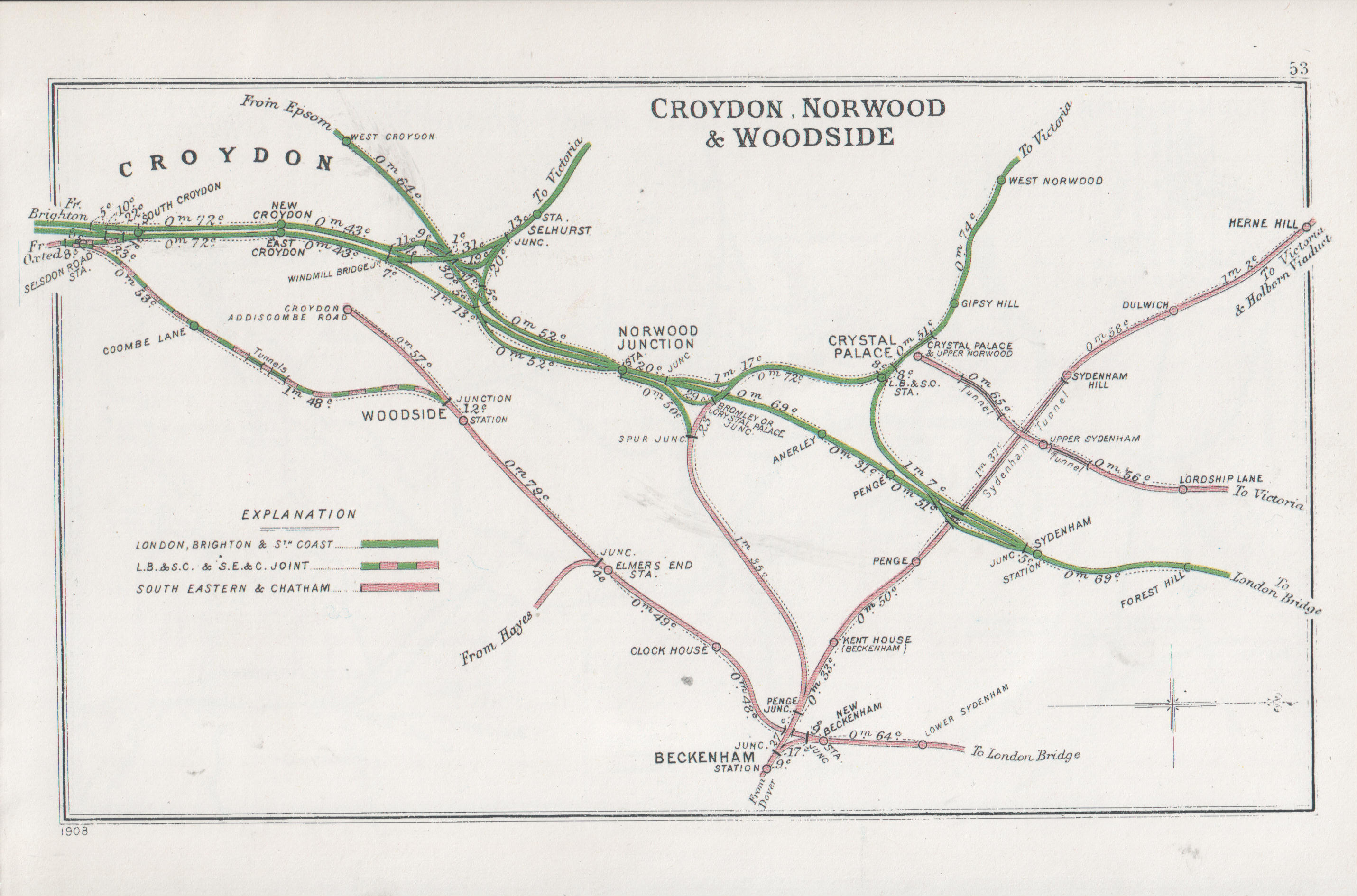
A 1908 Railway Clearing House map of lines around the Woodside and South Croydon Joint Railway.

The Woodside and South Croydon Joint Railway (W&SC) was a short, relatively short-lived and unsuccessful railway in the London Borough of Croydon in London, England. Its site is now largely occupied by Tramlink.

== Route ==
Woodside station

Junction with the Addiscombe branch of the South Eastern Railway. Now Woodside tram stop. Tramlink follows most of the route of the W&SC from here to Coombe Road.

Bingham Road station

The railway was on an embankment here and crossed over Lower Addiscombe Road and Bingham Road on bridges. The embankment has been removed and Tramlink crosses both these roads at grade. The station was just south of Bingham Road. Addiscombe tram stop is between Lower Addiscombe Road and Bingham Road. (Addiscombe railway station was about 500 metres (1,600 ft) to the west - East India Way has been built on its site.) About 200 m (660 ft) east of Sandilands tram stop the Tramlink route from central Croydon divides and both branches follow the route of the W&SC. The northern line takes a sharp turn under Addiscombe Road to join the route of the railway to Woodside, Elmers End and Beckenham Junction. The other line turns southward into the Park Hill tunnels towards Coombe Road and to New Addington.

Coombe Road, originally Coombe Lane

At the site of the station the Tramlink takes a sharp turn east to diverge from the W&SC route, and reaches Lloyd Park tram stop after about 200 m (660 ft). Coombe Lane tram stop is about 2 km (1.2 mi) further east.

Spencer Road Halt

Hidden in an alleyway between Spencer Road and Birdhurst Rise. The railway crossed Croham Road on a bridge, still extant.

Selsdon station, originally Selsdon Road

Junction with the Oxted Line, the former Croydon, Oxted and East Grinstead Railway. Parts of the W&SC platforms are still visible, as is the spur that led to the old goods yard and oil storage depot.

== History ==
=== Opening ===
Woodside and South Croydon Railway Act 1880
- Act of Parliament
- Parliament of the United Kingdom
- Long title: An Act for making a Railway from Woodside to South Croydon, in the county of Surrey; and for other purposes.
- Citation: 43 & 44 Vict. c. cl

Dates
- Royal assent: 6 August 1880

Text of statute as originally enacted

The line was authorised by the Woodside and South Croydon Railway Act 1880 (43 & 44 Vict. c. cl) and built jointly by the London, Brighton and South Coast Railway (LBSCR) and the South Eastern Railway (SER). Although the intention had been to open in 1882, completion was delayed until August 1885 for reasons including bad weather disrupting construction. Success was limited even at the beginning, and following a closure proposal as early as 1895 railmotors were introduced in 1905 in an attempt to improve efficiency and counteract competition from trams and buses. At this time the two halts were opened: although Spencer Road met with little success, Bingham Road attracted more custom with its main-road location and from passengers interchanging with trams and buses; it was rebuilt as a full station (see below).

=== World War I ===
The first closure came in 1917, although services had been suspended for the most part since 1915, to save money and resources for the war effort. It was still possible for diverted trains and excursions or other special services to use the line.

=== Changes in 1935 ===
Major changes came in 1935:

- The line was electrified on the third rail system;
- Bingham Road halt was rebuilt as a full station;
- Coombe Lane was rebuilt and renamed Coombe Road;
- Selsdon Road was renamed Selsdon, although the village of that name was approximately 2 miles (3 km) away;
- The remains of Spencer Road halt were cleared away;
- A new half-hourly service, seven days a week, augmented during weekday peak hours, was introduced - this compares with the previous best service level of 16 trains daily from 1906 until 1915;
- Services ran direct to London at all times, between Sanderstead station and either London Charing Cross or London Cannon Street.

The electric service commenced on 30 September 1935, in belated response to the Southern Heights Light Railway scheme which had received approval in 1928. This had been proposed from Sanderstead to Orpington, and on it would have run a loop service from Charing Cross to Lewisham and then Woodside-Sanderstead-Orpington and back, or vice versa. However, the scheme could not attract investment and was moribund even before the electrification to Sanderstead was completed. So, the decline towards final closure of the Woodside line began soon afterwards.

=== Decline ===
Services were reduced during World War II, with the withdrawal of Saturday afternoon and Sunday trains. In the 1950s through trains to London ran at peak hours only, with a Sanderstead–Elmers End shuttle at other times, connecting with Hayes–London trains). A closure threat came in 1963, but local pressure (through, for example, the newly formed Croydon Transport Users' Association) brought about a reprieve. Saturday trains were withdrawn in 1967. In 1976 through trains to London were withdrawn, leaving a Sanderstead–Elmers End peak hours shuttle service;

=== Closure ===
Closure took place on 13 May 1983: by the time the line closed, estimated usage was less than 200 passengers a day. By 1983 the track was in very poor condition, the Selsdon/Sanderstead area was being planned for re-signalling and in view of the line's low patronage British Rail could not financially justify wholesale renewal. This was a factor in closure.

== 1980 timetable: an illustrative example ==
This table shows the up service three years before closure:

Sanderstead	Selsdon	Coombe Road	Bingham Road	Woodside	Elmers End
Morning Peak
06:45	06:47	06:49	06:51	06:53	06:56
07:15	07:17	07:19	07:21	07:23	07:26
07:32	07:37	07:39	07:41	07:43	07:46
07:53	07:57	07:59	08:01	08:03	08:06
08:14	08:17	08:19	08:21	08:23	08:26
08:32	08:37	08:39	08:41	08:43	08:46
—	08:57	08:59	09:01	09:03	09:06
09:15	09:17	09:19	09:21	09:23	09:26
09:48	09:50	09:52	09:54	09:57	10:00
Evening Peak
16:15	16:17	16:19	16:21	16:23	16:26
16:31	16:37	16:39	16:41	16:43	16:46
16:52	16:57	16:59	17:01	17:03	17:06
17:12	17:17	17:19	17:21	17:23	17:26
—	17:37	17:39	17:41	17:43	17:46
17:55	17:57	17:59	18:01	18:03	18:06
18:15	18:17	18:19	18:21	18:23	18:26
18:37	18:39	18:41	18:43	18:45	18:48
18:50	18:52	—	—	—	18:59
19:15	19:17	19:19	19:22	19:24	19:27

Two trains per day started from and terminated at Selsdon rather than Sanderstead because of the lack of paths on the section shared with the Oxted Line.

== See also ==
- Addiscombe Line
- Coombe, Croydon
- South Croydon
- Sanderstead station
- Sandilands Tunnel
- List of closed railway stations in Britain
