= Elmers End station =

Railway station in London, England

Elmers End
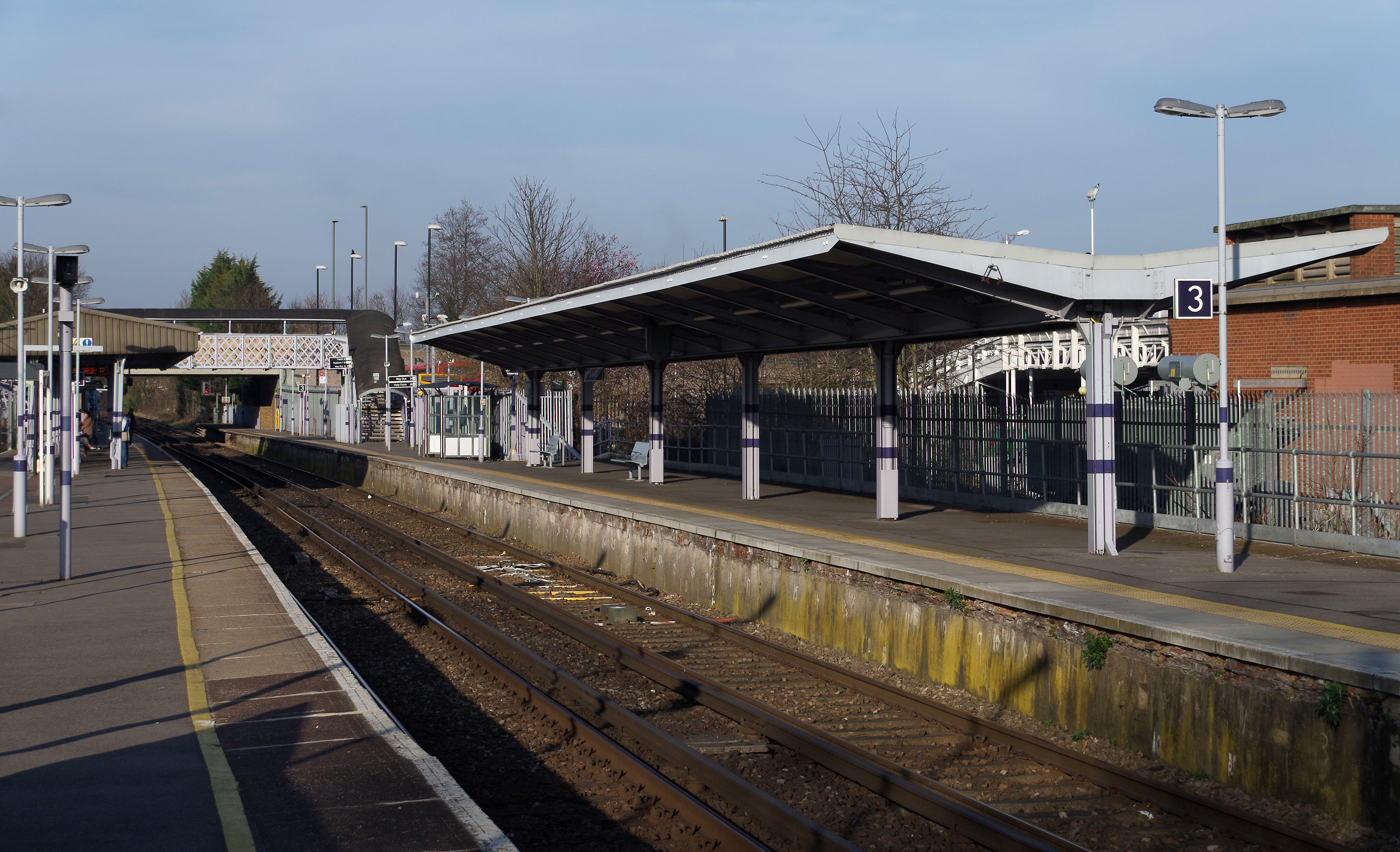
- Interactive map of Elmers End

General information
- Location: Elmers End
- Local authority: Bromley
- Managed by: Southeastern
- Station code: ELE
- DfT category: D
- Number of platforms: 3 (2 for National Rail; 1 for Tramlink)
- Accessible: Yes
- Fare zone: 4

National Rail annual entry and exit
- 2020–21: ▼0.235 million
- 2021–22: ▲0.501 million
- 2022–23: ▲0.616 million
- 2023–24: ▲0.739 million
- 2024–25: ▲0.802 million

Key dates
- 1 April 1864: Opened
- 29 May 1882: Hayes branch opens
- 13 May 1983: Woodside and South Croydon Railway closes
- 31 May 1997: Addiscombe Line closes
- 29 May 2000: Tramlink services began

Other information
- External links: Departures; Facilities
- Coordinates: 51.397778°N 0.049889°W

Elmers End is a railway station and tram terminus in Elmers End, South London, England. It lies in the London Borough of Bromley and is 11 miles 7 chains (17.8 km) down the line from London Charing Cross.

== History ==
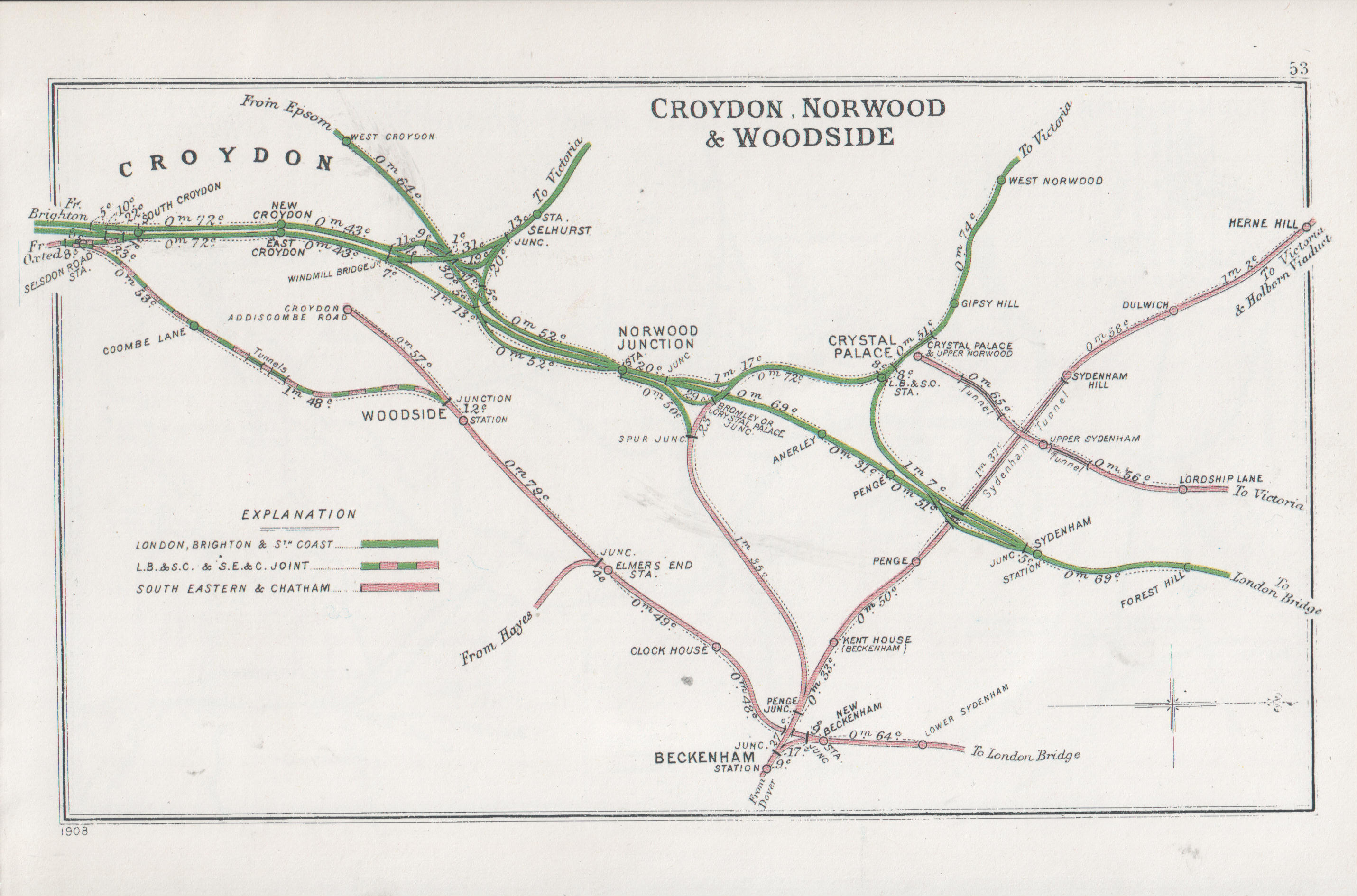
A 1908 Railway Clearing House map of part of the Hayes Line, between Lower Sydenham and Elmers End. It shows the now closed Addiscombe Line and Woodside and South Croydon Railway (W&SCR) branches off the Hayes Line

=== Early years (1857-1922) ===
The Mid Kent line was built by the Mid-Kent and North Kent Junction Railway (MK&NKJR) and was opened on 1 January 1857 as far as Beckenham Junction. From opening, the line was worked by the South Eastern Railway (SER).

Seven years later, the MK&NKJR built an extension from a new junction station at New Beckenham to Croydon (Addiscombe Road). The railway through Elmers End was opened by the SER on 1 April 1864.

The Hayes Line opened on 29 May 1882 to Hayes. The station was occupied in, what was then, a rural area with scattered farm houses and hamlets. The station building was located on the down side whilst a goods yard was provided on the up side.

By 1914, Elmers End had almost become part of Beckenham on the east side of the railway. On the opposite side, a sewage works, the Croydon Council refuse destructor, Beckenham Council's refuse destructor and electric power station as well as two brick works and Crystal Palace District Cemetery were all located. Sidings served the Croydon and Beckenham Council sites.

The station was rebuilt in 1881/2, in anticipation of the opening of the Hayes branch. Bay platforms were provided on the up and down side; a new 43 lever signal box was provided immediately south of the station. New coal sidings, in anticipation of further suburban growth, were also provided on the up side.

The Elmers End – Hayes section was built by the West Wickham & Hayes Railway and left the existing line just south of the station on a tight 13 chain curve. It was sold to the South Eastern Railway in 1881 and opened on 29 May 1882. Initially, 13 services each way were operated between Elmers End and Hayes, with central London passengers having to change trains. (Note: The current Hayes service (2016) which serves the station uses the 1857 line to New Beckenham, the 1864 line to Elmers End and the 1882 line to Hayes.)

In 1898, the South Eastern Railway and its bitter rivals the London Chatham & Dover Railway agreed to work as one railway company under the name of the South Eastern & Chatham Railway and Elmers End became an SECR station.

=== Southern Railway (1923-1947) ===
Following the Railways Act 1921 (also known as the Grouping Act), Elmers End became a Southern Railway station on 1 January 1923.

The Mid-Kent line was electrified with the (750 V DC third rail) system and electric services commenced on 28 February 1926. Early electric services were worked by early Southern Railway three-car electric multiple units, often built from old SECR carriages. In connection with the electrification, the track bed between Elmers End and Clock House area was raised in an effort to reduce flooding. Electrification led to further house building between Clock House and Elmers End stations.

During World War II, the station was hit by bombs three times during 1941. Some track alterations took place in 1947, which included the link between the Up Bay and Hayes line being removed, platform lengthening and direct access from the Hayes branch to the down bay.

=== British Railways (1948-1994) ===
After World War II and following nationalisation on 1 January 1948, the station fell under the auspices of Southern Region of British Railways. Three-aspect colour light signals were installed at the station in 1956.

The goods yard was closed on 6 May 1963. The station building was destroyed by fire on 16 December 1973

On 28 May 1975, all signalling came under the control of the London Bridge Signalling Centre and the 1882 signal box was closed. The down bay was taken out of passenger use and became an engineers' siding, but has since been removed.

Upon sectorisation in 1982, London & South East, renamed Network SouthEast in 1986, operated commuter services in the London area.

Services to Sanderstead ceased in May 1983 with closure of the Woodside and South Croydon Joint Railway.

=== The privatisation era (1994-present day) ===
Following privatisation of British Rail on 1 April 1994, the infrastructure at Elmers End station became the responsibility of Railtrack whilst a business unit operated the train services. On 13 October 1996, operation of the passenger services passed to Connex South Eastern, which was originally due to run the franchise until 2011.

In 1997, the line to Addiscombe closed when Tramlink took over much of the trackbed from Elmers End; up to this point, it was generally worked by a two-car EMU connecting to and from Hayes services. The section to Woodside and part of the former route to Selsdon reopened in 2000 as part of the Croydon Tramlink network.

The Hayes line service on the suburban commuter railway line between Hayes and London Charing Cross through Elmers End is still in use. The station is on Elmers End Road (A214), at the south-east corner of South Norwood Country Park.

One former platform is now the terminus for Tramlink services to central Croydon.

Work is underway to open a second tram platform and double the tram line to Arena to increase capacity. As of March 2019, vegetation has been cleared to make way for the new line. The platform was due to open in December 2020, but as of April 2026 it is still delayed.

== Services ==
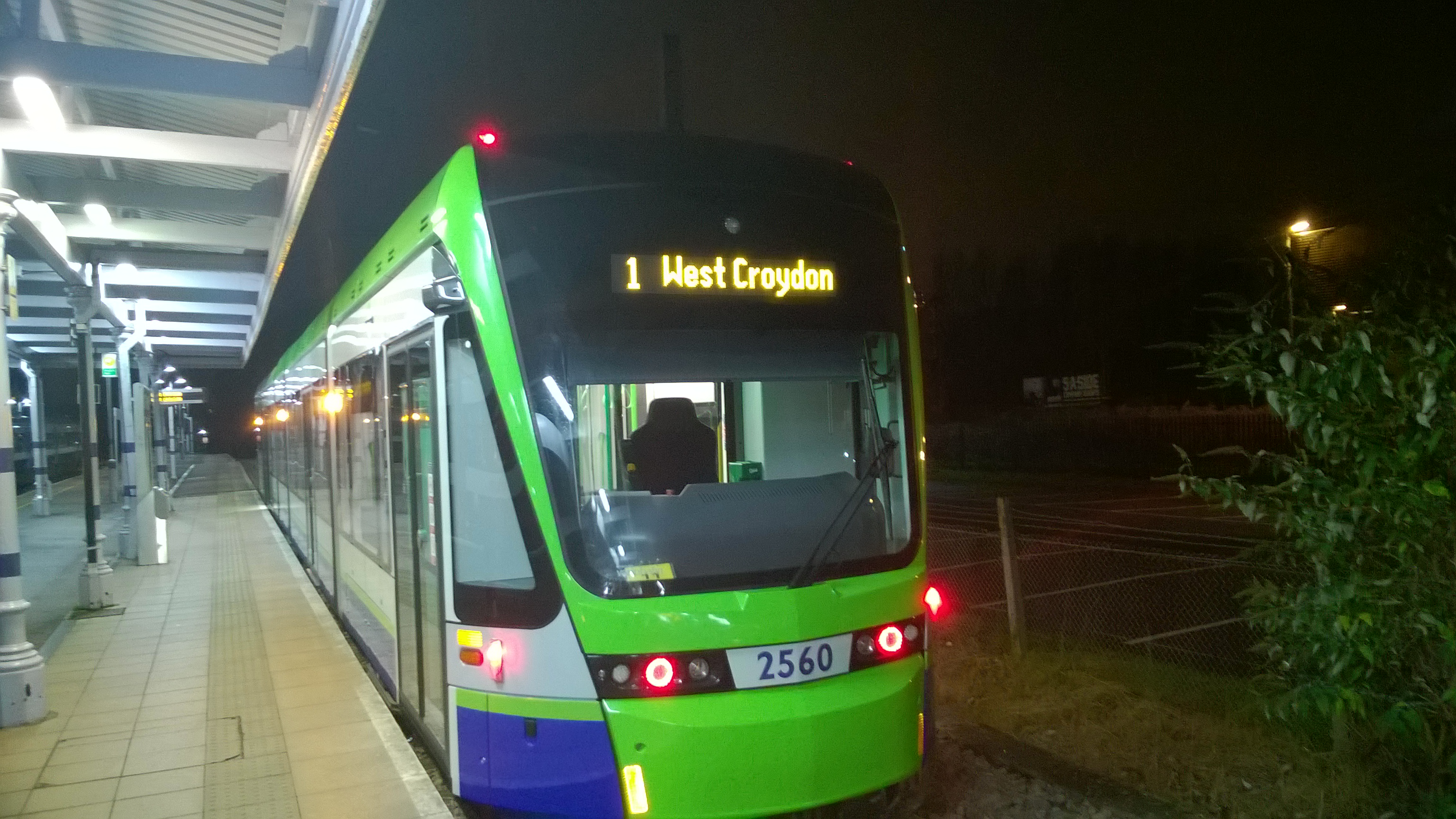
Tramlink Variobahn tram

=== National Rail ===
National Rail services at Elmers End are operated by Southeastern using Class 376, 465, 466 and 707 electric multiple units.

The typical off-peak service in trains per hour is:

- 4 tph to London Charing Cross (2 of these run non-stop between Ladywell and London Bridge and 2 call at Lewisham)
- 4 tph to Hayes

On Sundays, the service is reduced to 2 tph in both directions to Hayes and London Charing Cross via Lewisham.

=== Tramlink ===
The station is served by a tram every 10 minutes to Wimbledon via East Croydon. This is reduced to a tram every 15 minutes on Saturday evenings and Sundays. A small number of early morning and late evening services terminate at Church Street, Therapia Lane or West Croydon.

Services are operated using Bombardier CR4000 and Stadler Variobahn model low-floor trams.

Preceding station	National Rail	Following station
Clock House	Southeastern Hayes Line	Eden Park
Preceding station	Tramlink	Following station
Terminus	Tramlink Wimbledon to Elmers End	Arena (Croydon) towards Wimbledon
	Disused railways	
Terminus	Connex South Eastern Addiscombe Line	Woodside
Terminus	British Rail Southern Region Woodside and South Croydon Railway	Woodside

== Connections ==
London Buses routes 54, 356 and 289 serve the station from the adjacent Elmers End Interchange.

== See also ==
- Addiscombe Line
- Woodside and South Croydon Railway
