= Selsdon railway station =

Former railway station in England

Selsdon
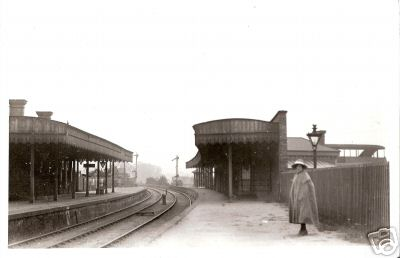
- Interactive map of Selsdon

General information
- Location: Selsdon
- Local authority: London Borough of Croydon
- Grid reference: TQ329637
- Owner: Woodside and South Croydon Joint Railway
- Number of platforms: 4

Key dates
- 10 August 1885: Opened as Selsdon Road
- 1 January 1917: Closed
- 1 May 1919: Reopened
- 30 September 1935: Electrified and renamed Selsdon
- 16 May 1983: Closed

Other information
- Coordinates: 51.3575°N 0.0925°W

Selsdon railway station was at the junction of the Croydon, Oxted and East Grinstead Railway and the now-closed Woodside and South Croydon Joint Railway. Opened in 1885 as Selsdon Road, it was 2 miles (3.2 km) from Selsdon village.

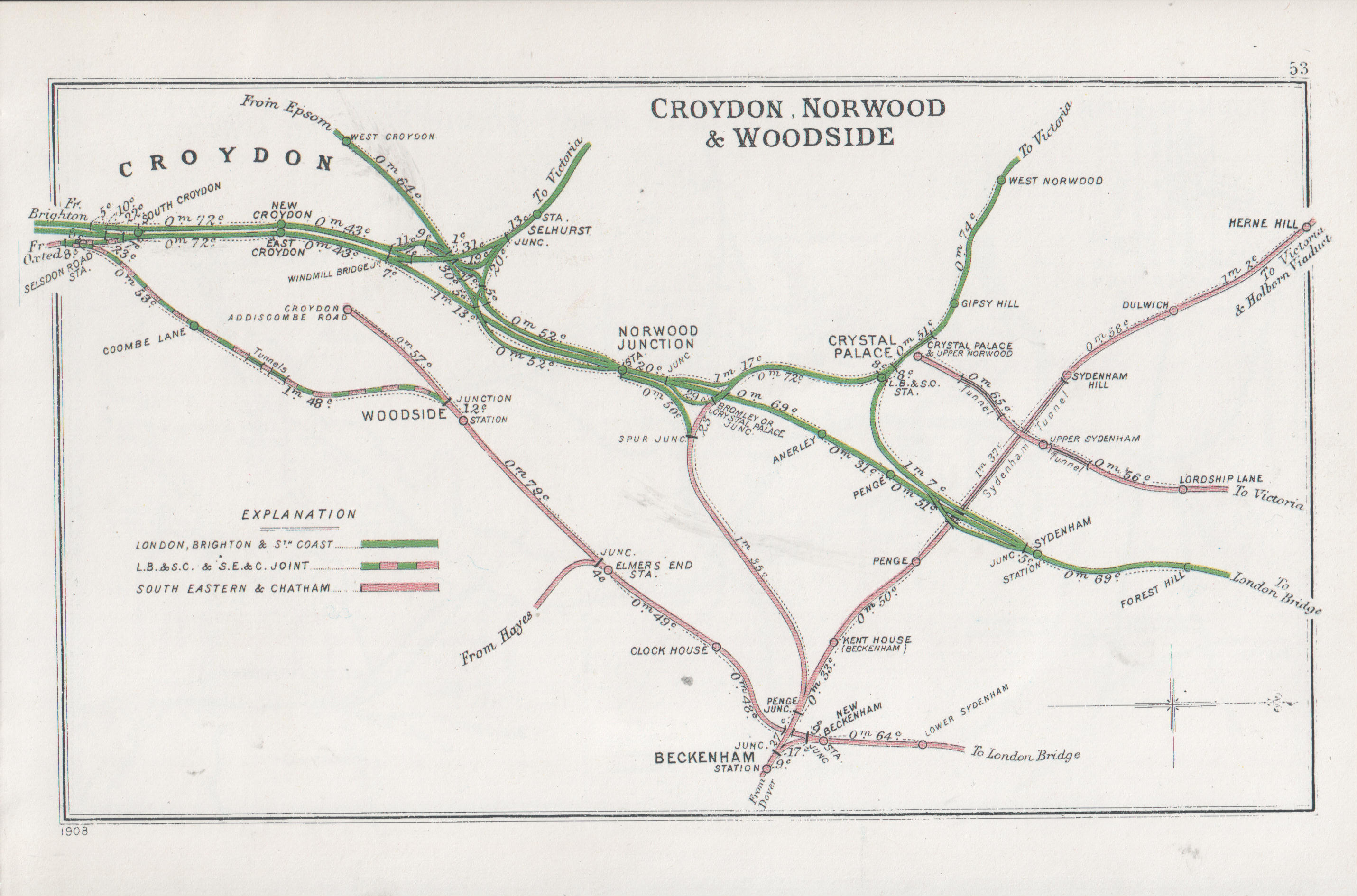
1908 Railway Clearing House map of the Woodside and South Croydon Railway and surrounding lines

== History ==
It was jointly operated by the South Eastern Railway (SER) and the London, Brighton and South Coast Railway (LBSCR) prior to the grouping of railways. The four platforms (two for the Woodside line, two for the Oxted line) were respectively decked out in SER and LBSCR signage and fittings. A subway provided access to the Woodside platforms from the main station building. The station closed as a wartime economy measure on 1 January 1917. The Oxted platforms reopened on 1 May 1919, closing on 14 June 1959. At closure these platforms were used by only three trains a day.

The Woodside line was retained for occasional special services, and reopened with a regular passenger operation upon electrification of the line to Sanderstead on 30 September 1935. The name was also changed that day in an attempt to attract more passengers, who preferred to use the nearby South Croydon, which had a higher frequency of service.

Traffic was controlled by two signalboxes: "Selsdon North" for the Woodside line, with the up line used for reversing some trains; and "Selsdon South" ("Selsdon" after 1935) for the Oxted line. The north box closed on 22 September 1935 following a signalling reorganisation. The south box, with 22 levers, remained in use until 1 April 1984. From 1934 and for many years thereafter, a trailing crossover and a private siding from the up line served a roofing company south of the junction, which received its raw materials by rail.

A goods yard with cattle pens and a chalk pit opened shortly after the station and in 1894 the Anglo-American Oil Company installed oil tanks. The station closed to general freight on 7 October 1968, but the oil tanks remained in use until 1993, accessed from the remnant of the Woodside line to the footbridge, just north of the site of Spencer Road Halt.

Selsdon saw its last passenger train on 13 May 1983 as the Woodside line officially closed three days later. It was the last gas-lit station in London. The station buildings were demolished in the 1960s, leaving a short section of canopy over the subways, and a small wooden hut was erected from where tickets were issued, although latterly this was seldom staffed.

Nowadays some remains of the Oxted platforms and the down Woodside platform are still visible. The heavily overgrown track to the former goods yard and oil storage facility can be seen from Dornton Road footbridge. A building warehouse occupies the up Woodside platform and the main station buildings.

Preceding station	Disused railways	Following station
Spencer Road Halt	Southern Region; Woodside and South Croydon Railway	Sanderstead
South Croydon	Southern Region; Croydon and Oxted Joint Railway	Sanderstead
