= Bandon Halt railway station =

Disused railway station in England

Bandon Halt
- Interactive map of Bandon Halt

General information
- Location: London Borough of Sutton
- Owner: London, Brighton & South Coast Railway
- Number of platforms: 2

Key dates
- 11 June 1906: Opened
- 7 June 1914: Closed

Other information
- Coordinates: 51.36377°N 0.13264°W

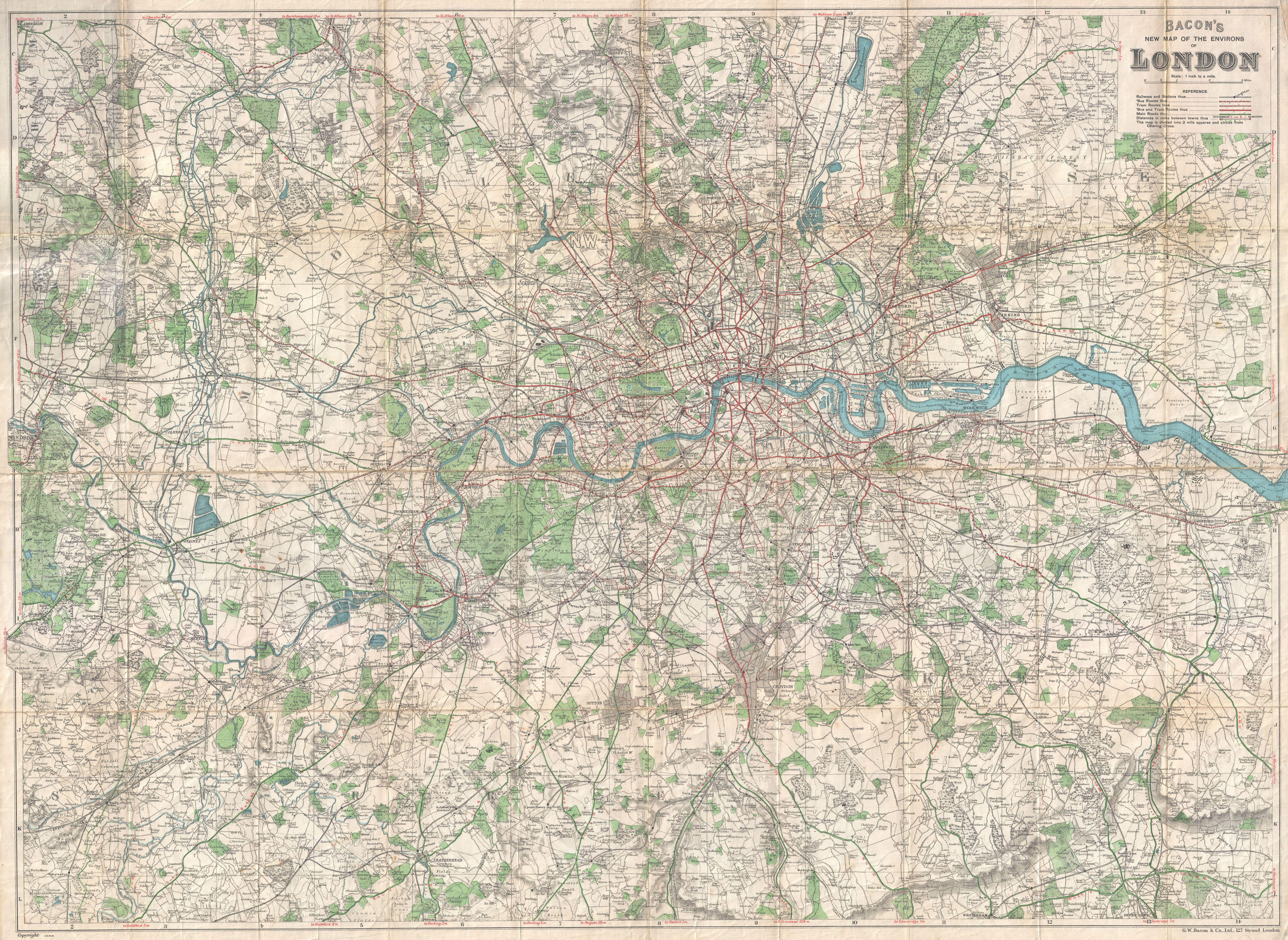
Extract from Bacon Pocket Map of London (1920)

Bandon Halt was a station on the 1847 London, Brighton and South Coast Railway extension from West Croydon to Epsom. It was between Waddon and Wallington stations in Beddington in what is now the London Borough of Sutton, and opened on 11 June 1906 and closed 7 June 1914. It takes its name from the rise mostly to the east Bandon Hill. It was accessed from Plough Lane, the platforms lying to the immediate west of the overbridge.

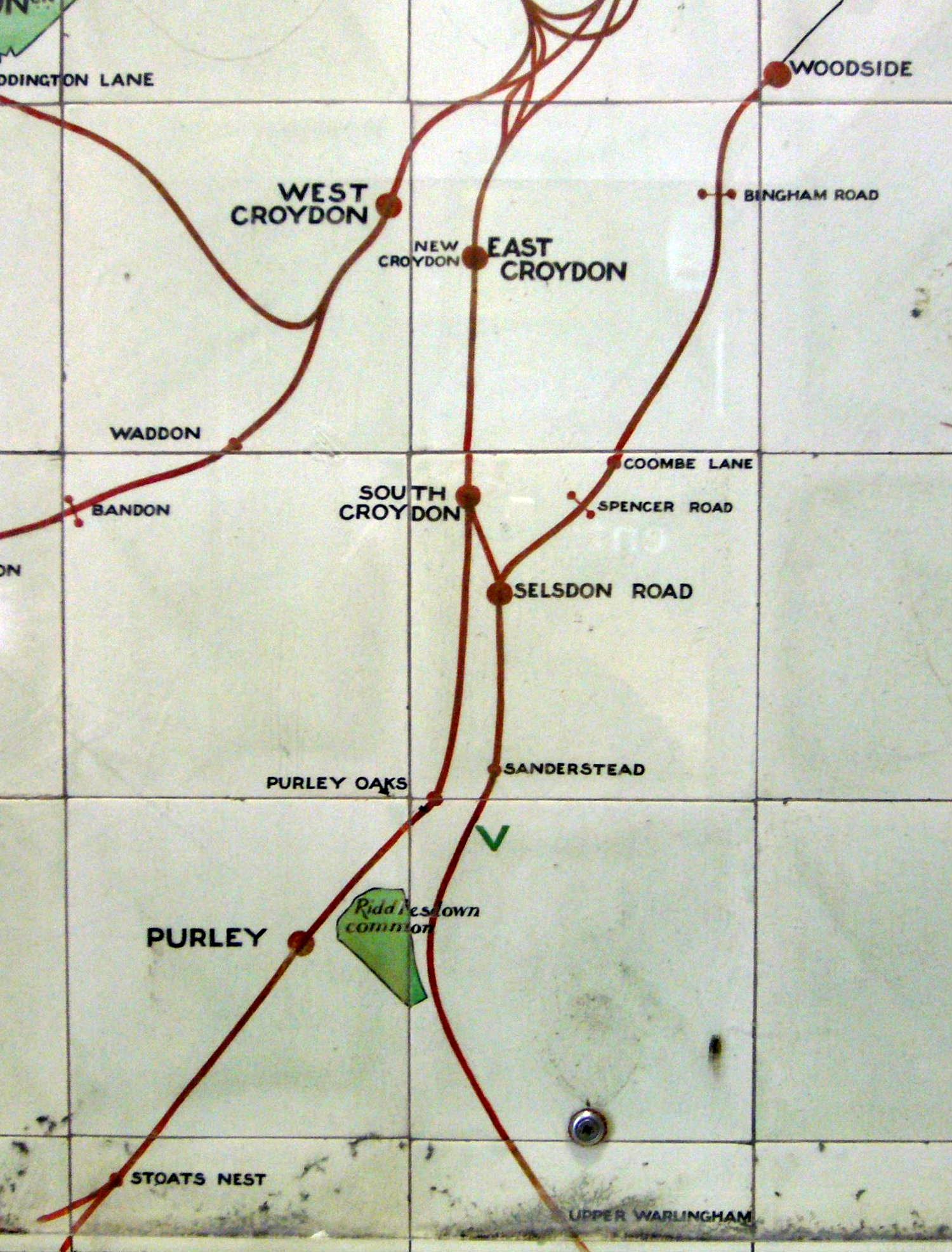
Contemporary map of railways including stations, locally
