= West Wickham railway station =

National Rail station in London, England

West Wickham
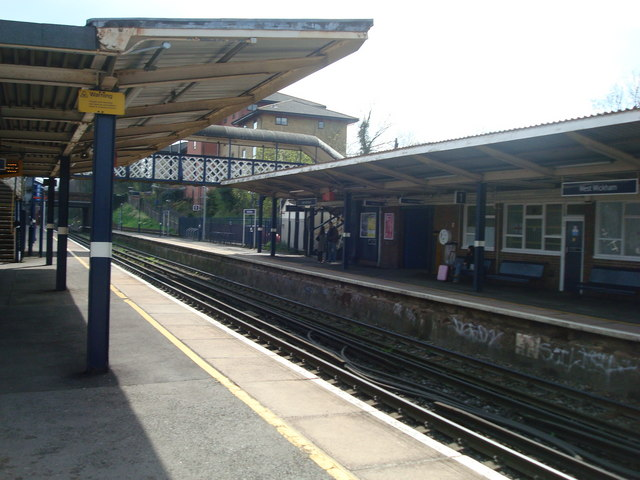
- Interactive map of West Wickham

General information
- Location: West Wickham
- Local authority: London Borough of Bromley
- Managed by: Southeastern
- Station code: WWI
- DfT category: D
- Number of platforms: 2
- Accessible: Yes
- Fare zone: 5

National Rail annual entry and exit
- 2020–21: ▼0.158 million
- 2021–22: ▲0.457 million
- 2022–23: ▲0.604 million
- 2023–24: ▲0.721 million
- 2024–25: ▲0.793 million

Key dates
- 29 May 1882: Opened

Other information
- External links: Departures; Facilities
- Coordinates: 51.3813°N 0.0145°W

West Wickham railway station serves the area of West Wickham, in the London Borough of Bromley, south London, England. It is a stop on the Hayes line, 13 miles 19 chains (21.3 km) down the line from London Charing Cross and in London fare zone 5. The station is managed by Southeastern, which also operates all services.

== History ==
=== Early years (1882–1923) ===
West Wickham station was opened on 29 May 1882, when the branch from the Mid-Kent Railway at Elmers End to Hayes.

The branch was built by the West Wickham & Hayes Railway, but was sold to the South Eastern Railway in 1881 for £162,000. Colonel John Farnaby, Lord of the Manor of West Wickham, was a leading promoter. Initially, the 13 weekday and four Sunday services operated as far as Elmers End where they connected with Addiscombe to London trains. West Wickham was the second station located on the branch located a quarter of a mile north of Wickham Green (963 inhabitants).

On opening, the station was provided with two platforms and the station building was located on the up side. The station building was built in the SER clapboard style, with a slate roof; a goods yard was provided at the London end on the down side. On the opposite side of the line, a signal box was provided at the east (London) end of the station. The station was also provided with two end loading docks, which would have been used for the horse-drawn carriages of the gentry.

Initially, the line was of questionable commercial value as the area was largely rural; however, it was an attractive location for Londoners wishing to escape to the countryside and, with this in mind, The Railway Hotel was opened in 1882.

In 1898, the South Eastern Railway and the London Chatham and Dover Railway agreed to work as one railway company under the name of the South Eastern and Chatham Railway and thus West Wickham became a SE&CR station.

By 1912, services had increased to 15 each way, but only two of these actually operated through to London; the rest terminated at Elmers End.

=== Southern Railway (1923–1947) ===
Following the Railways Act 1921 (also known as the Grouping Act), West Wickham became a Southern Railway station on 1 January 1923.

The line was electrified with limited electric services commencing on 21 September 1925, before a full electric service started operation on 28 February 1926. Following the electrification, house building started to increase in the area and so did patronage of the station. In 1925, 336 season tickets were sold but nine years later this had increased to 18,711. Similarly, 46,985 tickets were issued in 1925 but, in 1934, that had risen to 251,024 tickets per year.

On 10 May 1941, during the Second World War, a German bomb exploded between the two platforms severely damaging the SER structures.

=== British Railways (1948–1994) ===
On 1 January 1948, following nationalisation of the railways, West Wickham became part of British Railways' Southern Region. Seventeen years after the original buildings had been damaged by the bomb, new brick buildings and platform canopies were provided. Prior to the war in 1935, West Wickham had been the busiest station on the branch but Hayes became busier in the 1950s. The goods yard continued to be busy throughout the 1950s, with 11,000 tons of solid fuel being recorded in 1958. The goods yard was closed on 2 September 1963.

In connection with the introduction of colour light signalling on the branch, the signal box was closed on 27 September 1975; the signals are now controlled from London Bridge Signalling Centre.

Upon sectorisation in 1982, London & South East operated commuter services in the London area; it was renamed Network SouthEast in 1986.

=== The privatisation era (1994–present day) ===
Following privatisation of British Rail on 1 April 1994, the infrastructure at West Wickham station became the responsibility of Railtrack whilst a business unit operated the train services. On 13 October 1996, operation of the passenger services passed to Connex South Eastern.

== Service ==
All services at West Wickham are operated by Southeastern using Class 376, 465, 466 and 707 electric multiple units.

The typical off-peak service in trains per hour is:

- 4 tph to London Charing Cross (2 of these run non-stop between Ladywell and London Bridge and 2 call at Lewisham)
- 4 tph to Hayes

On Sundays, the station is served by a half-hourly service between Hayes and London Charing Cross via Lewisham.

Preceding station	National Rail	Following station
Eden Park	Southeastern Hayes Line	Hayes

== Connections ==
London Buses routes 194 and 352 serve the station.
