= Lower Sydenham railway station =

National Rail station in London, England

Lower Sydenham
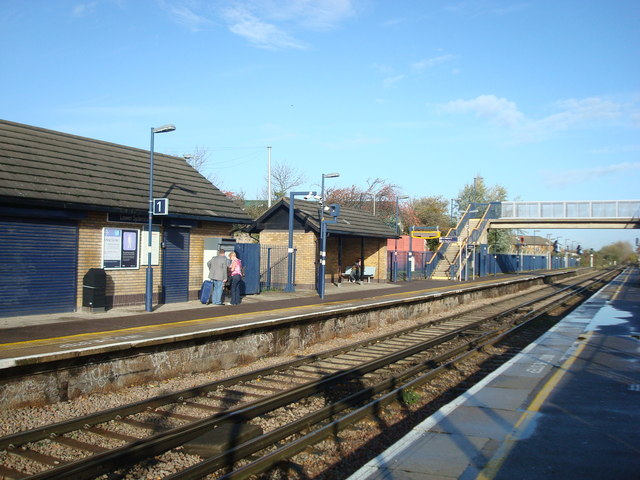
- Interactive map of Lower Sydenham

General information
- Location: Lower Sydenham
- Local authority: Lewisham
- Managed by: Southeastern
- Station code: LSY
- DfT category: E
- Number of platforms: 2
- Accessible: Yes
- Fare zone: 4

National Rail annual entry and exit
- 2020–21: ▼0.210 million
- 2021–22: ▲0.454 million
- 2022–23: ▲0.562 million
- 2023–24: ▲0.705 million
- 2024–25: ▲0.787 million

Railway companies
- Original company: Mid-Kent Railway
- Pre-grouping: South Eastern and Chatham Railway
- Post-grouping: Southern Railway

Key dates
- 1 January 1857: Opened
- 1906: Resited 100m south

Other information
- External links: Departures; Facilities
- Coordinates: 51.4245°N 0.0336°W

Lower Sydenham railway station is located on the boundary of the London Borough of Bromley and the London Borough of Lewisham, in south-east London, England. It lies 9 miles 2 chains (14.5 km) from London Charing Cross.

The station serves the localities of Lower Sydenham and Southend. Served and managed by Southeastern, it is a stop on the Hayes Line as part of its Metro routes.

== History ==
=== Early years (1857–1922) ===
The Mid Kent line was built by the Mid-Kent and North Kent Junction Railway (MK&NKJR) and was opened on 1 January 1857 as far as Beckenham Junction (although it was not technically a junction as the West End of London and Crystal Palace Railway's line did not open until 3 May 1858).

From opening, the line was worked by the South Eastern Railway (SER). On opening, Lower Sydenham was provided with a small goods yard.

Seven years later, the MK&NKJR built an extension from a new junction station at New Beckenham to Croydon (Addiscombe Road) which again was operated by the SER. In 1878, a connection was added a quarter-mile north of the station to serve the Crystal Palace District Gas Company, which had been established on the site in 1854.

Almost all services from the station have terminated at Charing Cross or Cannon Street stations; however, between 1880 and 1884, a service worked between Croydon (Addiscombe Road) calling all stations to New Cross and then via a connection to the East London Line and terminating at Liverpool Street station.

In the 1890s, housing was developed to the north and west of the station.

In 1898, the South Eastern Railway and its bitter rivals the London Chatham and Dover Railway agreed to work as one railway company under the name of the South Eastern and Chatham Railway; Lower Sydenham became an SECR station.

In 1906, the station was moved 100 yards south in an effort to develop a new area for housing.

By 1912, the gasworks were now owned by the South Suburban Gas Company and had three steam locomotives operating on three miles of track.

=== Southern Railway (1923–1947) ===
Following the Railways Act 1921 Lower Sydenham became a Southern Railway station on 1 January 1923.

The Mid-Kent line was electrified with the (750 V DC third rail) system; electric services commenced on 28 February 1926 and were first worked by early Southern Railway three-car electric multiple units, often built from old SECR carriages. Electrification saw more houses built in the Lower Sydenham area, which also picked up some passengers from the large London County Council estate at Bellingham.

=== British Railways (1948–1994) ===
After World War II and following nationalisation on 1 January 1948, the station fell under the auspices of British Railways' Southern Region.

In the 1950s, the line was still busy with freight traffic with four early morning seaborne coal trains routed from Erith to Brockley Lane (reverse) and then to the gas works. In addition, there were trains from Bricklayers Arms that served the various goods yards (including Lower Sydenham) along the line.

The goods yard closed to general traffic on 28 December 1964 and to coal on 25 March 1968. The change from coal generated gas to North Sea gas saw rail traffic to the gas works cease on 22 April 1969, with the connection being removed as part of the 1971 resignalling.

Colour light signalling was introduced between Ladywell and New Beckenham on 4 April 1971, with signalling being controlled by the signal box at New Beckenham. The original SER signal box closed as a result.

In 1972, the timber structure was replaced by a modern CLASP type structure.

On 28 September 1975, control of the signalling was transferred to London Bridge signalling centre.

Upon sectorisation in 1982, London & South East (later renamed Network SouthEast in 1986) operated commuter services in the London area.

The station building was burned down in 1989 and a newer structure was provided by Network SouthEast in 1991.

=== The privatisation era (1994–present) ===
Following privatisation of British Rail on 1 April 1994, the infrastructure at Lower Sydenham station became the responsibility of Railtrack, whilst a business unit operated the train services. On 13 October 1996, operation of the passenger services passed to Connex South Eastern, which were originally due to run the franchise until 2011.

== Facilities ==
The station has step free access to both platforms with entrances on both sides; however, the two footbridges have no lifts.

Platform 1 has a ticket office and a ticket machine. Both platforms have brick built shelters and can fit ten-carriage trains. The station's main building was rebuilt in the 1990s following an arson attack.

== Services ==
All services at Lower Sydenham are operated by Southeastern using Class 376, 465, 466 and 707 electric multiple units.

The typical off-peak service in trains per hour is:

- 4 tph to London Charing Cross (2 of these run non-stop between Ladywell and London Bridge and 2 call at Lewisham)
- 4 tph to Hayes

On Sundays, the station is served by a half-hourly service between Hayes and London Charing Cross, via Lewisham.

Preceding station	National Rail	Following station
Catford Bridge	Southeastern Hayes Line	New Beckenham

== Connections ==
London Buses route 352 serves the station.
