= Eden Park railway station =

National Rail station in London, England

Eden Park
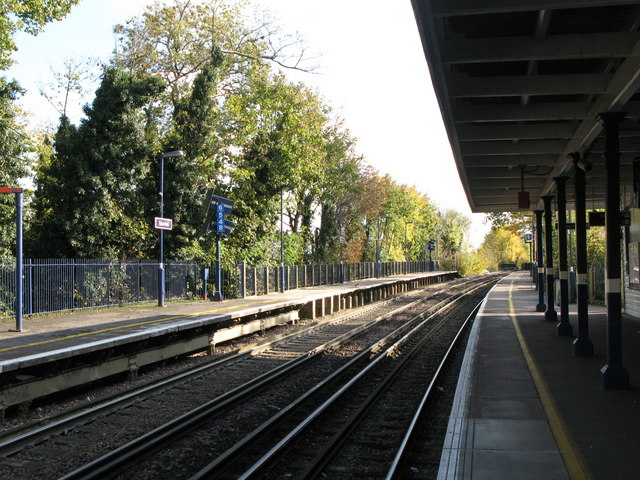
- Interactive map of Eden Park

General information
- Location: Eden Park
- Local authority: Bromley
- Managed by: Southeastern
- Station code: EDN
- DfT category: E
- Number of platforms: 2
- Fare zone: 5

National Rail annual entry and exit
- 2020–21: ▼0.122 million
- 2021–22: ▲0.330 million
- 2022–23: ▲0.418 million
- 2023–24: ▲0.521 million
- 2024–25: ▲0.559 million

Key dates
- 29 May 1882: Opened

Other information
- External links: Departures; Facilities
- Coordinates: 51.39°N 0.0262°W

Eden Park railway station serves Eden Park, in the London Borough of Bromley, south-east London, England. It lies 12 miles 34 chains (20.0 km) down the line from London Charing Cross, in London fare zone 5. The station and all trains serving it are operated by Southeastern on the Hayes line.

Opened in 1882 by the South Eastern Railway, it is the first station along the branch line from Elmers End to Hayes and still has most of its original wooden buildings, surviving an arson attempt by the suffragettes in 1913 and a partial rebuilding in 1922.

== History ==
=== Early years (1882–1923) ===
Eden Park was built by the West Wickham & Hayes Railway, at the same time as the branch from the Mid-Kent Railway at Elmers End to Hayes; it was opened on 29 May 1882.

The branch was sold to the South Eastern Railway in 1881 for £162,000. Colonel John Farnaby, Lord of the Manor of West Wickham, was a leading promoter. Initially the 13 weekday and four Sunday services operated as far as Elmers End, where they connected with Addiscombe to London trains. Eden Park was the first station located on the branch and from opening was provided with two platforms. The station building was (and is) built in the SER clapboard style with a slate roof and is located on the down side with a small shelter being located on the up. The station was named Eden Park after the estate of William R Mace, who had insisted the station be provided on condition for use of his land. A signal box was provided at the Hayes end of the station .

Initially the line was of questionable commercial value, as the area was largely rural, although it was an attractive location for Londoners wishing to escape to the countryside.

In 1898, the South Eastern Railway and the London Chatham and Dover Railway agreed to work as one railway company under the name of the South Eastern and Chatham Railway and thus Eden Park became a SE&CR station.

The signal box was closed in 1899.

By 1912, services had increased to 15 each way but only two of these actually operated through to London; the rest terminated at Elmers End.

On 14 June 1913, members of the Suffragettes movement planted a bomb which was discovered in the ladies waiting room at the station. The clockwork mechanism had stopped working and so it failed to go off. This event followed the death of Emily Wilding Davison six days earlier, after her attempt to stop the King's horse at the Epsom Derby.

=== Southern Railway (1923–1947) ===
Following the Railways Act 1921 (also known as the Grouping Act), Eden Park became a Southern Railway station on 1 January 1923.

The line was electrified, with limited electric services commencing on 21 September 1925 before a full service started operation on 28 February 1926. Following the electrification house building started to increase in the area and as a result so did patronage of the station. In 1925, 61 season tickets were sold but this had increased to 4,188 nine years later. Similarly, 7,000 tickets were issued in 1925 but in 1934 that had risen to 75,000 tickets per year. Between 1929 and 1930, a trailing siding from the up line on the east side of the station was in use in conjunction with the construction of the Monks Orchard (Bethlem Royal) Hospital in Shirley.

=== British Railways (1948–1994) ===
On 1 January 1948, following nationalisation of the railways, Eden Park became part of British Railways' Southern Region.

Upon sectorisation in 1982, London & South East operated commuter services in the London area; it was renamed Network SouthEast in 1986.

=== Privatisation era (1994–present) ===
Following privatisation of British Rail on 1 April 1994, the infrastructure at Eden Park station became the responsibility of Railtrack whilst a business unit operated the train services. On 13 October 1996 operation of the passenger services passed to Connex South Eastern.

On 30 November 2005, the Department for Transport awarded Govia the Integrated Kent franchise. The services operated by South Eastern Trains transferred to Southeastern on 1 April 2006.

A blind man fell from the platform and was killed by a train on 26 February 2020; a February 2021 report by the Rail Accident Investigation Branch attributed his death to tactile paving not having been installed at the platform edge.

== Services ==
All services at Eden Park are operated by Southeastern using Class 376, 465, 466 and 707 electric multiple units.

The typical off-peak service in trains per hour is:

- 4 tph to London Charing Cross (2 of these run non-stop between Ladywell and London Bridge and 2 call at Lewisham)
- 4 tph to Hayes

On Sundays, the station is served by a half-hourly service between Hayes and London Charing Cross, via Lewisham.

Preceding station	National Rail	Following station
Elmers End	Southeastern Hayes Line	West Wickham

== Connections ==
London Buses routes 194, 356 and 358 serve the station. London Superloop route SL5 stops a short while away on South Eden Park Road.
