= Catford Bridge railway station =

National Rail station in London, England

Catford Bridge
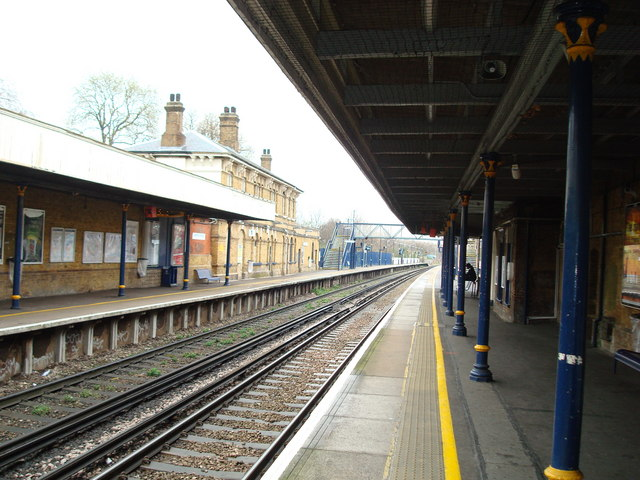
- Interactive map of Catford Bridge

General information
- Location: Catford
- Local authority: London Borough of Lewisham
- Managed by: Southeastern
- Station code: CFB
- DfT category: D
- Number of platforms: 2
- Accessible: Yes
- Fare zone: 3
- OSI: Catford

National Rail annual entry and exit
- 2020–21: ▼0.696 million
- Interchange: ▼12,610
- 2021–22: ▲1.452 million
- Interchange: ▲35,641
- 2022–23: ▲1.833 million
- Interchange: ▲53,974
- 2023–24: ▲2.357 million
- Interchange: ▲63,357
- 2024–25: ▲2.512 million
- Interchange: ▲82,277

Key dates
- 1 January 1857: Opened

Other information
- External links: Departures; Facilities
- Coordinates: 51.4446°N 0.025°W

Catford Bridge railway station is on the Mid-Kent Line, serving Hayes line trains from London to Hayes. It lies between Ladywell and Lower Sydenham stations, 7 miles 42 chains (12.1 km) from London Charing Cross and in London fare zone 3. It is adjacent to (and on a lower level than) Catford railway station (from which it is separated by the former Catford Stadium site) on the Catford loop line. The station entrance is on Catford Road, a part of the South Circular Road (A205), and has brick buildings on both platforms, though the up side building is no longer in use by the railway. The station is managed by Southeastern, who operate all trains serving it.

== History ==
=== Early years (1857–1922) ===
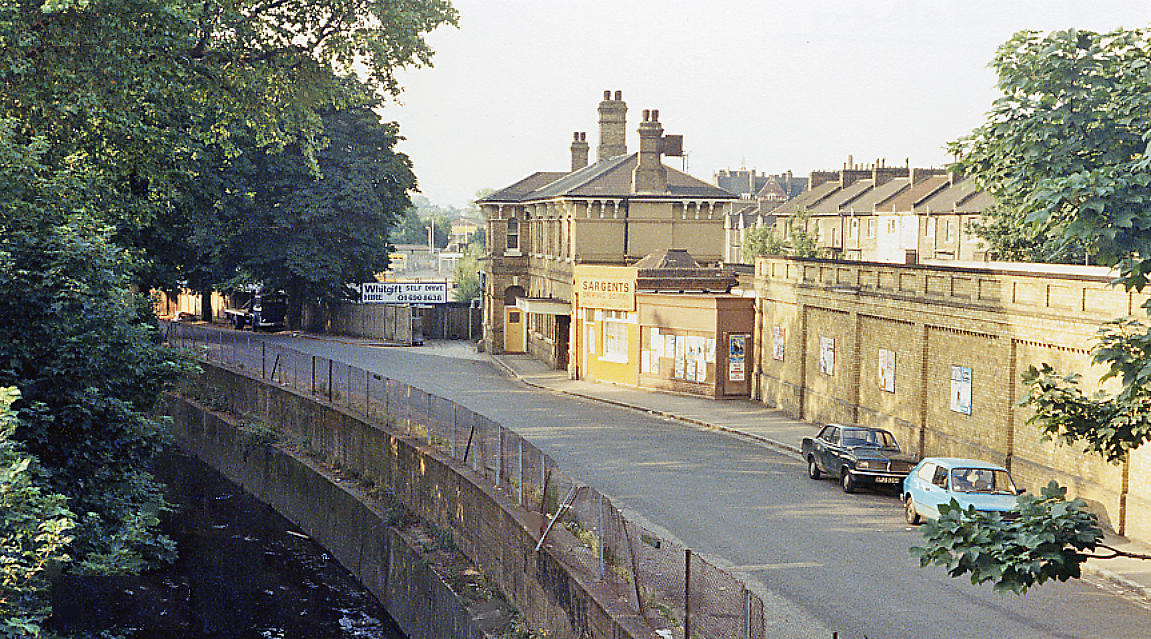
Station approach (1983)

The Mid Kent line was built by the Mid-Kent and North Kent Junction Railway (MK&NKJR) and was opened on 1 January 1857 as far as Beckenham Junction (although it was not technically a junction as the West End of London and Crystal Palace Railway's line did not open until 3 May 1858).

From opening the line was worked by the South Eastern Railway (SER). On opening Catford Bridge was provided with a small goods yard on the up side north of the platform. (Note: The provision of the goods yard is stated as "in the 20th Century" by Vic Mitchell and Keith Smith in their book London Bridge to Addiscombe.)

Seven years later the MK&NKJR built an extension from a new junction station at New Beckenham to Croydon (Addiscombe Road) which again was operated by the SER.

Almost all services from the station have terminated at Charing Cross or Cannon Street stations but between 1880 and 1884 a service worked between Croydon (Addiscombe Road) calling all stations to New Cross and then via a connection to the East London Line and terminating at Liverpool Street station.

In 1898 the South Eastern Railway and its bitter rivals the London Chatham and Dover Railway agreed to work as one railway company under the name of the South Eastern and Chatham Railway and Catford Bridge became an SECR station.

=== Southern Railway (1923–1947) ===
Following the Railways Act 1921 (also known as the Grouping Act), Catford Bridge became a Southern Railway station on 1 January 1923.

The Mid-Kent line was electrified with the (750 V DC) third rail system and electric services commenced on 28 February 1926. Early electric services were worked by early Southern Railway 3-car Electric Multiple Unit trains often built from old SECR carriages.

Between 1927 and 1935 speculative house building west of the station saw an increase in commuter numbers.

=== British Railways (1948–1994) ===
After World War II and following nationalisation on 1 January 1948, the station fell under the control of British Railways Southern Region.

The goods yard closed to general traffic on 28 December 1964 and to coal on 25 March 1968. Colour light signalling was introduced between Ladywell and New Beckenham on 4 April 1971 with signalling being controlled by the signal box at New Beckenham. The small SER signal box which was located on the up platform was closed as a result. On 28 September 1975 the control of the signalling was transferred to London Bridge signalling centre.

In May 1993, the ticket office on the "up" side towards London was destroyed by a fire, causing the ticket office on the "down" side of the station to reopen after being closed in the 1960s.

=== The privatisation era (1994–present day) ===
On 13 October 1996 operation of the passenger services passed to Connex South Eastern. Services were subsequently operated by South Eastern Trains, and Southeastern since 1 April 2006.

== Services ==
All services at Catford Bridge are operated by Southeastern using Class 376, 465, 466 and 707 EMUs.

The typical off-peak service in trains per hour is:

- 4 tph to London Charing Cross (2 of these run non-stop between Ladywell and London Bridge and 2 call at Lewisham)
- 4 tph to Hayes

On Sundays, the station is served by a half-hourly service between Hayes and London Charing Cross via Lewisham.

Preceding station	National Rail	Following station
Ladywell	Southeastern Hayes Line	Lower Sydenham

== Connections ==
London Buses routes 75, 124, 160, 171, 181, 185, 202, 284, 320, 336 and night route N171 serve the station.
