= Eden Park, London =

Coordinates: 51.3884°N 0.0243°W

Eden Park
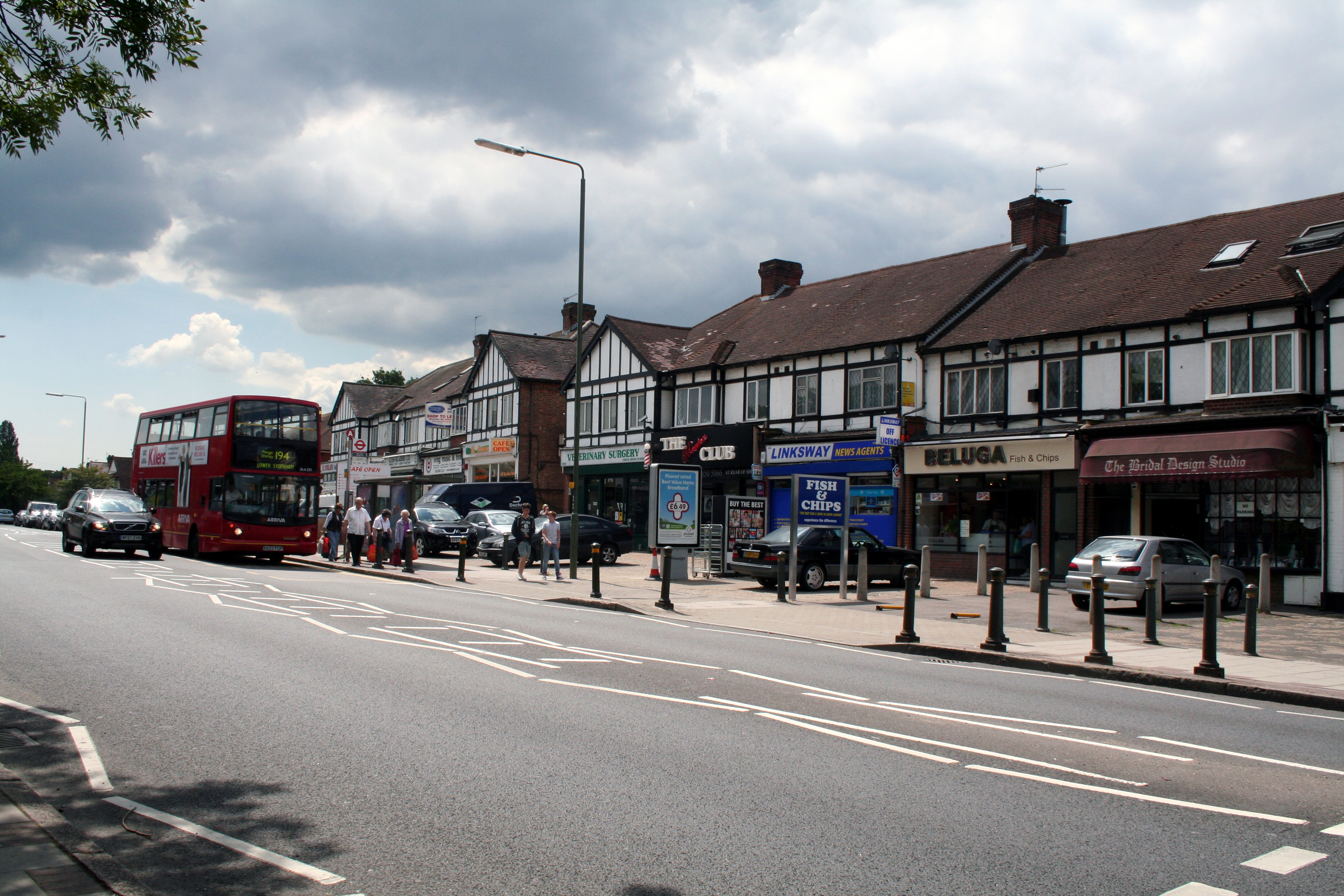
- Shops alongside Upper Elmers End Road in Eden Park

- Location within Greater London
- Population: 15,892 (2011 Census.Kelsey and Eden Park Ward)
- OS grid reference: TQ373675
- London borough: Bromley
- Ceremonial county: Greater London
- Region: London
- Country: England
- Sovereign state: United Kingdom
- Post town: BECKENHAM
- Postcode district: BR3
- Dialling code: 020
- Police: Metropolitan
- Fire: London
- Ambulance: London
- UK Parliament: Beckenham & Penge
- London Assembly: Bexley and Bromley

Eden Park is a suburban area in Greater London, England, within the London Borough of Bromley, Greater London and prior to 1965, in the historic county of Kent. It lies south of Beckenham, west of Park Langley and Shortlands, north of West Wickham and Monks Orchard and east of Elmers End.

== History ==
The area was traditionally rural; William Eden leased land here in the 1780s and developed the area as farmland. Large mansions began to be constructed in the area in the 19th century, increasing after the opening of Eden Park station in 1882 and then especially rapidly after the First World War. Many of the older mansions were destroyed and replaced with the suburban housing that now characterises the area.

From 1994 to 2004 the area was home to a large skating park; this was closed by Bromley Council following complaints about noise.

== Governance ==
Eden Park is part of the Kelsey and Eden Park ward for elections to Bromley London Borough Council.

== Amenities ==
The area contains a row of shops by the railway station, and another row in the area formerly known as Upper Elmers End, as well as a few restaurants including a Toby Carvery pub, built in 1936 as a hotel.

The main parks in the area are Crease Park, named after local Alderman James Crease and opened in July 1936, Stanhope Recreation Ground on Stanhope Grove and Harvington Sports Ground (also known as Harvington Estate) on Eden Park Avenue.

== Transport ==
Eden Park railway station serves the area with services to London Charing Cross and Hayes. Eden Park is served by three Transport for London buses. The 194 to Lower Sydenham via Beckenham and to West Croydon via Shirley, the 356 to Upper Sydenham via Elmers End and to Shirley, the 358 to Crystal Palace via Beckenham and to Orpington via Bromley, and the SL5 to Bromley North and to Croydon.

== Education ==
- Langley Park Primary School
- Langley Park School for Boys
- Langley Park School for Girls
- Marian Vian Primary School
- Unicorn Primary School

== Sports ==
- The Parklangley Club
- Club Langley
- Beckenham Town Football Club

== Gallery ==
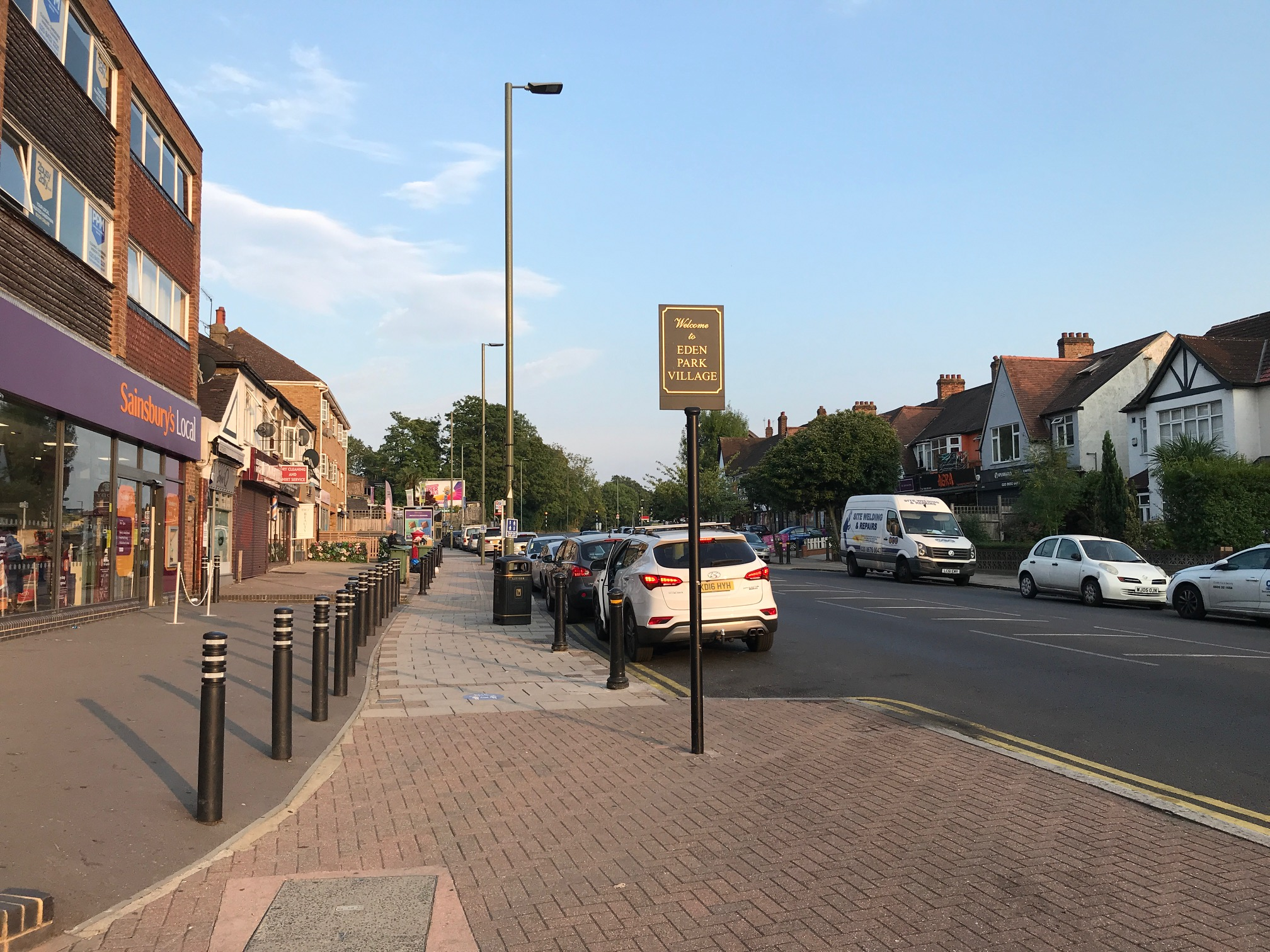
The main parade of shops by the train station, looking east

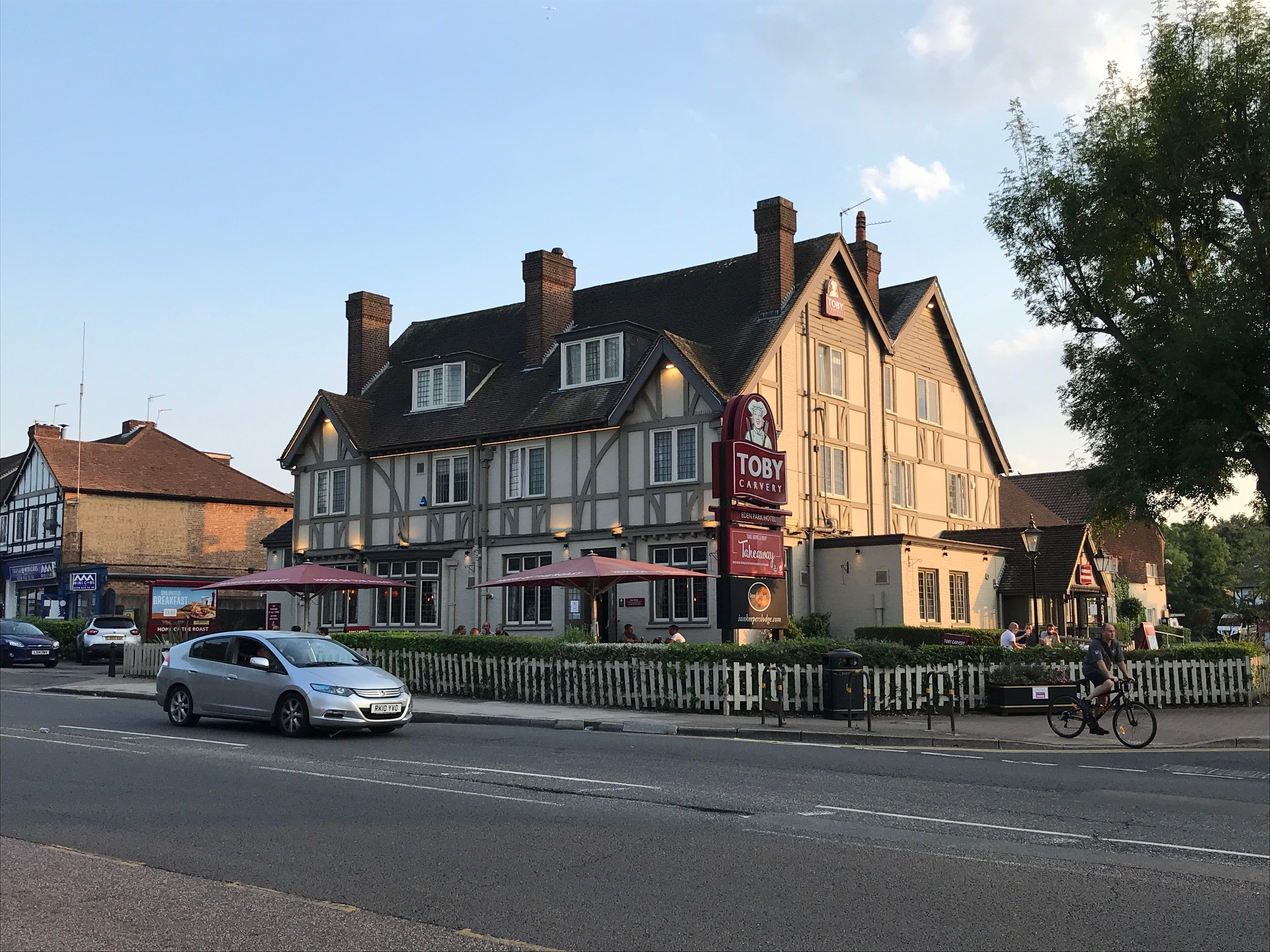
Toby Carvery pub, formerly the Eden Park Hotel

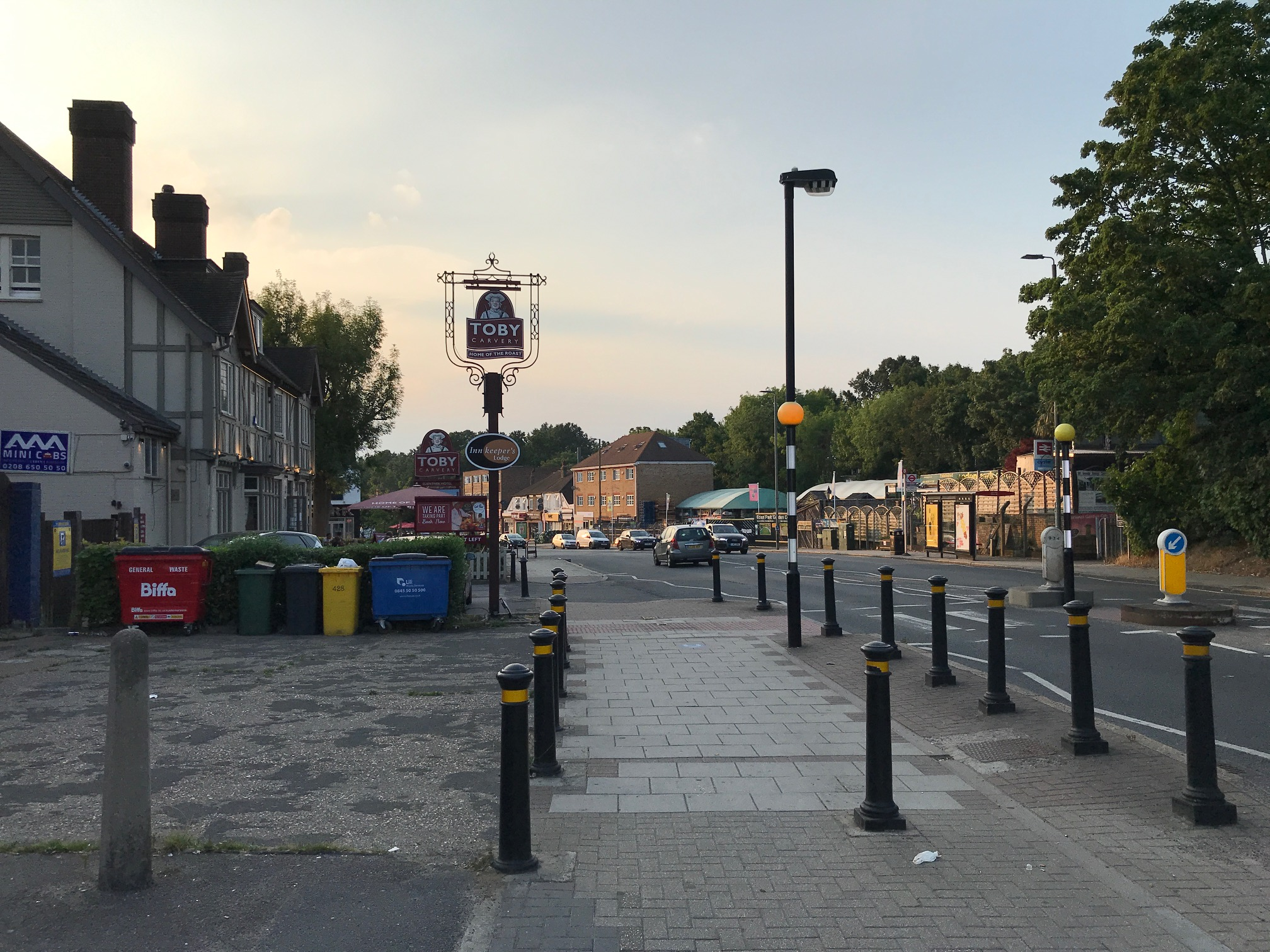
The main parade of shops by the train station, looking west

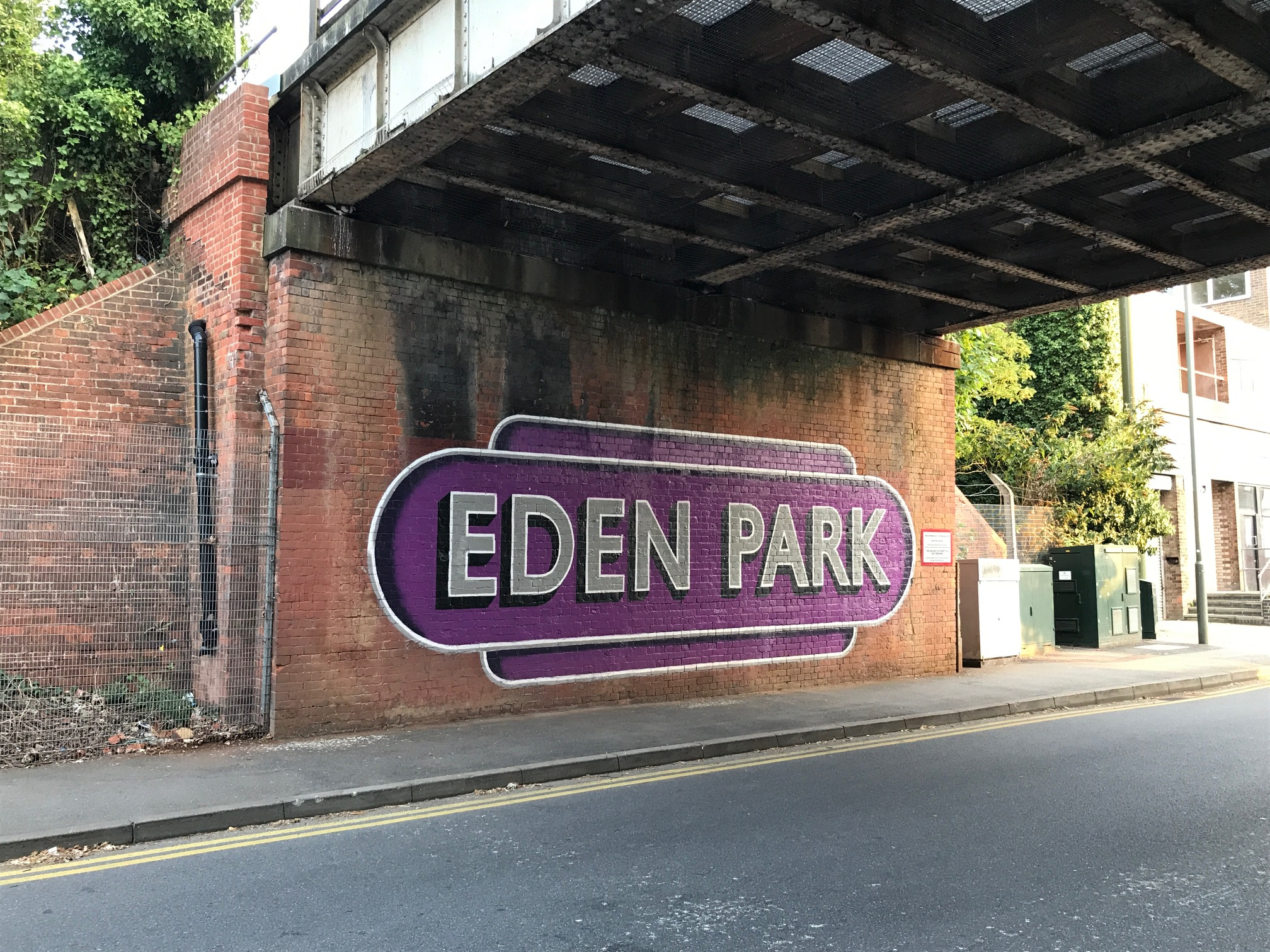
The railway bridge at the bottom of Eden Park Avenue

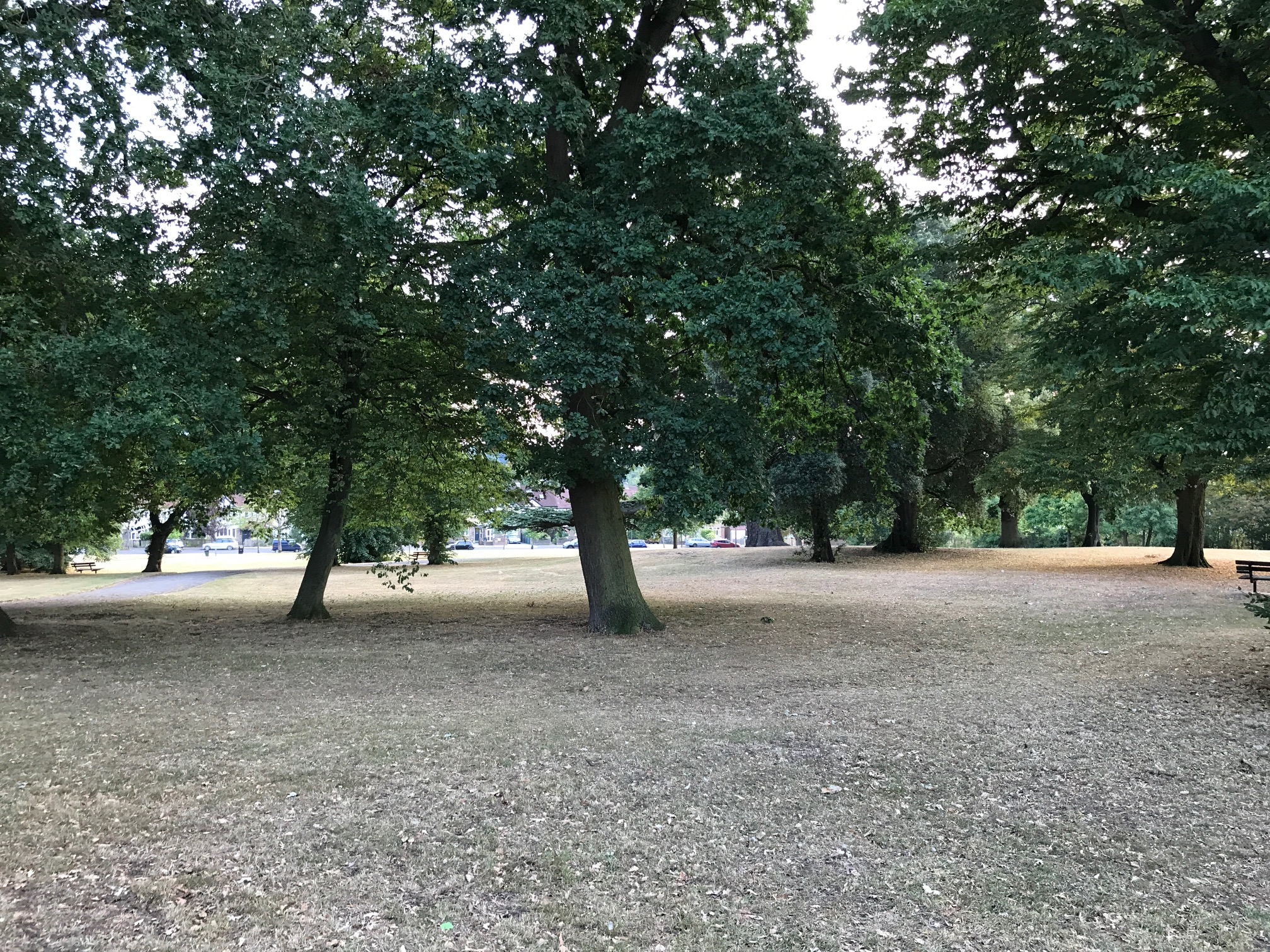
Crease Park

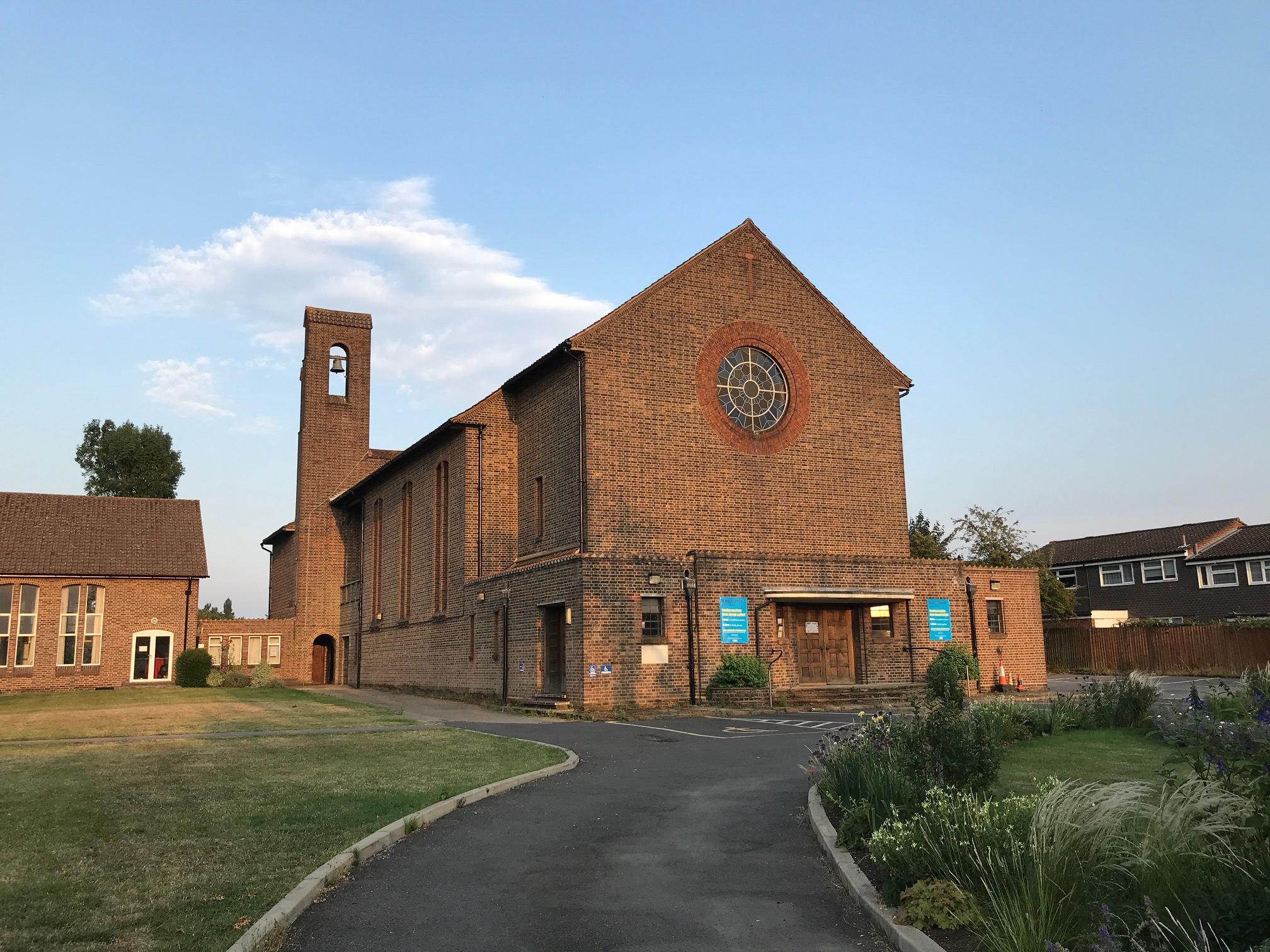
St John the Baptist church on Eden Park Avenue, built in the 1936
