= New Beckenham railway station =

National Rail station in London, England

New Beckenham
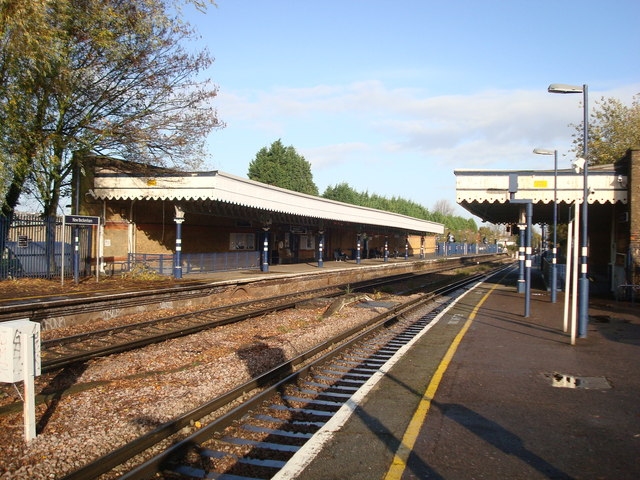
- Interactive map of New Beckenham

General information
- Location: New Beckenham
- Local authority: Bromley
- Managed by: Southeastern
- Station code: NBC
- DfT category: E
- Number of platforms: 2
- Accessible: Yes
- Fare zone: 4

National Rail annual entry and exit
- 2020–21: ▼0.155 million
- 2021–22: ▲0.418 million
- 2022–23: ▲0.545 million
- 2023–24: ▲0.667 million
- 2024–25: ▲0.721 million

Railway companies
- Original company: Mid-Kent Railway
- Pre-grouping: South Eastern and Chatham Railway
- Post-grouping: Southern Railway

Key dates
- 1 April 1864: Opened
- 1866: Resited north

Other information
- External links: Departures; Facilities
- Coordinates: 51.4164°N 0.0348°W

New Beckenham railway station serves Beckenham in the London Borough of Bromley in south-east London, in London fare zone 4. It is 9 miles 44 chains (15.4 km) measured from London Charing Cross.

The station and all trains serving it are operated by Southeastern.

The station is adjacent to the HSBC Sports and Social Club. The Club is the base of New Beckenham Hockey Club who currently have three men's and three ladies hockey teams and play competitive fixtures in the Kent Hockey League.

== History ==
=== Early years (1857–1922) ===
The Mid-Kent line was built by the Mid-Kent and North Kent Junction Railway (MK&NKJR), and was opened as far as Beckenham Junction on 1 January 1857 (although at that time it was not technically a junction, for the West End of London and Crystal Palace Railway's line did not open until 3 May 1858).

From its opening the line was worked by the South Eastern Railway (SER).

Seven years later, the MK&NKJR built an extension from a new junction station at New Beckenham to Croydon (Addiscombe Road), which again was operated by the SER. This first short-lived station was located immediately south of the junction and may have had platforms on the 1857 and 1864 lines. Two years later, in October 1866, the current station built just north of the junction was opened.

New spacious villas were laid out on the Cator estate between 1870 and 1880, attracting new business to the railway.

The Elmers End – Hayes section was built by the West Wickham & Hayes Railway, but was sold to the South Eastern Railway on opening day, 29 May 1882. (Note: The current Hayes service (2016) which serves the station uses the 1857 line to New Beckenham, the 1864 line to Elmers End and the 1882 line to Hayes.)

Almost all services from the station have terminated at Charing Cross or Cannon Street stations; however, between 1880 and 1884 a service worked from Addiscombe Road calling at all stations to New Cross, and then via a connection to the East London Line, terminating at Liverpool Street.

The South Eastern Railway and its bitter rival the London, Chatham and Dover Railway agreed in 1898 to work as one railway company, under the name of the South Eastern and Chatham Railway, and New Beckenham became an SECR station.

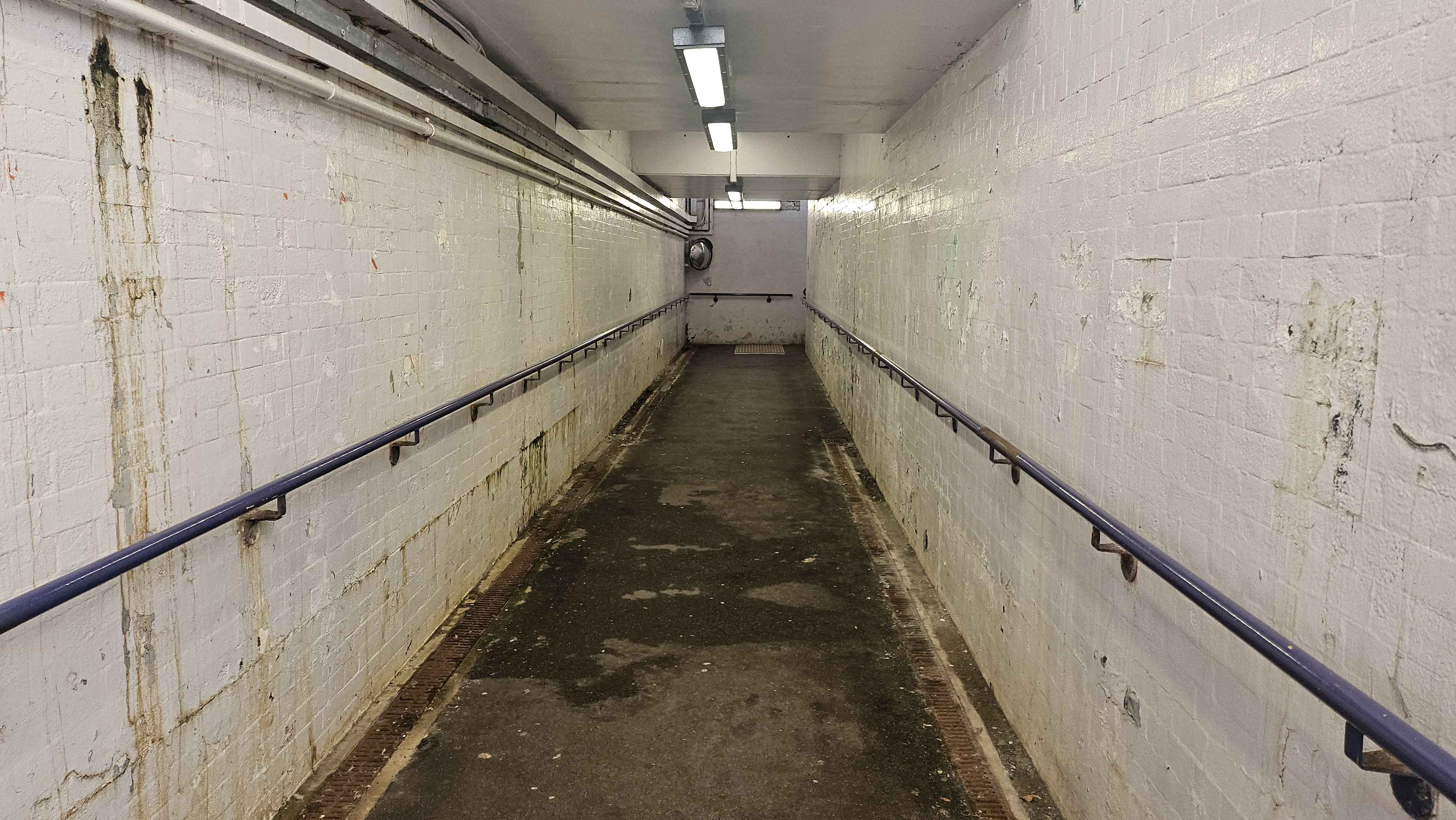
The station's subway, located underneath the tracks.

The station was rebuilt in 1904. At this time a middle road was laid, level crossings were replaced by road bridges, and a tiled subway and a new 50-lever signal box were provided. At this time there were, as well as through workings, services that terminated or attached to other London-bound trains at New Beckenham. The short link to Beckenham Junction was also served by a shuttle service from New Beckenham.

=== Southern Railway (1923–1947) ===
Following the Railways Act 1921 (also known as the Grouping Act), New Beckenham became a Southern Railway station on 1 January 1923.

The Mid-Kent line was electrified with the 750 V DC third rail system, and electric services commenced on 28 February 1926. Early electric services were worked by early Southern Railway 3-car Electric Multiple Unit trains, often built from old SECR carriages.

The middle road was removed in 1929.

=== British Railways (1948–1994) ===
After the Second World War and following nationalisation on 1 January 1948, the station fell under the auspices of British Railways Southern Region.

Colour light signalling was introduced between Ladywell and New Beckenham on 4 April 1971, with signalling being controlled by the signal box at New Beckenham. Semaphore signalling remained to the south of the station until 28 September 1975, when the control of the signalling was transferred to London Bridge signalling centre, and New Beckenham signal box (a two-storey structure located at the end of the down platform) was closed.

Upon sectorisation in 1982, two passenger sectors were created: InterCity, operating principal express services; and London & South East (renamed Network SouthEast in 1986) which operated commuter services in the London area.

The spur between New Beckenham and Beckenham Junction (the original 1857 route) was reduced to single track in 1987, with a stabling siding replacing the lifted line. Regular services had not been run over the line for many years, but in the 1990s a Cannon Street-Lewisham-New Beckenham-Bromley South-Orpington service briefly operated.

=== The privatisation era (1994–present day) ===
Following privatisation of British Rail on 1 April 1994, the infrastructure at New Beckenham station became the responsibility of Railtrack, while a business unit operated the train services. On 13 October 1996, operation of the passenger services passed to Connex South Eastern which was originally due to run the franchise until 2011.

Following a number of accidents and financial issues, Railtrack plc was sold on 3 October 2002 to Network Rail, which became responsible for the infrastructure.

The Strategic Rail Authority decided on 27 June 2003 to strip Connex of the franchise, citing poor financial management, and to run the franchise itself. Connex South Eastern continued to operate the franchise until 8 November 2003, with the services transferring to the Strategic Rail Authority's South Eastern Trains subsidiary the following day.

On 30 November 2005, the Department for Transport awarded Govia the Integrated Kent franchise. The services operated by South Eastern Trains transferred to Southeastern on 1 April 2006.

== Services ==
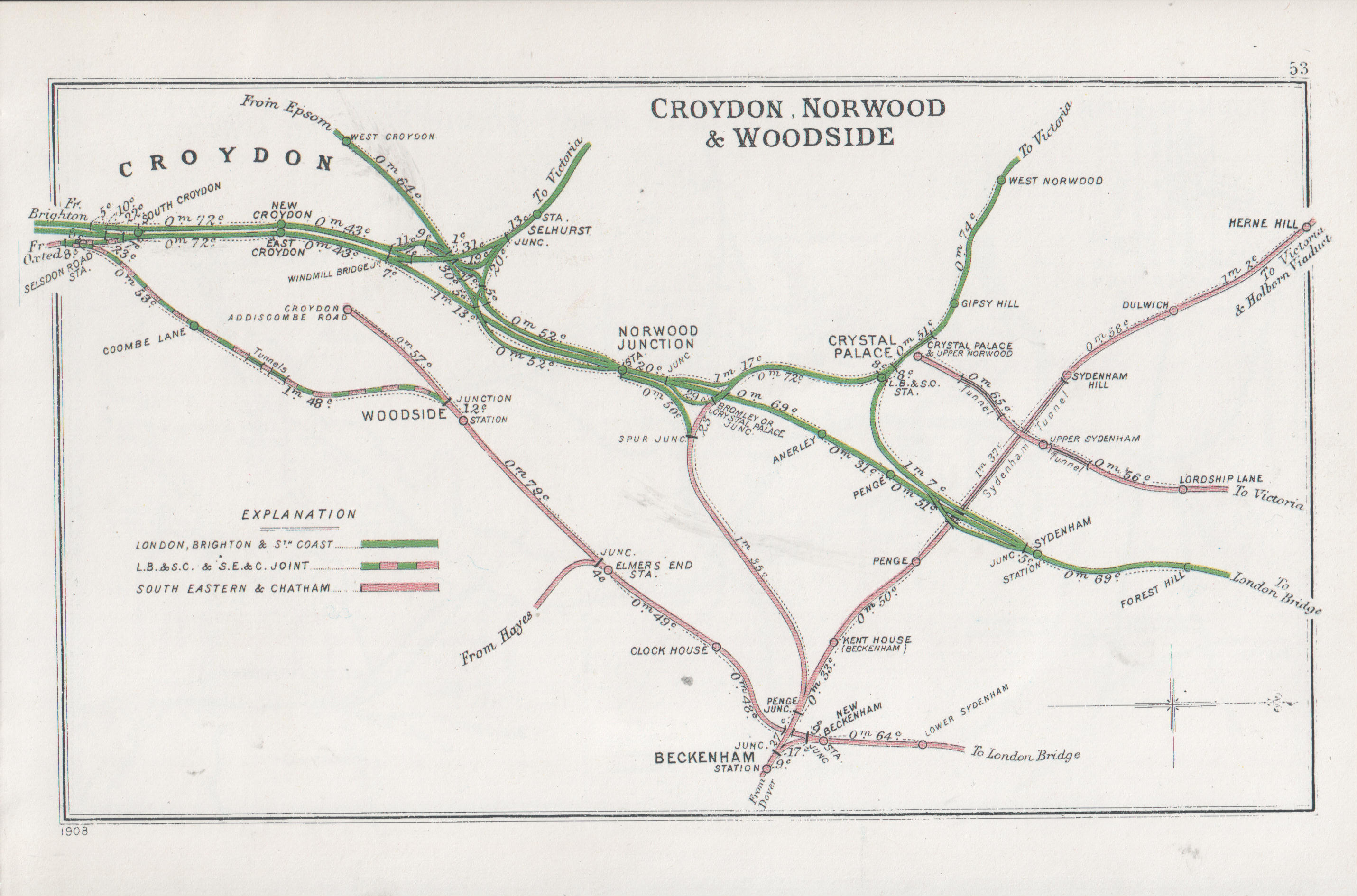
A 1908 Railway Clearing House map of part of the Hayes Line, between Lower Sydenham and Elmers End, including New Beckenham (bottom centre)

Services

=== Historical services ===
In 1912, the daily down services to New Beckenham consisted of:

From	To	Route	Number per day	Notes
Charing Cross	Beckenham Junction or Addiscombe	via Cannon Street & London Bridge	10	Train splits at New Beckenham
Charing Cross	Addiscombe	via Cannon Street and London Bridge	2	
Charing Cross	Addiscombe	via London Bridge	2	
Charing Cross	Beckenham Junction	via London Bridge	2	
Charing Cross	Addiscombe/Beckenham Junction & Orpington	via London Bridge	1	Train splits at New Beckenham
Cannon Street	Beckenham Junction & Orpington	via London Bridge	12	
Cannon Street	Addiscombe	via London Bridge	4	
Cannon Street	Beckenham Junction	via London Bridge	3	
Cannon Street	Selsdon	via London Bridge	1	
Cannon Street	Edenbridge	via London Bridge	1	
St Pauls (Blackfriars)	Beckenham Junction	via London Bridge	1	Terminates

=== Current services ===
All services at New Beckenham are operated by Southeastern using Class 376, 465, 466 and 707 EMUs.

The typical off-peak service in trains per hour is:

- 4 tph to London Charing Cross (2 of these run non-stop between Ladywell and London Bridge and 2 call at Lewisham)
- 4 tph to Hayes

On Sundays, the station is served by a half-hourly service between Hayes and London Charing Cross via Lewisham.

Preceding station	National Rail	Following station
Lower Sydenham	Southeastern Hayes Line	Clock House

== Connections ==
London Buses route 352 serves the station.
