= Elmers End =

Area of south-east London, England

Coordinates: 51.3971°N 0.0525°W

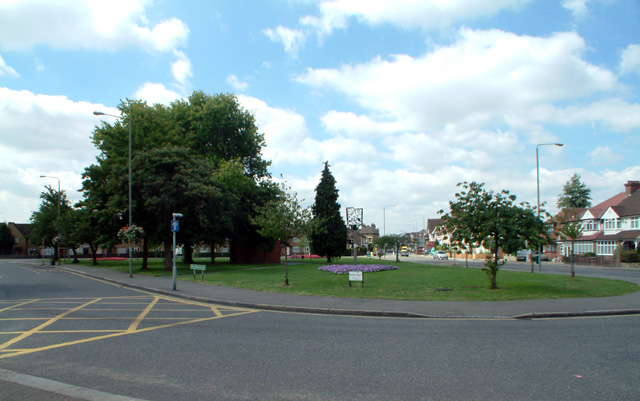
- Elmers End Green

- Location within Greater London
- OS grid reference: TQ355685
- London borough: Bromley
- Ceremonial county: Greater London
- Region: London
- Country: England
- Sovereign state: United Kingdom
- Post town: BECKENHAM
- Postcode district: BR3
- Dialling code: 020
- Police: Metropolitan
- Fire: London
- Ambulance: London
- UK Parliament: Beckenham and Penge
- London Assembly: Bexley and Bromley

Elmers End is an area of south-east London, England, within the London Borough of Bromley, Greater London and formerly part of the historic county of Kent. It is located south of Beckenham, west of Eden Park, north of Monks Orchard and south-east of Anerley.

== History ==
The name Elmers End was probably from the Aylmer family marking the Southern 'end' of the land, local landowners in the 13th century, although the Aylmer family's clan rarely left the Great North Wood area, which took up most of Norwood and Crystal Palace. An alternative view is that the land was owned by Ralph Aylmer during the reign of Henry III (1216–1272) and was classified as a 'district'.

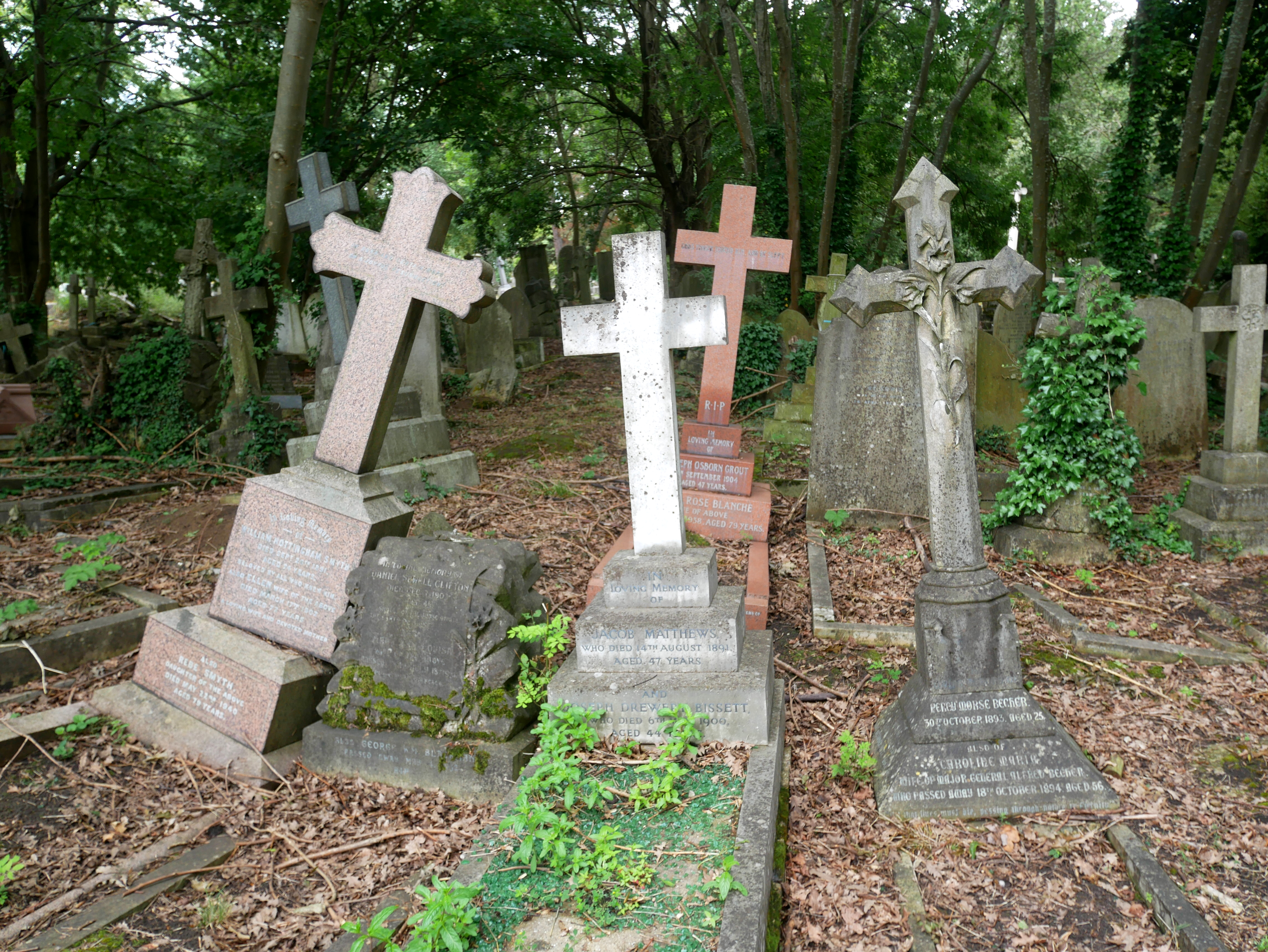
Beckenham Cemetery is located in Elmers End

The name Beckenham came about 50 years later, although this claim is completely contradicted by the Bromley Council website which shows Beckenham being historically present since AD862 and Elmers End since AD1226.

Elmers End station opened in 1864 in what was then still a rural area. From the 1860s a sewage farm was opened, and housing gradually began to be built in the area, centred on the large green space which is the centre of a gyratory. Development continued apace in the early 20th century, with a large industrial estate being built on the south side of the railway track, which has since closed; it used to house the Muirhead and Twinlock factories, and can be seen from the air here. The companies vacated the sites and it remained derelict until 1995 when Tesco built a new superstore. The former Bolloms paint factory site, on the opposite side of the road has been redeveloped into an industrial estate. An Odeon cinema stood on Elmers End Green from 1939 to 1959. In the 1960s the sewage farm closed; as it is thought to be contaminated with heavy metals it was considered unfit for building houses and was later converted into a nature park (South Norwood Country Park), which falls within the boundaries of the London Borough of Croydon.

The main Beckenham crematorium is situated between South Norwood Country Park and Birkbeck station. Also known as Elmers End Cemetery, it contains the final resting places of such notable people as W.G. Grace, Frank Bourne, Thomas Crapper, Jerzy Wołkowicki, William Stanley and George Evans (VC) who won a Victoria Cross in 1916.

=== Upper Elmers End ===
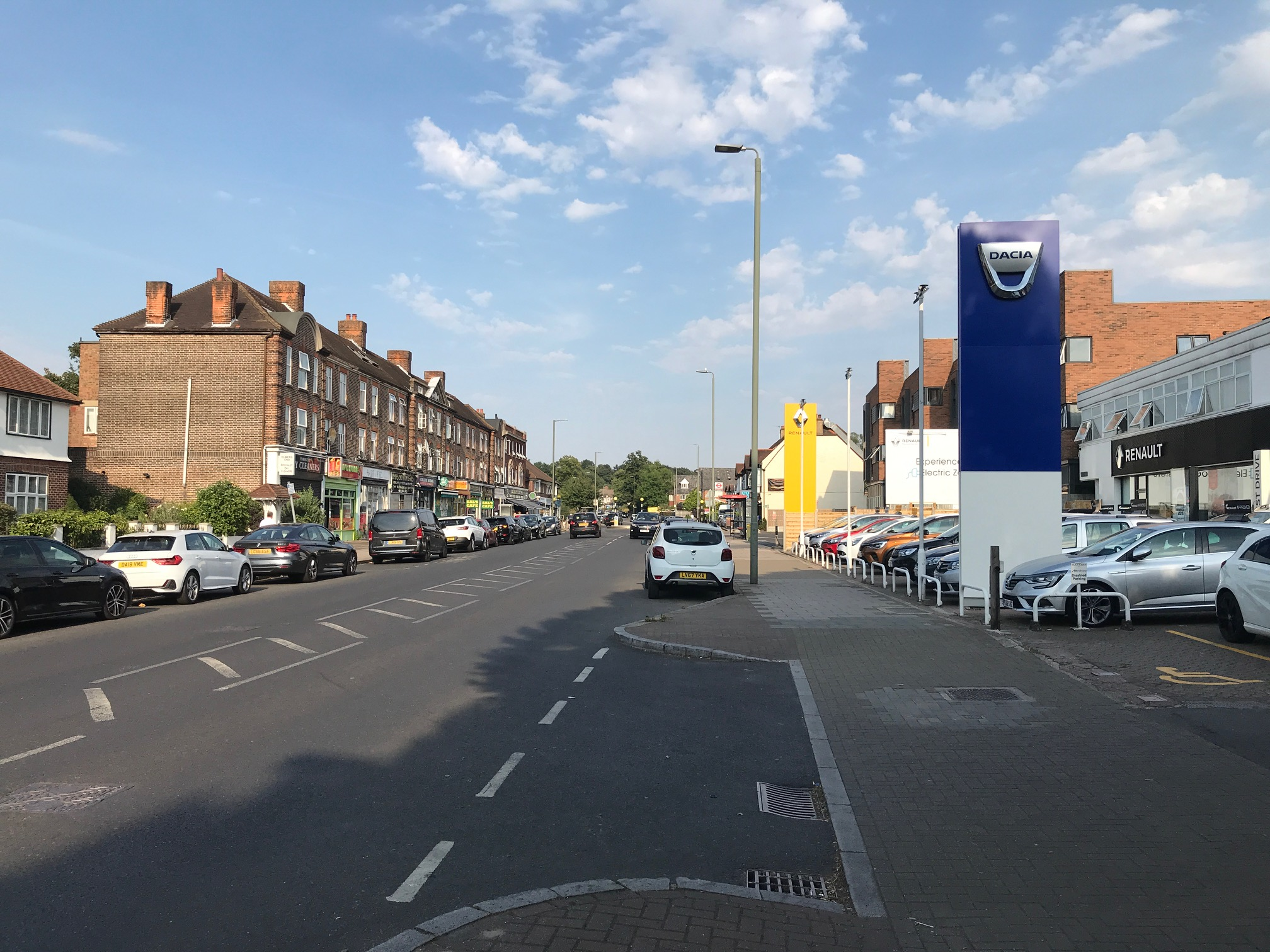
The centre of Upper Elmers End today

This was once a small hamlet distinct from Elmers End proper, centred on the sharp bend on Upper Elmers End Road south of the railway line. The hamlet was the site of a brewery, which was converted into Kempton's bakery in the 1930s. It was around this period that large scale housing development began in the area, with Upper Elmers End merging into Elmers End and Eden Park over time and losing its separate identity.

== Transport ==
=== Rail ===
Elmers End railway station connects the area with Southeastern services to London Charing Cross and London Cannon Street via Catford Bridge and to Hayes. There are also Tramlink services to Wimbledon via East Croydon.

=== Buses ===
Elmers End is served by several bus routes provided by Transport for London. These connect Elmers End with areas including Beckenham, Bromley, Catford, Croydon, Crystal Palace, Lewisham, Orpington, Penge, Purley and Woolwich.

== Notable people ==
- Walter de la Mare - poet and author, commemorated with a plaque on 195 Mackenzie Road.
- John Fry - renowned doctor, researcher and writer, commemorated with a plaque on St James's Practice.

== Gallery ==
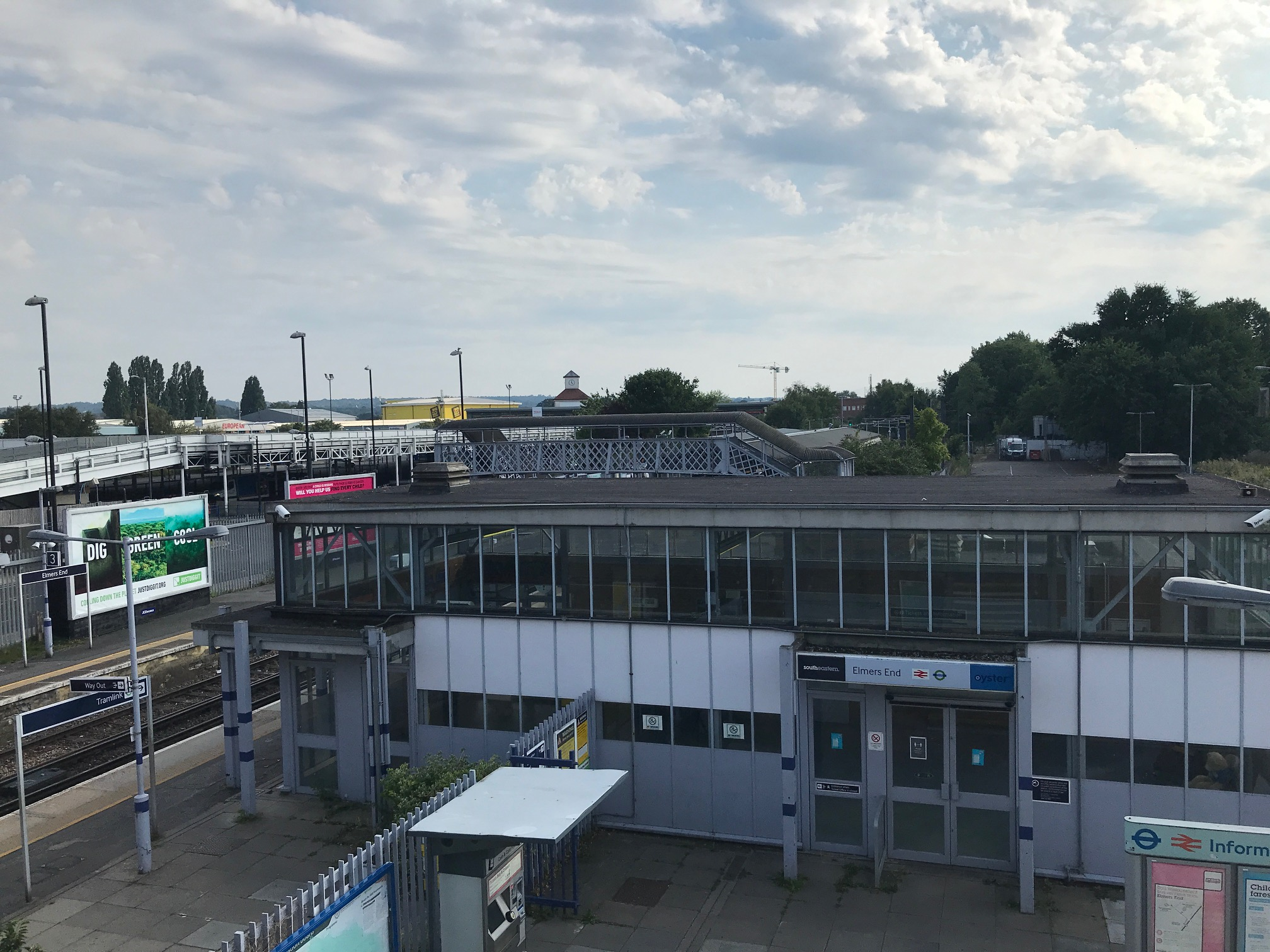
Elmers End station, with the Tesco superstore to the rear-left

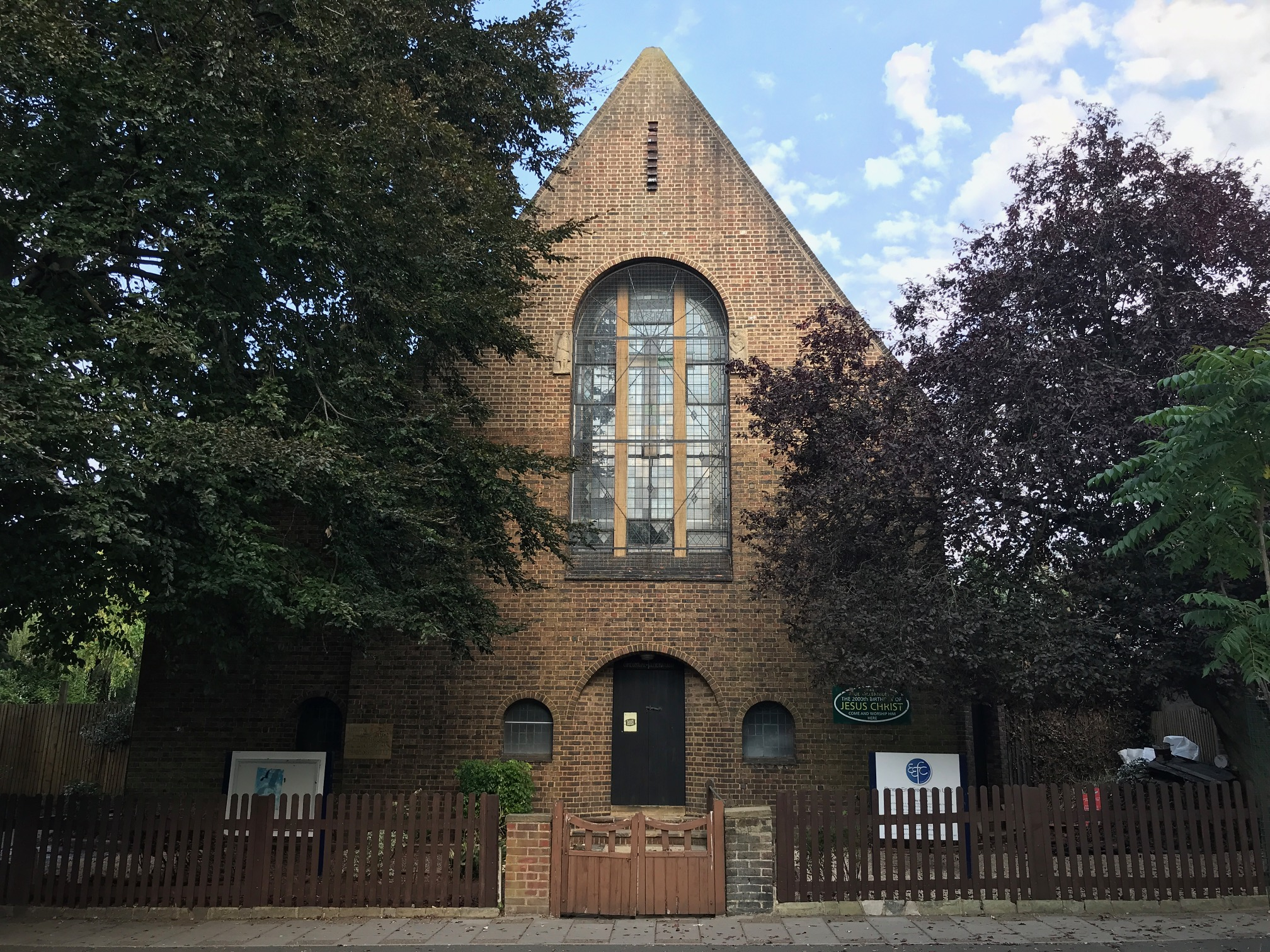
Elmers End United Reformed Church

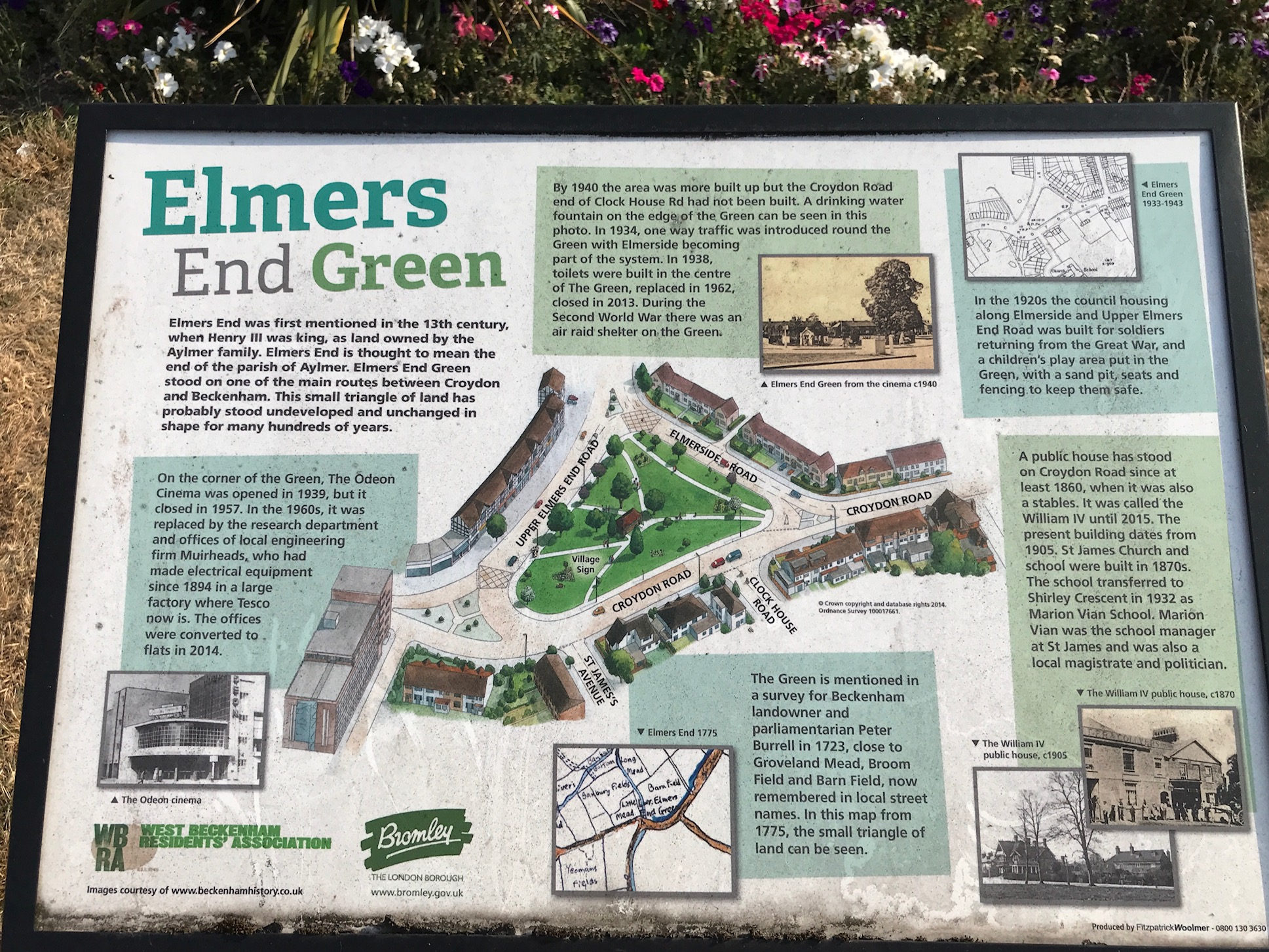
History information board on Elmers End Green

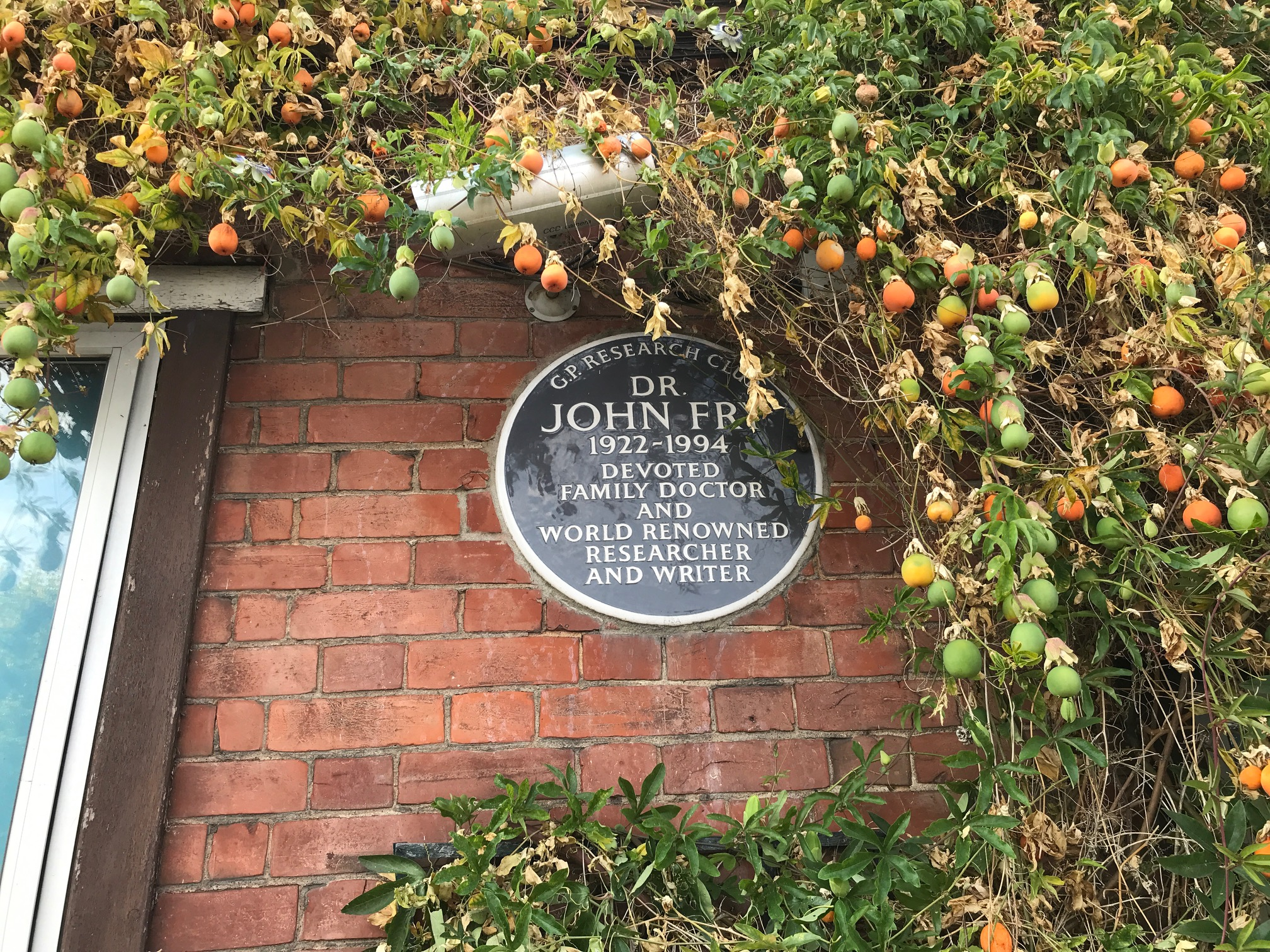
Plaque to John Fry on St James's Practice

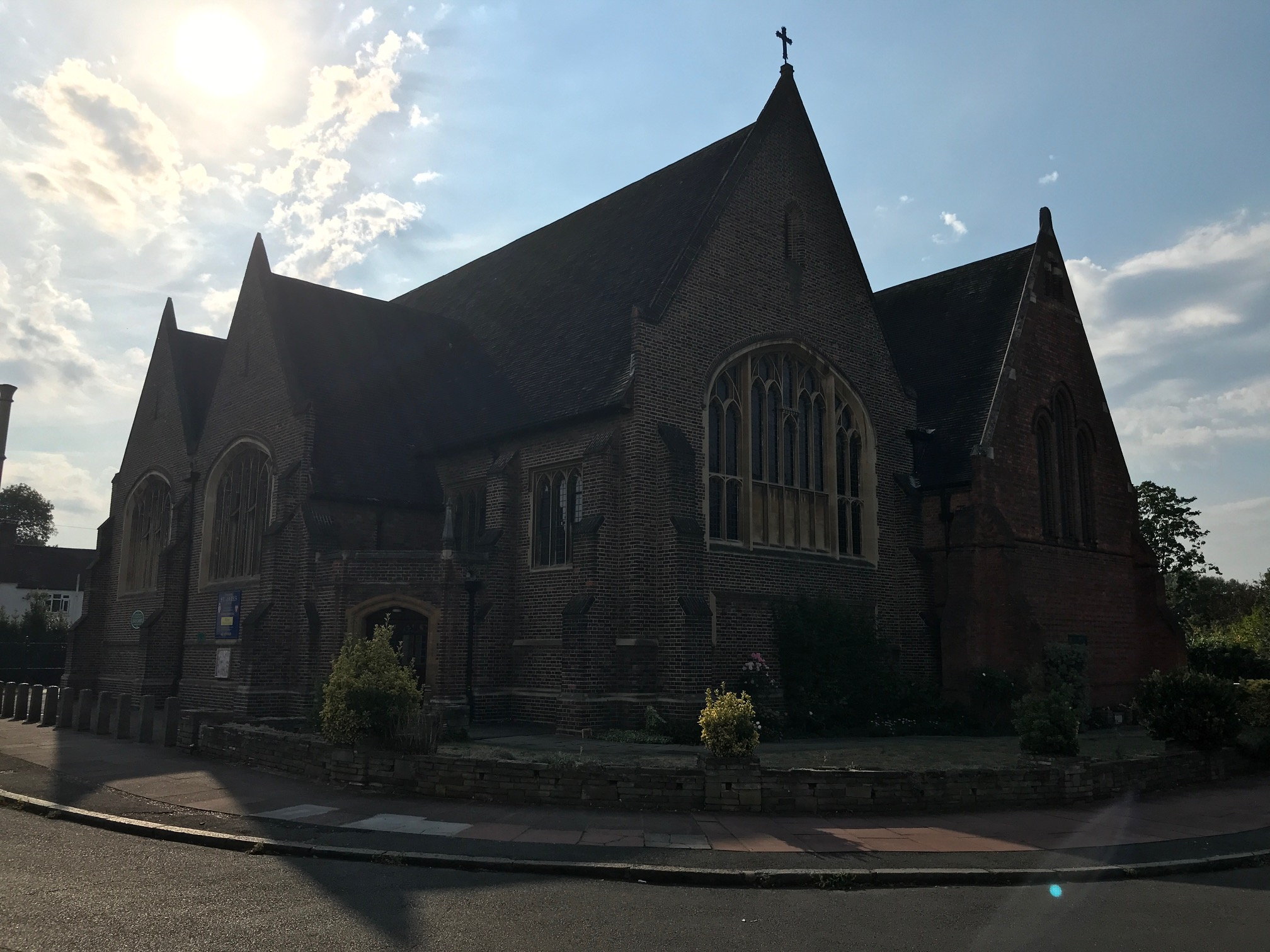
St James Church

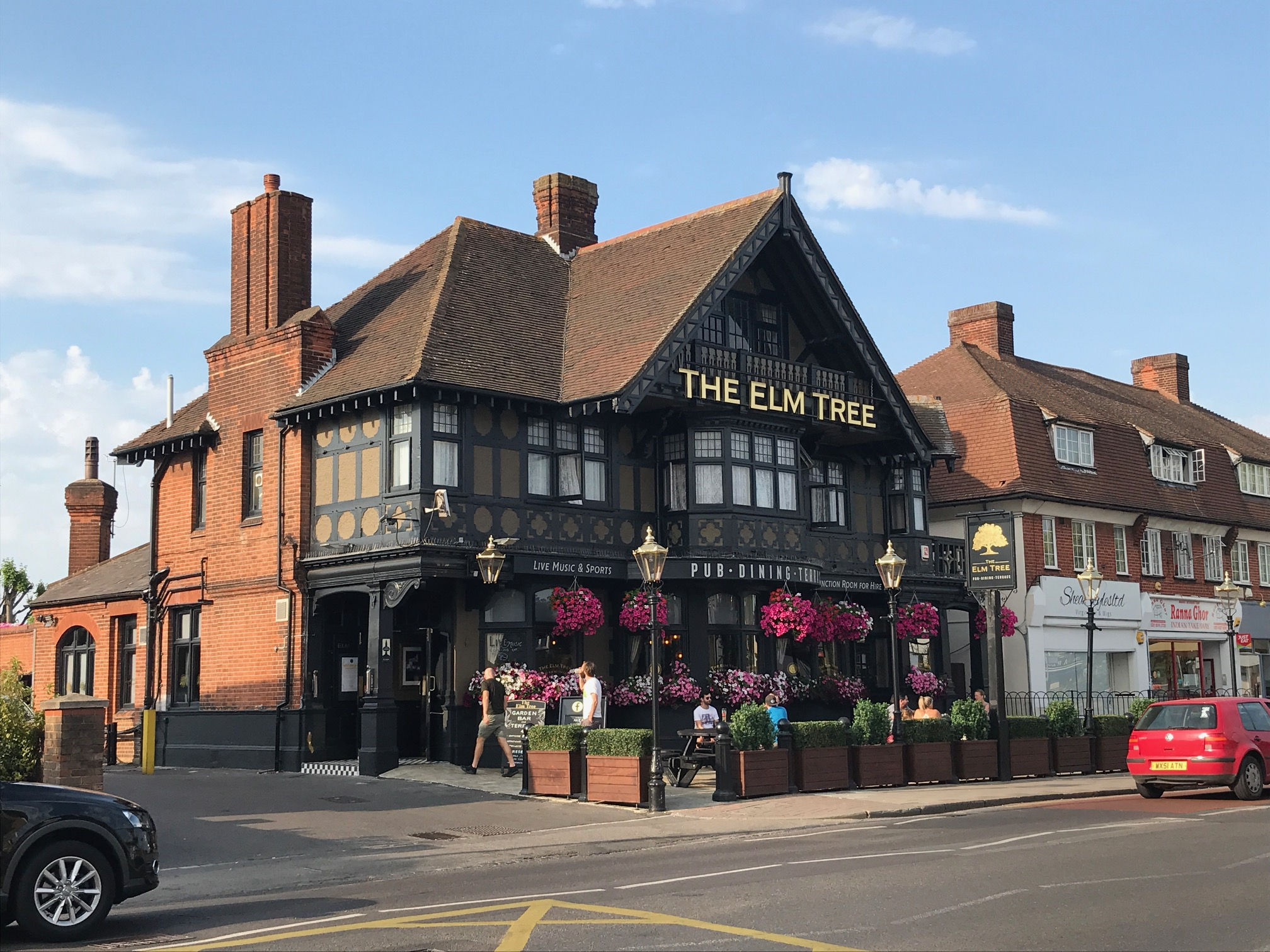
The Elm Tree pub (formerly the William IV)

== Notes ==
- Historical images of Elmers End
