= Hayes line =

Railway line in the UK

Coordinates: 51.4158°N 0.0353°W

Mid-Kent line / Hayes line
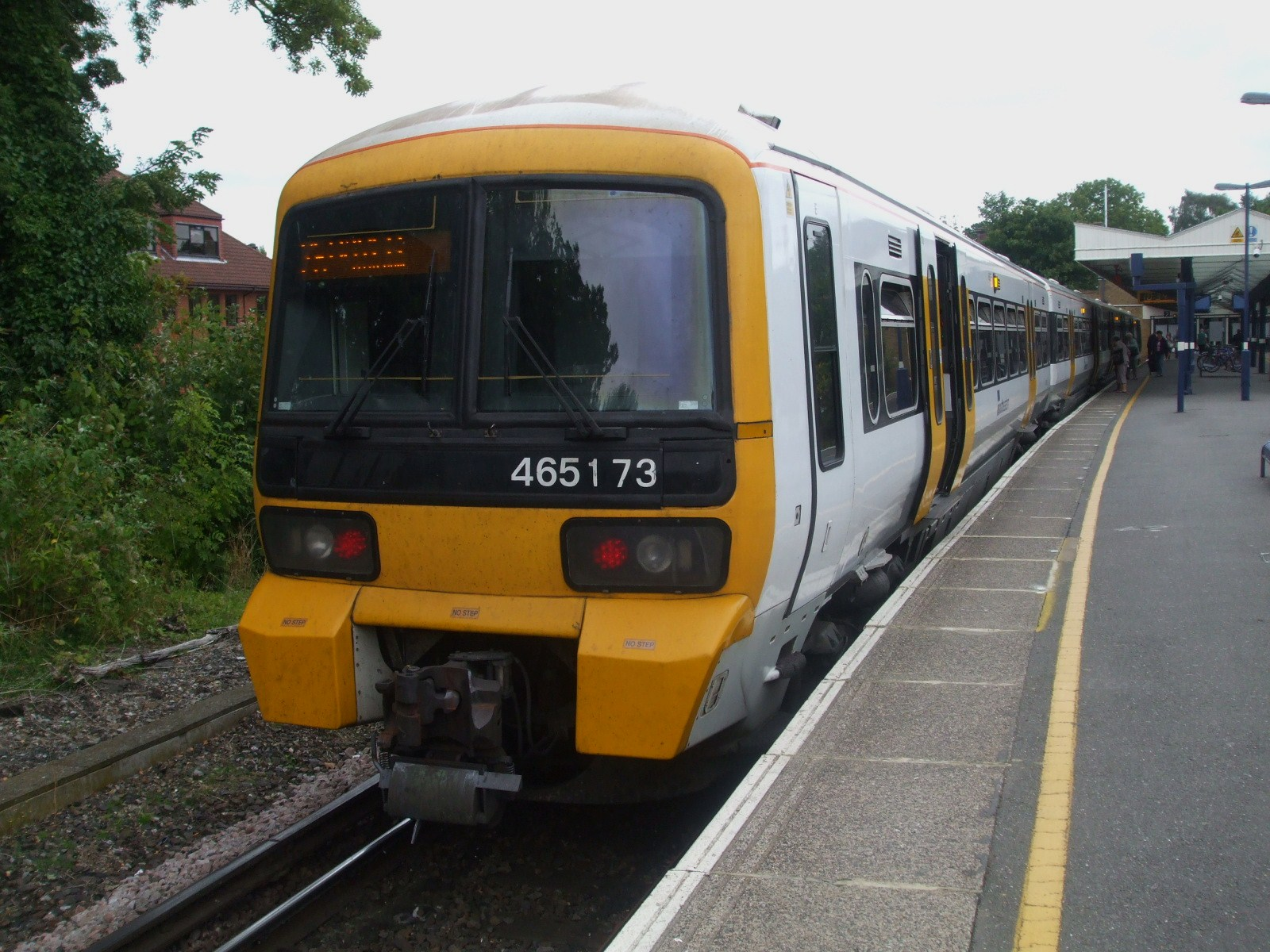
- A Southeastern Class 465 at Hayes station

Overview
- Status: Operational
- Owner: Network Rail
- Locale: Greater London
- Termini: Lewisham; Hayes
- Stations: 10

Service
- Type: Commuter rail, Suburban rail
- System: National Rail
- Operator: Southeastern
- Rolling stock: Class 376 "Electrostar"; Class 465 "Networker"; Class 466 "Networker"; Class 707 "Desiro City"

History
- Opened: 1857

Technical
- Number of tracks: 2
- Track gauge: 1,435 mm (4 ft 8 1/2 in) standard gauge
- Electrification: 750 V Direct Current third rail
- Operating speed: 60 mph (97 km/h) maximum
Route map
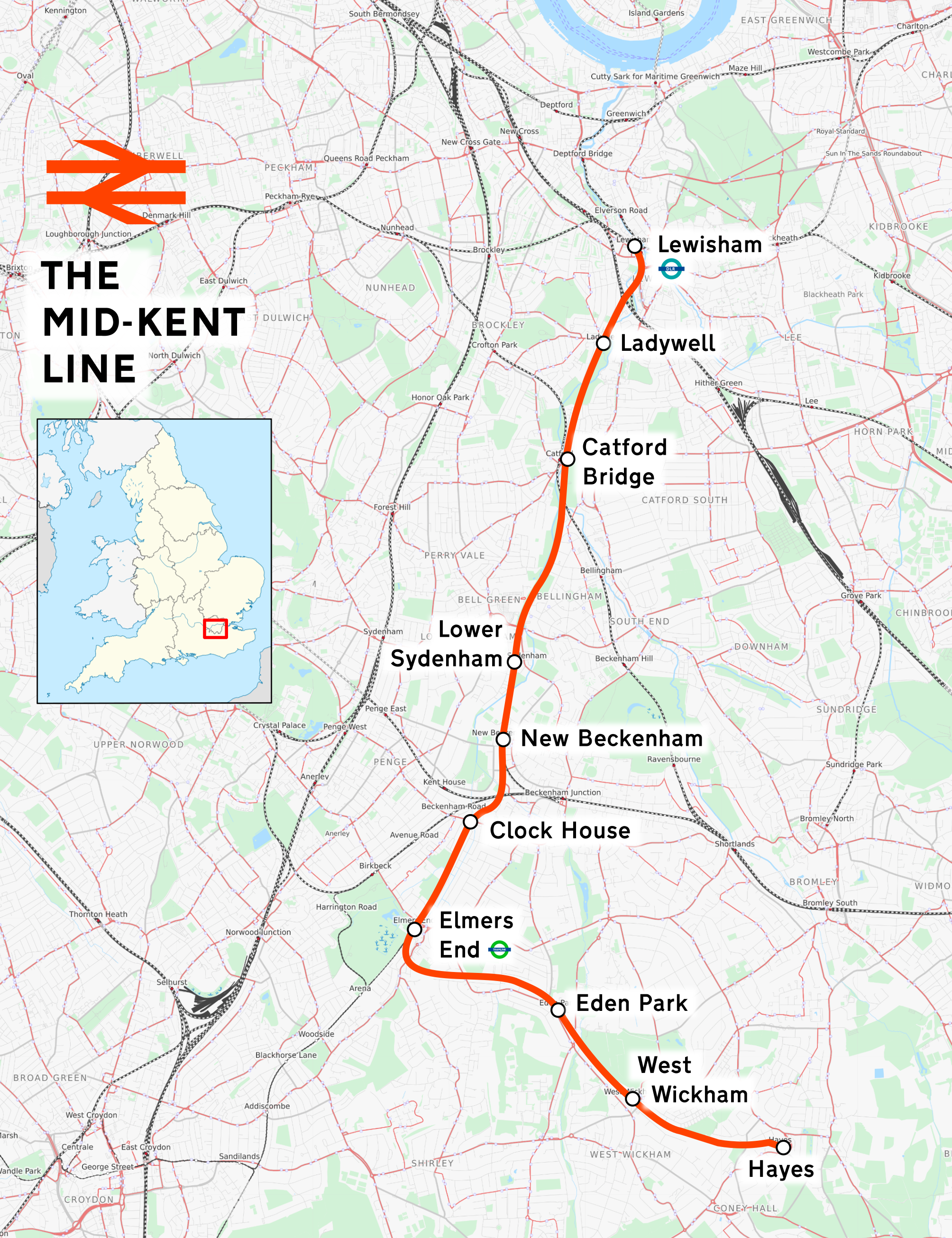
(Click to expand)

The Hayes line, originally and in some uses still known as the Mid-Kent line, is a British railway line running from Courthill Loop North junction (just south of Lewisham station) to Hayes railway station in the London Borough of Bromley. Originally known as the Mid Kent Railway, it became known as the Mid-Kent Line. It has increasingly become to be known as the Hayes Line however, with none of the line in the present-day county of Kent.

== Description ==
- Services commence at Charing Cross via Waterloo East.
- London Bridge – North Kent Junction, Bermondsey: The pioneer London and Greenwich Railway opened its line on 8 February 1836. This section is built on a brick viaduct
- North Kent Junction – Lewisham: opened 30 July 1849 as the North Kent Railway, now called the North Kent line. Most of the railway here is in cutting with the four tracks passing through St Johns railway station, the two northernmost leading into Lewisham station.
- Lewisham – New Beckenham: opened 1 January 1857 as the Mid-Kent line. This opening created a junction at Lewisham.
- New Beckenham – Elmers End: opened on 1 April 1864 as part of an extension of the Mid-Kent line to Addiscombe
- Elmers End – Hayes: this section was built by the West Wickham & Hayes Railway, but was sold to the South Eastern Railway on opening day, 29 May 1882

== Services ==
All services along the line are operated by Southeastern. The standard off-peak service is four trains per hour (tph) each way between London Charing Cross and Hayes, two non-stop between London Bridge and Ladywell, and two that stop additionally at Lewisham.

== History ==
=== Early years 1857–1922 ===
The existing Mid-Kent line consists of three sections built at different times. The Mid Kent Railway was built by the Mid Kent and North Kent Junction Railway (MK&NKJR) and was opened on 1 January 1857 from Lewisham (where the existing station was closed and a new station re-opened at the junction) as far as Beckenham Junction (although it was not technically a junction as the West End of London and Crystal Palace Railway’s line did not open until 3 May 1858). From opening the line was worked by the South Eastern Railway (SER) and served new stations at Ladywell, Catford Bridge, Lower Sydenham and Beckenham (Junction).

Seven years later the MK&NKJR built an extension from a new junction station at New Beckenham to Croydon (Addiscombe Road) which again was operated by the SER. The line diverged from the 1857 line to the west of Beckenham Junction and a new station was built in the junction area. This was re-located northwards two years later.

In September 1866 a short spur was opened from the north end of Ladywell station to the recently opened South Eastern Main Line avoiding Lewisham station, which it joins at Parks Bridge Junction.

West Wickham and Hayes Railway Act 1880
- Act of Parliament
- Parliament of the United Kingdom
- Long title: An Act for making a railway in the parishes of Beckenham, Wickham otherwise West Wickham, and Hayes, in the county of Kent; and for other purposes.
- Citation: 43 & 44 Vict. c. l

Dates
- Royal assent: 9 July 1880

Text of statute as originally enacted

The Elmers End – Hayes section was built by the West Wickham and Hayes Railway, but was sold to the South Eastern Railway in 1881, opening on 29 May 1882. Intermediate stations were opened at Eden Park and West Wickham.

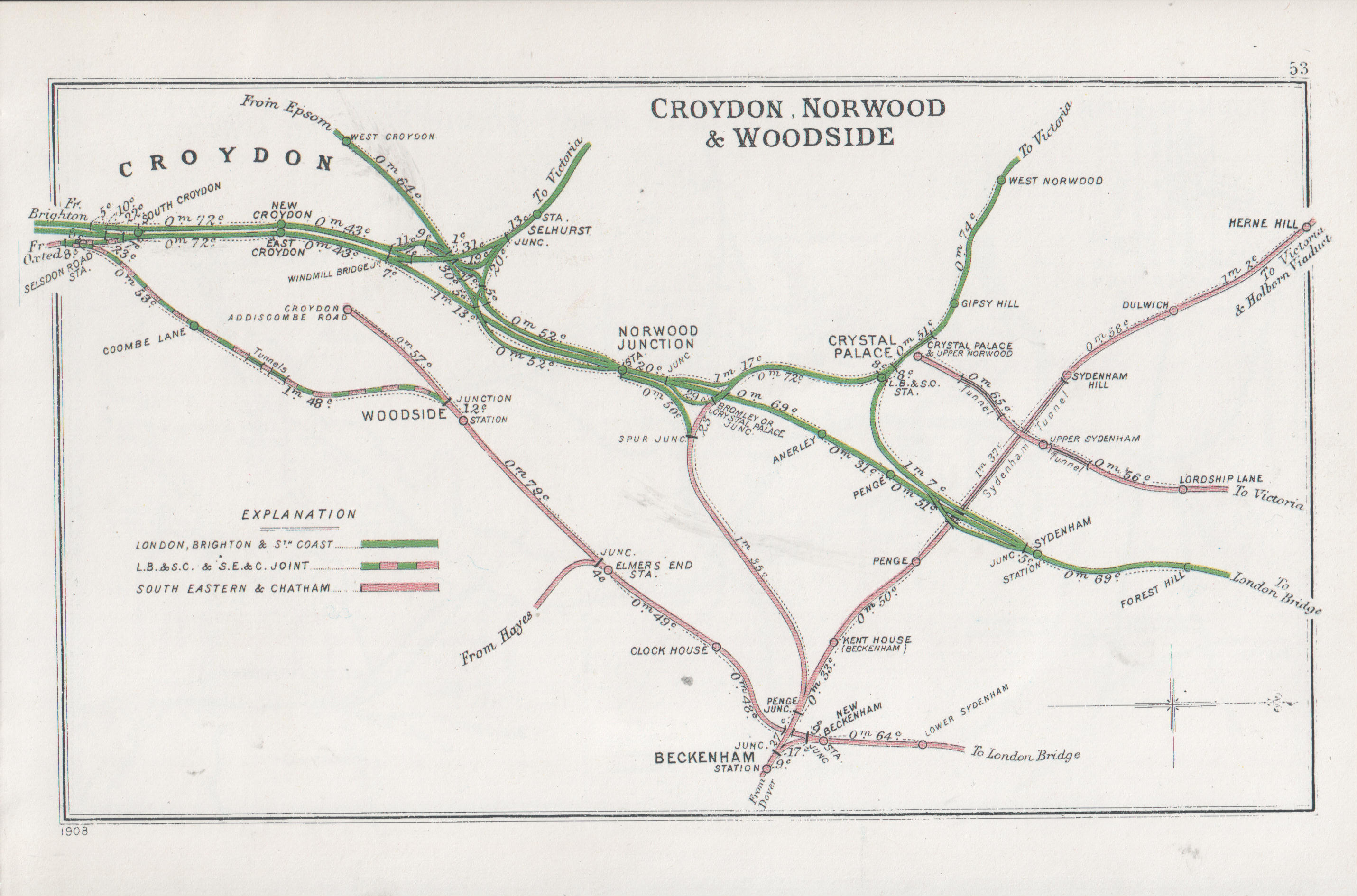
A 1908 Railway Clearing House map of part of the Hayes Line, between Lower Sydenham and Elmers End, showing the now closed Addiscombe Line and W&SCR branches off the Hayes Line

Clock House station was opened in June 1890.

In 1898 the South Eastern Railway and its bitter rivals the London Chatham and Dover Railway agreed to work as one railway company under the name of the South Eastern and Chatham Railway and thus the stations became an SECR stations.

The original Lower Sydenham station was closed and moved half a mile south in 1906 in an attempt to develop a new area for housing.

On 14 June 1913 members of the Suffragettes movement planted a bomb which was discovered in the ladies waiting room at Eden Park railway station. The clockwork mechanism had stopped working and so it didn't go off. This event followed the death of Emily Wilding Davison six days earlier after her attempt to stop the King's horse at The Derby.

=== Southern Railway 1923–1947 ===
Following the Railways Act 1921 (also known as the Grouping Act), the Mid-Kent line came under the control of the Southern Railway. The line was electrified with other SECR suburban routes in 1926.

Hayes, West Wickham and Elmers End stations were all damaged by enemy bombs during the Second World War, in 1940.

=== British Railways 1948–1994 ===
After World War II and following nationalisation on 1 January 1948, the line became part of British Railways Southern Region.

In 1956 platform lengths were extended to accommodate 10-car trains.

During the 1960s the local goods yards at Catford Bridge, Lower Sydenham, Clock House, Elmers End, West Wickham and Hayes all closed as did the gas works internal railway at Lower Sydenham.

Colour light signalling was introduced south of Ladywell (as far as New Beckenham) on 4 April 1971. The line was fully converted to colour light operation in September 1975 under the control of London Bridge Signalling Centre. The old mechanical signal boxes closed at this time.

Upon sectorisation in 1982, the line came under the control of the London & South East sector, which was renamed Network SouthEast in 1986.

Goods services were withdrawn in 1964 with the exception of Beckenham Junction which survived until 1982.

During the planning of the London Underground Fleet line, now the Jubilee line, it was suggested that the Mid-Kent line be taken over. However a more northerly alignment was instead taken. The section from Elmers End to Addiscombe was closed in 1997 and taken over by Tramlink operations.

== Future plans ==
Since the late 2000s, Transport for London (TfL) has been planning an extension of the Bakerloo line from Elephant & Castle to Lewisham via Old Kent Road. Following completion of the Lewisham extension, TfL proposes extending the line over the existing National Rail line to Hayes and Beckenham Junction, adding an additional 10 stations to the line. The line would have to be converted for the Bakerloo line; TfL has stated that all stations along the line would be made step-free from street to train. Bromley Council is supportive of the extension to Lewisham, but does not support the extension to Hayes and Beckenham Junction.

Due to the financial situations resulting from the COVID-19 pandemic, work to implement the extension is currently on hold. In March 2021, TfL's finance chief stated that the extension would not be seen in the next decade.
