= Ladywell railway station =

National Rail station in London, England

Ladywell
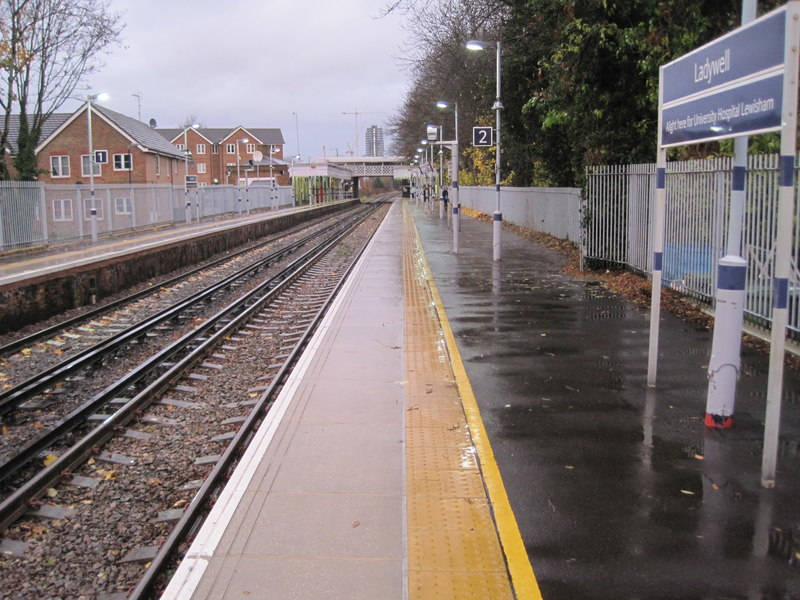
- Interactive map of Ladywell

General information
- Location: Ladywell
- Local authority: Lewisham
- Managed by: Southeastern
- Station code: LAD
- DfT category: E
- Number of platforms: 2
- Accessible: Yes
- Fare zone: 3

National Rail annual entry and exit
- 2020–21: ▼0.352 million
- 2021–22: ▲0.741 million
- 2022–23: ▲0.918 million
- 2023–24: ▲1.126 million
- 2024–25: ▲1.255 million

Key dates
- 1 January 1857: Opened

Listed status
- Listed feature: Ladywell Station
- Listing grade: II
- Entry number: 1246025
- Added to list: 23 December 1998

Other information
- External links: Departures; Facilities
- Coordinates: 51.4562°N 0.0192°W

Ladywell railway station is in Ladywell, in the London Borough of Lewisham in south east London, in London fare zone 3. It is 6 miles 62 chains (10.9 km) measured from London Charing Cross.

The station and all trains serving it are operated by Southeastern. The Grade II station opened in 1857 and is in Ladywell Fields, adjacent to University Hospital, Lewisham.

== History ==
=== Early years (1857-1922) ===
The Mid-Kent line was built by the Mid-Kent and North Kent Junction Railway (MK&NKJR) and was opened on 1 January 1857 as far as Beckenham Junction (although it was not technically a junction as the West End of London and Crystal Palace Railway's line did not open until 3 May 1858). From opening the line was worked by the South Eastern Railway (SER). Seven years later the MK&NKJR built an extension from a new junction station at New Beckenham to Croydon (Addiscombe Road) which again was operated by the SER.

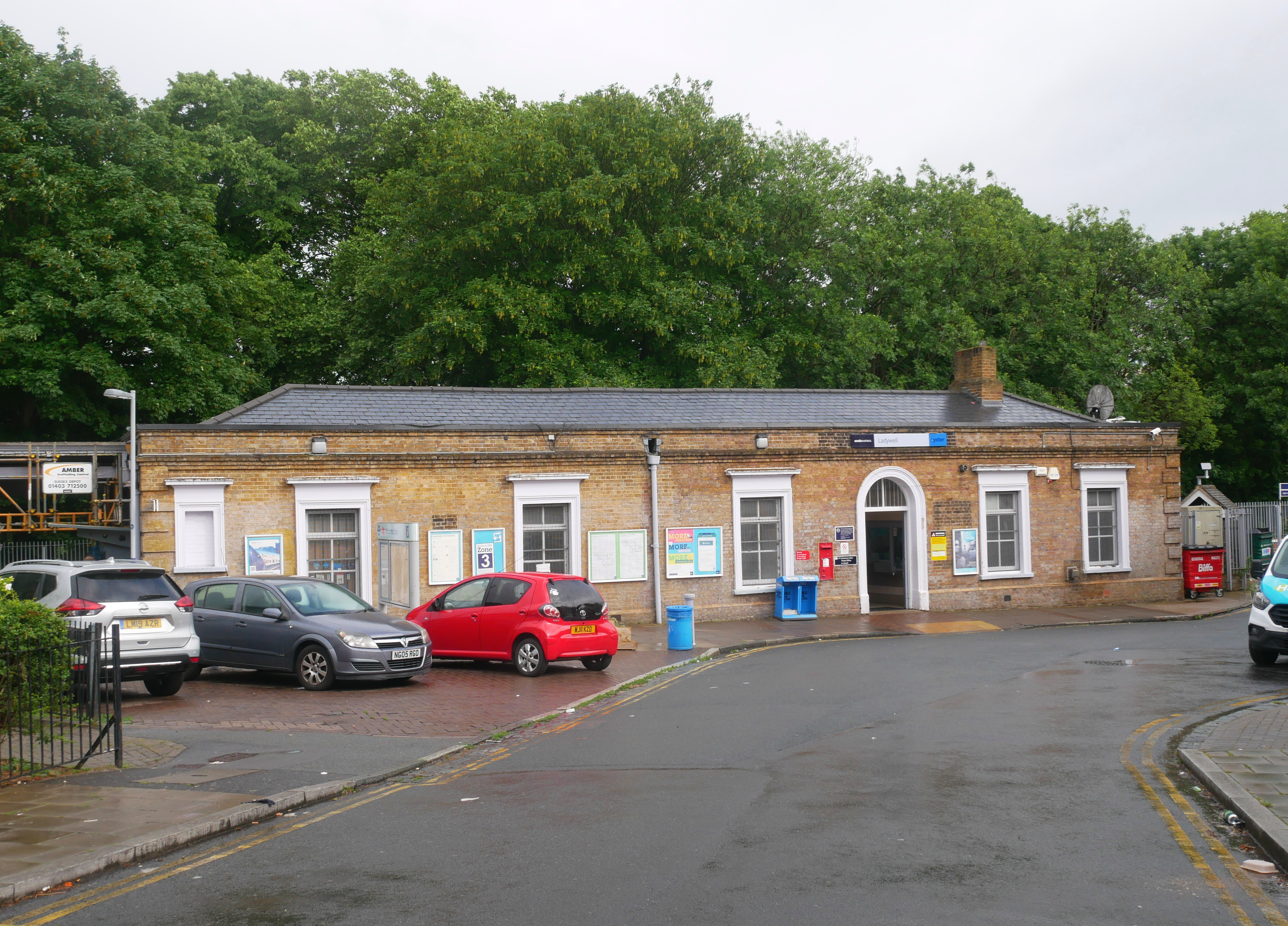
The northwest exterior of the Grade II listed station

In September 1866 a spur was opened from the north end of Ladywell station to the recently opened main line (which avoided Lewisham Junction station) which it joins at Parks Bridge Junction.

Almost all services from the station have terminated at Charing Cross or Cannon Street stations but between 1880 and 1884 a service worked between Croydon (Addiscombe Road) calling all stations to New Cross and then via a connection to the East London Line and terminating at Liverpool Street station.

In 1898 the South Eastern Railway and its bitter rivals the London Chatham and Dover Railway agreed to work as one railway company under the name of the South Eastern and Chatham Railway and Ladywell became an SECR station.

=== Southern Railway (1923-1947) ===
Following the Railways Act 1921 (also known as the Grouping Act), Ladywell station became a Southern Railway station on 1 January 1923.

The Mid-Kent line was electrified with the (750 V DC third rail) system and electric services commenced on 28 February 1926. Early electric services were worked by early Southern Railway 3-car Electric Multiple Unit trains often built from old SECR carriages.

On 30 June 1929 colour light signalling was introduced north of Ladywell.

=== British Railways (1948-1994) ===
After World War II and following nationalisation on 1 January 1948, the station fell under the auspices of British Railways Southern Region.

Colour light signalling was introduced south of Ladywell (as far as New Beckenham) on 4 April 1971.

=== The privatisation era (1994-present day) ===
On 13 October 1996 operation of the passenger services passed to Connex South Eastern. Services were subsequently operated by South Eastern Trains, and Southeastern since 1 April 2006.

== Service ==
All services at Ladywell are operated by Southeastern using Class 376, 465, 466 and 707 EMUs.

The typical off-peak service in trains per hour is:

- 4 tph to London Charing Cross (2 of these run non-stop to and from London Bridge and 2 call at Lewisham)
- 4 tph to Hayes

On Sundays, the station is served by a half-hourly service between Hayes and London Charing Cross via Lewisham.

| Preceding station | National Rail | Following station |
|---|---|---|
| London Bridge | Southeastern Hayes Line | Catford Bridge |
| Lewisham | Southeastern Hayes Line | Catford Bridge |

== Connections ==
London Buses routes 122, 284, 484 and P4 serve the station.
