= Mid Kent Railway =

The Mid Kent and North Kent Junction Railway (usually referred to as the MK&NKJR or Mid Kent Railway (Note: The name is given both with and without the hyphen in different sources.)) was an early railway in Kent England. Mid Kent Railway also refers to separate railway built nearby in Bromley.

== History ==
=== Origins ===
Mid Kent Railway Act 1855
- Act of Parliament
- Parliament of the United Kingdom
- Long title: An Act for making Railways from the Farnborough Extension of the West London and Crystal Palace Railway to the North Kent Line of the South-eastern Railway, and to the London, Brighton, and South Coast Railway, with Branches therefrom; and for other Purposes.
- Citation: 18 & 19 Vict. c. clxix

Dates
- Royal assent: 23 July 1855

Text of statute as originally enacted

The Mid Kent Railway was formed by the Mid Kent Railway Act 1855 (18 & 19 Vict. c. clxix) on 23 July 1855 to construct a 4.75-mile line between the South Eastern Railway (SER) at Lewisham and the Farnborough Extension of the West End of London and Crystal Palace Railway (WEL&CPR) at Beckenham, later renamed Beckenham Junction. The intention then was to extend this line to Croydon at a later date. The line opened 1 January 1857 and was operated by the SER under a ten-year agreement.

=== Addiscombe Line ===
Mid Kent (Addiscombe) Railway Act 1862
- Act of Parliament
- Parliament of the United Kingdom
- Long title: An Act to authorize the Mid Kent Railway Company to make a Railway from the Mid Kent Railway to Addiscombe; and for other Purposes.
- Citation: 25 & 26 Vict. c. cliii

Dates
- Royal assent: 17 July 1862

Text of statute as originally enacted

Although the company later abandoned its intention of building a line to Croydon, an extension to "Croydon (Addiscombe Road)" from New Beckenham through Elmers End and Woodside was completed in 1862 which was also leased to the SER on completion.

=== Dissolution ===
South-eastern Railway (Mid-Kent) Act 1864
- Act of Parliament
- Parliament of the United Kingdom
- Long title: An Act for the Amalgamation of the Mid-Kent Railway Company, and their Undertaking, Railway, and Property, with the South-eastern Railway Company, and their Undertaking, Railway, and Property; and for other Purposes.
- Citation: 27 & 28 Vict. c. cccxi

Dates
- Royal assent: 29 July 1864

Other legislation
- Amended by: South-eastern Railway (Mid Kent Amalgamation Completion) Act 1866

Text of statute as originally enacted

South-eastern Railway (Mid Kent Amalgamation Completion) Act 1866
- Act of Parliament
- Parliament of the United Kingdom
- Long title: An Act for facilitating the carrying into effect of the Act for the Amalgamation of the Undertaking of the Mid-Kent Railway Company with the Undertaking of the Southeastern Railway Company.
- Citation: 29 & 30 Vict. c. ccxxxv

Dates
- Royal assent: 16 July 1866

Other legislation
- Amends: South-eastern Railway (Mid-Kent) Act 1864

Text of statute as originally enacted

The remaining interests of the company were taken over by the SER in August 1866 under the South-eastern Railway (Mid-Kent) Act 1864 (27 & 28 Vict. c. cccxi) and the South-eastern Railway (Mid Kent Amalgamation Completion) Act 1866 (29 & 30 Vict. c. ccxxxv).

=== After the MK&NKJR ===
The Elmers End—Hayes section of the current Mid-Kent line was built by the West Wickham and Hayes Railway, but was sold to the SER in 1881, opening on 29 May 1882.

On 1 June 1997, Woodside and Addiscombe station were closed, with the final train running the day before.

== The Crays Company ==
Mid-Kent Railway (Bromley to Saint Mary Cray) Act 1856
- Act of Parliament
- Parliament of the United Kingdom
- Long title: An Act for making a Railway from the authorized line of the West End of London and Crystal Palace Railway (Extension to Bromley and Farnborough) at Shortlands in the Parish of Beckenham in the County of Kent to Saint Mary Cray in the same County.
- Citation: 19 & 20 Vict. c. cxxv

Dates
- Royal assent: 21 July 1856

Text of statute as originally enacted

Mid-Kent Railway (Bromley to Saint Mary Cray) Act 1856 (19 & 20 Vict. c. cxxv) was passed authorising the Mid-Kent Railway (Bromley to Saint Mary Cray) Company (MK(B&SMC)R) to construct a 4 mile line between the WEL&CPR terminus at Bromley (now Shortlands station) and St Mary Cray. The MK(B&SMC)R was commonly called The Crays Company.

- A Railway commencing in the Parish of Beckenham in the County of Kent by a Junction with the Line authorized by "The West End of London and Crystal Palace Railway (Extension to Farnborough) Act, 1854," at or near a Point where the said Line crosses the High Road from Bromley to Beckenham at Shortlands, numbered 127 in the said Parish of Beckenham in the Plans and Book of Reference of the said Line deposited with the Clerk of the Peace for the County of Kent, and referred to in the said Act, and terminating in or near to a Field numbered 8 upon the deposited Plans of the proposed Railway in the Parish of St. Mary Cray in the County of Kent.
— Section 20, Mid-Kent Railway (Bromley to Saint Mary Cray) Act 1856 (19 & 20 Vict. c. cxxv)

It was assumed that the Crays line would be operated by the SER in conjunction with the Lewisham to Beckenham line, and eventually acquired by them. But the shareholders heard that the SER was planning a competing line and transferred their allegiance to the East Kent Railway (EKR). After negotiation with the EKR, the Crays Company only built the line from the WEL&CPR at Bromley to Southborough Road (now Bickley station), completing it in 1858. St Mary Cray to Southborough Road was built by the EKR as part of their Western Extension from Strood.

Mid Kent Railway (Bromley to St. Mary's Cray) Leasing and Transfer Act 1862
- Act of Parliament
- Parliament of the United Kingdom
- Long title: An Act for a Lease of the Undertaking of the Mid Kent Railway (Bromley to Saint Mary's Cray) Company to the London, Chatham, and Dover Railway Company, and for other Purposes.
- Citation: 25 & 26 Vict. c. ccxxiv

Dates
- Royal assent: 7 August 1862

The Crays line was leased to the London, Chatham and Dover Railway (LC&DR, successor to the EKR) by the Mid Kent Railway (Bromley to St. Mary's Cray) Leasing and Transfer Act 1862 (25 & 26 Vict. c. ccxxiv).

Despite the similarity of name, the Mid Kent and North Kent Junction Railway and the Mid-Kent (Bromley and St Mary Cray) Railway remained separate and independent until absorbed by the SER and LC&DR respectively.

== Legacy ==
The Lewisham—Elmers End and the Shortlands—St Mary Cray sections now form parts of the Hayes line and the Chatham Main Line, respectively.
