= Hayes railway station =

National Rail station in London, England

Hayes
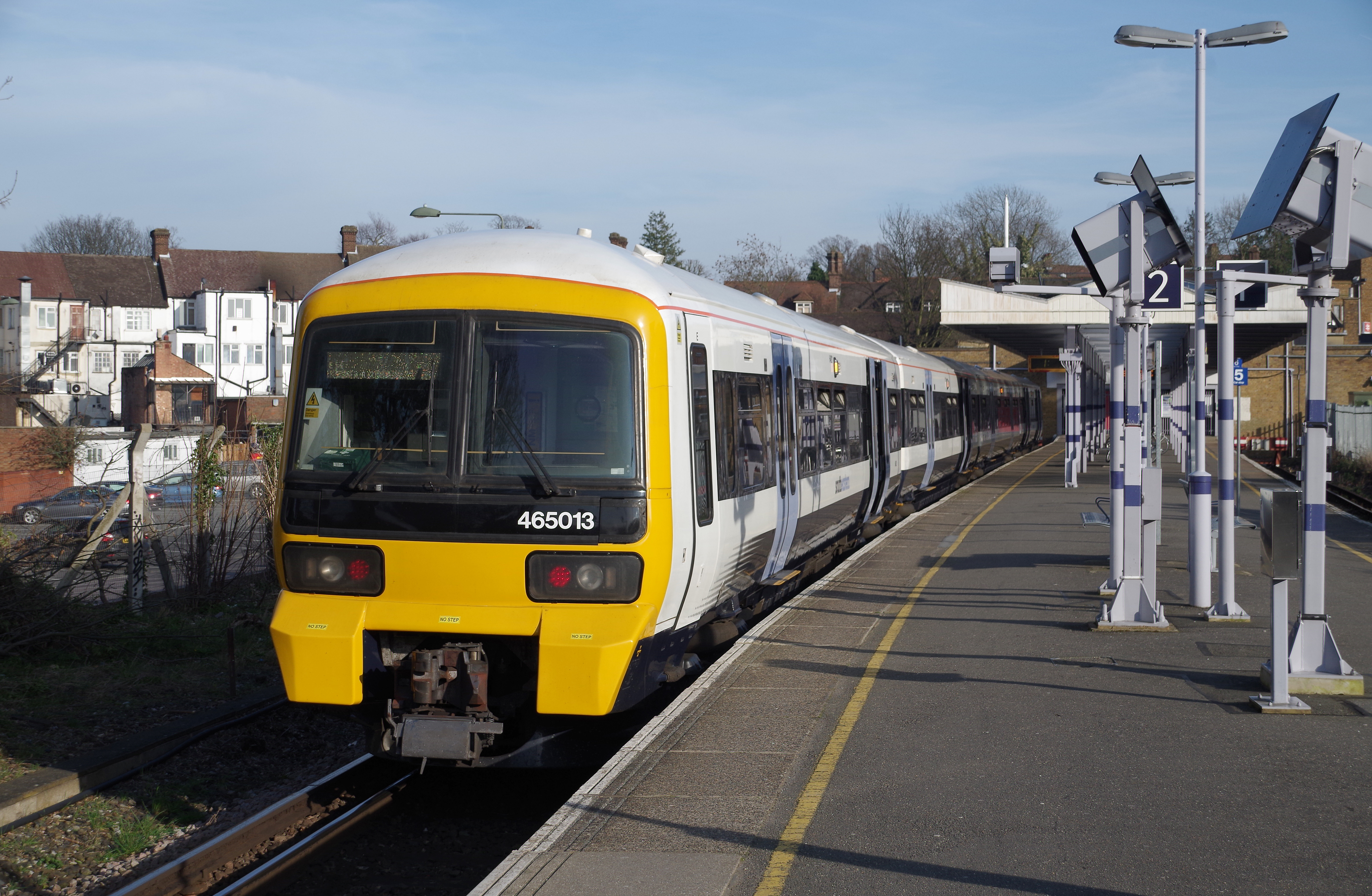
- Interactive map of Hayes

General information
- Location: Hayes
- Local authority: London Borough of Bromley
- Grid reference: TQ400661
- Managed by: Southeastern
- Station code: HYS
- DfT category: D
- Number of platforms: 2
- Accessible: Yes
- Fare zone: 5

National Rail annual entry and exit
- 2020–21: ▼0.208 million
- 2021–22: ▲0.534 million
- 2022–23: ▲0.691 million
- 2023–24: ▲0.855 million
- 2024–25: ▲0.940 million

Key dates
- 29 May 1882: Opened
- 21 September 1925: Electrification
- 1933: Rebuilt
- 15 September 1940: Bombed
- 1956: Rebuilt

Other information
- External links: Departures; Facilities
- Coordinates: 51.3765°N 0.0102°E

Hayes railway station serves the suburban area of Hayes, in the London Borough of Bromley, south east London, England. It lies 14 miles 32 chains (23.2 km) from London Charing Cross.

The main entrance is in the centre of a shopping arcade on Station Approach, with a secondary entrance from the car park on Old Station Yard.

The station is served by Southeastern services from Charing Cross and forms the suburban terminus for trains on the Mid-Kent line. To avoid confusion with Hayes & Harlington, the station is referred to as Hayes (Kent) on most timetables, although since 1965 the station itself has not been located in Kent.

== History ==
=== Opening and early years (1882-1923) ===
The Mid-Kent line was built by the Mid Kent and North Kent Junction and was operated on opening as far as Beckenham Junction on 1 January 1857 by the South Eastern Railway (SER). The line was extended to Addiscombe in 1864 and Elmers End (the future junction for the Hayes branch) was opened that year.

The Hayes branch line from Elmers End was built by the West Wickham & Hayes Railway, but was sold to the South Eastern Railway on the opening day, 29 May 1882. Initially the 13 weekday and four Sunday services operated as far as Elmers End where they connected with Addiscombe to London trains. The initial layout at Hayes consisted of a single platform with a locomotive turntable at the far end. A goods yard was provided on the south side of the station and a 33-lever signal box was provided.

In 1898, the South Eastern Railway and the London Chatham and Dover Railway agreed to work as one railway company under the name of the South Eastern and Chatham Railway and Hayes became a SE&CR station.

By 1912, services had increased to 15 each way but only two of these actually operated through to London; the rest terminated at Elmers End. In 1909, however, the 8:37 a.m. Hayes - Charing Cross service was formed of Continental boat train stock where, on arrival, it was used to work the 10:00 a.m. Charing Cross - Folkestone boat train.

=== Southern Railway (1923-1947) ===
Following the Railways Act 1921 (also known as the Grouping Act), Hayes became a Southern Railway station on 1 January 1923.

The early single-storey, clapboard building was enough for the initial demand in an area of London that saw urbanisation relatively late. Usage remained low until electrification was completed in 1925 with electric services commencing on 21 September that year. As suburban development gained pace, the station was modernised in 1933 with shops being incorporated into the entrance and the goods yard extended in anticipation of more coal traffic. On the night of 15/16 September 1940, the station building was badly damaged by a bomb and subsequently repaired in 1956.

=== British Railways (1948-1994) ===
On 1 January 1948, following nationalisation of the railways, Hayes became part of British Railways Southern Region.

The goods yard closed on 19 April 1965, although the station continued to handle greyhound dogs travelling between Catford and training kennels in Ireland.

During the 1960s, passenger numbers fell as many commuters were driving to Bromley South and Beckenham Junction to take advantage of faster services.

Upon sectorisation in 1982, London & South East (renamed Network SouthEast in 1986) operated commuter services in the London area.

=== The privatisation era (1994-Present Day) ===
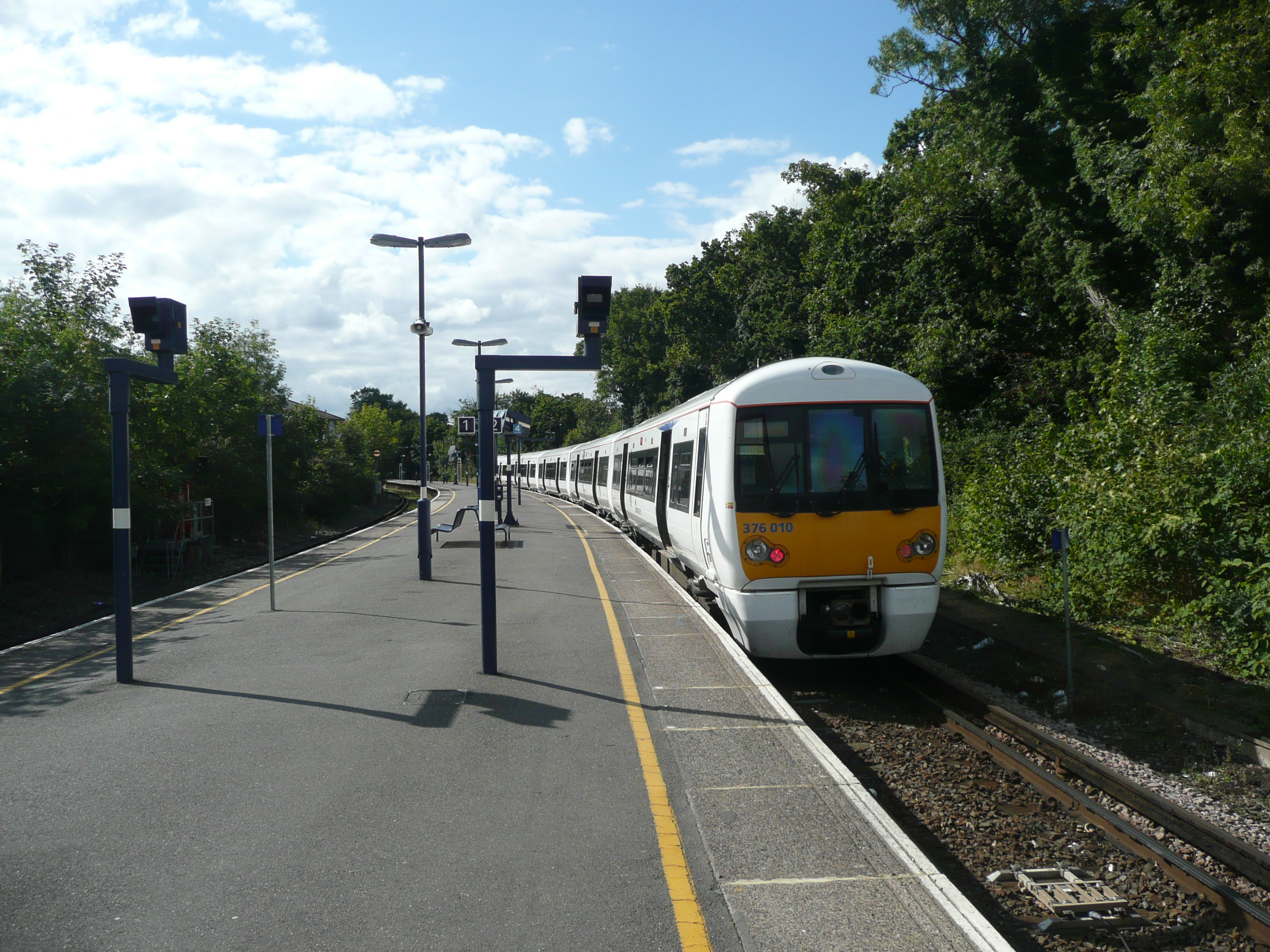
Electrostar unit at Hayes station

Following privatisation of British Rail on 1 April 1994, the infrastructure at Hayes station became the responsibility of Railtrack whilst a business unit operated the train services. On 13 October 1996, operation of the passenger services passed to Connex South Eastern who were originally due to run the franchise until 2011.

In 2004, the Strategic Rail Authority proposed withdrawing services to Charing Cross from the Hayes Line. Following a campaign led by local Councillors and the Hayes Village Association, the plans were withdrawn.

== Transport for London proposal ==
In 2014, Transport for London began investigating a possible extension of the Bakerloo line from Elephant & Castle tube station through Southwark towards Lewisham, Bromley and Hayes. One of the options involves the Bakerloo line extension replacing the existing National Rail line between Lewisham and Hayes.

== Services ==
All services at Hayes are operated by Southeastern using Class 376, 465, 466 and 707 electric multiple units.

The typical off-peak service is four trains per hour to London Charing Cross; two of these run non-stop between Ladywell and London Bridge and two call at Lewisham. On Sundays, the station is served by a half-hourly service to London Charing Cross via Lewisham.

Preceding station	National Rail	Following station
West Wickham	Southeastern Hayes Line	Terminus

== Connections ==
London Buses routes 119, 138, 246, 314, 353 and 638 serve the station.
