= Manning =

Manning (also Mannion, Ma(i)nnin) is a family name.

== Origin and meaning ==
Manning is from an old Norse word — manningi — meaning a brave or valiant man; and one of the first forms of the name was Mannin; another cartography was Mannygn. One historian gives a Saxon origin for the family, which he calls "ancient and noble". According to him, Manning was the name of a town in Saxony, and from it the surname sprang.

Other historians make Mannheim, Germany, the cradle of the family, and begin its history with Ranulph, or Rudolph de Manning, Count Palatine, who, having married Elgida, aunt to King Harold I of England, had a grant of land in Kent, England. His name is also written de Mannheim — Rudolph de Mannheim. His place in Kent was Downe Court, and there the Mannings have been a power ever since. Simon de Manning, a grandson of Rudolph, was the first of the English barons to take up the cross and go forth to the Holy Wars. He was a companion of King Richard I of England, and was knighted on the battlefield. He was Lord of the Manor of Kevington, and the area now called Berry's Green. We can easily see where the cross of the coat of arms comes from. At Downe Court these arms are seen graven upon tombstones of the Mannings. By the thirteenth century the family was well represented in over a score of countries and several towns bear their name — Manningham, Bradford, and Mannington, Norfolk. The surname Manning is also an English patronymic name, being one of those names derived from the first name of a father. In this case it is derived from the old English personal name Manning and simply denotes 'son of Manning', while Manning itself may derive from the old Norse name Menning, meaning 'able'.

Early recorded English instances of the name includes a reference to one Mannicus in the Domesday Book of 1086 and Algarus Manningestepsune in 1130, mentioned in Ekwall's "Early London Personal Names". Seaman Lilius Manning appears in the Pipe Rolls for Essex in 1181 and Ainulf Manning in the Pipe Rolls for Kent in 1190.

The surname Manning is on the record in Ireland from the seventeenth century and is most numerous today in counties Cork, Dublin, Roscommon, Mayo, and Galway. Although it is essentially an English surname, Manning has occasionally been used as a synonym of the Gaelic surname Ó Mainnín and that, for example, Cornet John Manning of O'Neill's dragons in King James II's Irish army, was an Ó Mainnín.

Others trace the origins of the name to Ireland: Ó Mainnín (anglicized Mannion) is the name of a Galway family who were formerly chiefs of Soghain (in what is now Ireland), a district nearly co-extensive with the barony of Tiaquin. Ó Mainnín, King of Soghain, is mentioned in the Chronicon Scotorum in the year 1135, and a latter chief died at the Second Battle of Athenry in 1316. According to historian C. Thomas Cairney, the O'Mannins were chiefs of the Soghain tribe and that the Soghain tribe came from the Cruthin tribe who were the first Celts to settle in Ireland from 800 to 500 BC.

The Mannings continued to form a distinct clan down to the time of James I of England. The chief resided at Menlough Castle, in the parish of Killascobe, Galway. In 1617, Aedh Ó Mainnín (Hugh O'Mannin) surrendered his estates, but a small portion was restored under the Act of Settlement in 1676. The name is still common in Galway and Roscommon, and has spread into other parts of Ireland.

== People ==
=== A ===
- Aaron Manning (born 1961), American football player
- Adelaide Manning (1828–1905), British writer and editor
- Aileen Manning (1886–1946), American film actress
- Al Manning (born 1982), Australian rugby union player
- Al G. Manning (1927–2006), American occultist
- Alan Manning (born 1960), British economist
- Alexander Manning (1819–1903), Canadian businessman and Mayor of Toronto
- Alfred Manning, British footballer
- Amanda-Jane Manning (born 1979), English actress, singer and recording artist
- Amos R. Manning (1810–1880), American judge
- Andrew Manning (born 1966), Australian rules footballer
- Anna Manning, Canadian insurance executive
- Anne Manning (novelist) (1807–1879), English novelist
- Anne Manning (racewalker) (born 1959), Australian racewalker
- Anita Manning (born 1947), Scottish antiques expert
- Anthony Manning (born 1992), American soccer player
- Arch Manning (born 2004), American football quarterback
- Archie Manning (born 1949), American football player
- Arthur Manning (1872–1947), Australian politician
- Aubrey Manning (1930–2018), English zoologist and broadcaster

=== B ===
- Barbara Manning (born 1964), American indie rock musician
- Bayless Manning (1923–2011), American jurist and academic, corporate law expert
- Bernard Manning (1930–2007), British comedian
- Bernard Manning (singer) (c.1886–1962), in England and Australia
- Bernard Lord Manning (1892–1941), British historian
- Bill Manning (born 1965), American sports executive
- Blaine Manning (born 1979), Canadian indoor lacrosse player
- Blanche M. Manning (1934–2020), American judge
- Bob Manning (soul singer) (born 1945), American singer
- Bob Manning (pop singer) (1926–1997), American singer popular in the 1950s
- Bob Manning (musician), British musician
- Bob Manning (mayor) (born 1945), mayor of the Cairns Regional Council, Queensland, Australia
- Brandon Manning (born 1990), Canadian ice hockey player
- Brennan Manning, born Richard Francis Xavier Manning, (1934–2013), American author of The Ragamuffin Gospel
- Brian Manning (historian) (1927–2004), British historian
- Brian G. W. Manning (1926–2011), British astronomer
- Brian Manning (American football) (born 1975), American football player
- Brian Manning (trade unionist and activist) (1932–2013), Australian activist
- Brian Manning (politician), Trinidad and Tobago politician
- Bruce Manning (1902–1965), American filmmaker and screenwriter
- Bruce A. Manning, environmental chemist

=== C ===
- Caroline Joyce Manning (1909–2000), British campaigner
- Catherine Manning, British writer of mystery novels under the pseudonym Elizabeth Ironside
- Catherine Lemmon Manning (1881–1957), American philatelist
- Cecil Manning (1892–1985), British politician
- Chandra Manning, American historian
- Charles Manning (academic) (1894–1978), South African international relations academic
- Charles Manning (rugby league), New Zealand rugby league footballer
- Charlie Manning (born 1979), American baseball pitcher
- Charlotte Manning (1803–1871), British feminist, scholar and writer
- Chelsea Manning (born 1987), American intelligence analyst convicted of leaking classified materials
- Christopher D. Manning (born 1965), American computer scientist and applied linguist
- Clarence Manning (1893–1972), American Slavicist
- Clark Manning (born 1959), American actuary and business manager
- Colin Manning, American press secretary
- Craig E. Manning, American geologist and geochemist
- Craig Nevill-Manning, New Zealand computer scientist
- Curtis Manning (lacrosse) (born 1987), Canadian box lacrosse player

=== D ===
- Dane Manning (born 1989), British rugby league footballer
- Danieal Manning (born 1982), American football player
- Daniel Manning (1831–1887), American journalist, banker, and politician, Secretary of the Treasury under Cleveland
- Danny Manning (born 1966), American basketball player and coach
- Darren Manning (born 1975), British motor racing driver
- David Manning (baseball) (born 1972), American baseball pitcher
- David Manning (cricketer) (born 1963), English cricketer
- David Franklin Manning (1857–1929), justice of the New York Supreme Court
- Dave Manning (rugby league) (1910−1979), Australian rugby league player
- David Manning (police officer), police commissioner in Papua New Guinea
- D. J. Manning (David John Manning, 1938–2014), British academic
- Dayna Manning (born 1978), Canadian singer-songwriter and producer
- Deborah Manning, New Zealand lawyer and charity founder
- Dick Manning (1912–1991), American songwriter
- Don Manning (born c.1946), American football player
- Don Manning (politician) (1965–2020), American politician
- Dorothy Manning (1919–2012), New Zealand artist

=== E ===
- Ed Manning (1944–2011), American basketball player
- Edgar Manning (1889/9090–1931), Jamaican jazz musician and criminal
- Edna Manning (born 1942), president of the Oklahoma School of Science and Mathematics
- Edward Manning (Jamaica) (18th century), Jamaican politician
- Edye Rolleston Manning (1889–1957), Australian-born officer of the Royal Air Force
- Eleanor Manning (1906–1986), Australian Women's Army Service officer
- Eli Manning (born 1981), American football player
- Elias James Manning (1938–2019), American-born Brazilian Catholic bishop
- Ella Manning (1906–2007), Canadian nurse, Arctic explorer, writer and naturalist
- Emily Manning (1845–1890), Australian journalist and writer
- Erin Manning (theorist) (born 1969), Canadian cultural theorist and political philosopher
- Ernest Manning (1908–1996), Canadian politician
- Ernie Manning (1890–1973), American baseball pitcher
- Ethan Manning, American politician and businessman
- Ethelwyn Manning (1885–1972), American librarian

=== F ===
- Fabian Manning (born 1964), Canadian politician
- Felix Manning (baseball) (1909–1982), American baseball player
- Frankie Manning (1914–2009), American dancer
- Fred M. Manning (died 1958), American oil developer
- Frederic Manning (1882–1935), Australian poet and novelist
- Frederick Norton Manning (1839–1903), medical practitioner and military surgeon in New South Wales

=== G ===
- Gayle Manning (born 1950), American politician from Ohio
- Geoff Manning (1926–2018), South Australian historian
- George Manning (New Zealand politician) (1887–1976), Mayor of Christchurch
- George T. Manning (1908–1956), American politician
- Gordon Manning (1917–2006), American news executive
- Gustav Randolph Manning (1873–1953), German-American businessman and sports coach
- Guy Manning, British musician
- Guy Manning (basketball) (born 1944), American basketball player
- Gwyn Manning (1915–2003), Welsh amateur footballer

=== H ===
- Harold Manning (1909–2003), American long-distance runner
- Harry Manning (1897–1974), American master mariner, aviator and officer of the United States Navy Reserve
- Harvey Manning (1925–2006), American author and hiking advocate
- Haydon Manning (born c.1958), Australian political scientist, son of Geoff Manning
- Hazel Manning, Trinidad and Tobago politician
- Helen Manning (1919–2008), Native American historian and writer
- Helen Taft Manning (1891–1987), American historian
- Henry Manning (spy), spy in the exiled court of Charles II at Cologne and Brussels
- Henry Manning (politician) (1877–1963), Australian lawyer and politician
- Henry Edward Manning (1808–1892), English Roman Catholic Archbishop of Westminster
- Henry J. Manning (1859–?), U.S. Navy sailor and Medal of Honor recipient
- Hugh Manning (1920–2004), British actor

=== I ===
- Ilm Manning (born 1999), American football player
- Irene Manning (1912–2004), American actress and singer
- Iven Manning (1918–1988), Australian politician

=== J ===
- Jack Manning (baseball) (1853–1929), American baseball player
- Jack Manning (footballer) (1886–1946), English footballer
- Jack Manning (actor) (1916–2009), American actor
- Jack Manning (cricketer) (1923–1988), Australian cricketer
- Jack Manning (architect) (1929–2021), New Zealand architect
- Jacob Merrill Manning (1824–1882), American Congregational clergyman
- James Manning Jr., American army veteran and politician
- James Manning (minister) (1738–1791), American Baptist minister and first president of Brown University
- James Manning (lawyer) (1781–1866), English barrister, serjeant-at-law, and law writer
- James Manning (scientist) (1917–1989), surgeon, pathologist and public health administrator
- James Manning (architect), English-born architect and builder, active in Perth, Western Australia
- James David Manning (born 1947), American pastor
- James Hilton Manning (1854–1925), American newspaper publisher, businessman and mayor of Albany
- James S. Manning (1859–1938), Associate Justice of the North Carolina Supreme Court
- J. L. Manning (James Lionel Manning), British sports columnist
- Jane Manning (1938–2021), English soprano singer
- Jeff Manning, American voice actor and narrator
- Jeremy Manning (born 1985), New Zealand rugby union footballer
- Jeffrey Manning (died 2004), American county prosecutor and politician
- Jessie Wilson Manning (1855–1947), American author and lecturer
- Jim Manning (baseball, born 1862) (1862–1929), American baseball player and manager
- Jim Manning (pitcher) (1943–2020), American baseball pitcher
- Jo Manning (1923–2022), Canadian etcher, painter and author
- Jo Mary Manning, New Zealand academic
- Joan Manning-Sanders (1913–2002), British artist
- Joanna Manning (born 1943), British-Canadian feminist activist and Anglican priest
- Joanne Manning, American laser scientist
- John Manning, co-founder of the Atlantic Brass Quintet
- John Manning Jr. (1830–1899), U.S. Representative from North Carolina
- John Manning (footballer) (1940–2021), English football player
- John Manning (journalist) (died 1868), New Zealand newspaper editor
- John Manning (rugby league) (born 1978), Australian rugby league footballer and actor
- John Manning (rugby union) (born c.1880), Australian rugby union player
- John B. Manning (1833–1908), American businessman and mayor of Buffalo, New York
- John Charles Manning (born 1962), South African botanist
- John Edmondson Manning (1848–1910), English Unitarian minister
- John E. Manning, American politician
- John F. Manning (born 1961), Harvard Law School professor
- John H. Manning (1889–1963), American lawyer and government official
- John J. Manning (1842–1911), American frontiersman and lawman
- John J. Manning (unionist) (1868–1934), American labor union leader
- John Lawrence Manning (1816–1889), Governor of South Carolina, 1852–1854
- John Ruel Manning (1897–1939), American chemist and technologist
- J. Fred Manning (1875–1955), Massachusetts politician
- Joseph Manning (historian) (born 1959), American historian
- Joseph P. Manning (Washington politician) (1827–1916), American pioneer who crossed the Oregon Trail in 1848
- Joseph S. Manning (1845–1905), American Medal of Honor recipient
- Judy Manning (born 1942), American politician from Georgia
- Judy Manning (lawyer) (born 1978), Canadian lawyer
- Julia Manning (born 1951), English footballer
- Julie Manning (born 1939), Tanzanian lawyer, judge and politician

=== K ===
- Kathleen Lockhart Manning (1890–1951), American composer
- Kathy Manning (born 1956), American lawyer and politician
- Katy Manning (born 1949), British actress
- Kenneth Manning (born 1947), American academic
- Kerryn Manning (born 1976), Australian harness racer
- Kevin Manning (bishop) (1933–2024), Australian Roman Catholic bishop
- Kevin Manning (jockey) (born 1967), Irish jockey
- Kevin J. Manning (born 1944), American college head
- Kim Manning (born 1960), American TV presenter, actress and dancer
- Kimberly D. Manning, American physician
- Knox Manning (1904–1980), American film actor

=== L ===
- Larry Manning (1942–2012), American stock car racing driver
- Lauren Manning (born 1961), American author and entrepreneur
- Laurence Manning (1899–1972), Canadian science fiction author
- Leah Manning (1886–1977), British educationalist, social reformer and politician
- Lee Mary Manning (born 1972), American photographer and artist
- Leonard Manning (1975–2000), New Zealand soldier and United Nations peacekeeper killed in East Timor
- Levi Manning (1864–1935), American politician, Mayor of Tucson, Arizona
- Liam Manning (born 1985), English football manager and coach
- Lynn Manning (1955–2015), American Paralympian, writer and actor

=== M ===
- Madeline Manning (born 1948), American runner
- Margaret Manning (died 1984), American journalist
- Marie Manning (murderer) (died 1849), Swiss murderer
- Marie Manning (writer) (1872–1945), American newspaper columnist and novelist
- M. Joseph Manning (1924–2015), American politician
- M. Lisa Manning (born 1980), American physicist
- Marty Manning (1916–1971), American arranger and conductor of popular music
- Mary Manning (artist) (1853–1930), Irish landscape painter and teacher
- Mary Manning (writer) (1905–1999), Irish novelist, playwright and film critic
- Mary Fryer Manning (1844–1928), American social leader
- Matt Manning (born 1998), American baseball player
- Matt Manning (rugby league) (born 1974), Australian rugby league footballer
- Matthew Manning (born 1955), British author and healer
- Maurice Manning (born 1943), Irish politician
- Maurice Manning (poet) (born 1966), American poet
- Max Manning (1918–2003), American baseball pitcher
- Michael Manning (priest) (1940–2016), American Roman Catholic priest
- Michael Manning (murderer) (1929–1954), last person to be executed in the Republic of Ireland
- Michael Manning (fetish artist) (born 1963), American fetish artist and animator
- Michael J. Manning (1943–2008), Papua New Guinean activist
- Michelle Manning, American film and television director and producer
- Mick Manning (born 1959), British children's author and illustrator
- Mike Manning (actor) (born 1987), American activist and actor
- Mildred Manning, American film actress
- Montana Manning, British actress and singer

=== N ===
- Nathan Manning (born 1982), American politician from Ohio
- Ned Manning (born 1950), Australian playwright, actor and teacher
- Nelson H. Manning (1832–?), American politician
- Nick Manning (born 1967), American porn star

=== O ===
- Olivia Manning (1908–1980), British novelist, poet, writer, and reviewer
- Orlando H. Manning (1847–1909), American politician
- Owen Manning (1721–1801) English clergyman, antiquarian and historian

=== P ===
- Padraig Gearr Ó Mannin (fl. 1798), United Irishman
- Patrick Manning (1946–2016), Prime Minister of Trinidad and Tobago
- Patrick Manning (historian) (born 1941), American politician
- Patrick Manning (rower) (born 1967), American rower
- Patrick R. Manning (born 1965), American politician from New York State
- Paul Manning (police officer, born 1947), British police officer, Assistant Commissioner of Police of the Metropolisr
- Paul Manning (police officer, born 1973), British-born Canadian undercover police officer
- Paul Manning (cyclist) (born 1974), British track and road racing cyclist
- Paul Manning (cricketer) (born 1990), Caymanian cricketer
- Paul Manning (journalist) (died 1995), American broadcast journalist
- Paul Manning (ice hockey) (born 1979), Canadian ice hockey player
- Paul Manning (TV producer) (1959–2005), American television producer
- Percy Manning (1870–1917), British antiquarian, folklorist and archaeologist
- Peter Manning (conductor) (born 1956), British conductor and violinist
- Peter Manning (footballer) (born 1946), Australian rules footballer
- Peter K. Manning (born 1940), American sociologist
- Pete Manning (gridiron football) (1937–2019), American and Canadian football player
- Peyton Manning (born 1976), American football player
- Phil Manning (footballer) (1906–1930), Australian rules footballer
- Phil Manning (musician) (born 1948), Australian blues musician
- Philipp Manning (1869–1951), British-German actor
- Preston Manning (born 1942), Canadian politician and son of Ernest Manning

=== R ===
- Randolph Manning (1804–1864), American jurist
- Raymond B. Manning (1934–2000), American carcinologist
- Reg Manning (1905–1986), American artist and illustrator
- Reginald Kerr Manning (1866–1943), Australian barrister
- Rich Manning (born 1970), American basketball player
- Richard Manning (born 1951), American environmental author and journalist
- Richard C. Manning, Australian development expert
- Richard Irvine Manning I (1789–1836), Governor of South Carolina from 1824 to 1826
- Richard Irvine Manning III (1859–1931), American politician
- Richard F. Manning (born 1966), New Zealand academic and Treaty of Waitangi educator
- Rick Manning (born 1954), American baseball player and broadcaster
- Ricky Manning (born 1980), American football player and coach
- Robert Manning (engineer) (1816–1897), Irish engineer
- Robert Manning (journalist) (1919–2012), American journalist
- Robert Manning (priest) (1655–1731), Roman Catholic priest
- Robert D. Manning (born 1957), American economist and financial adviser
- Robert Manning (politician) (1927–2006), member of the Ohio House of Representatives
- Roger Manning, American singer-songwriter
- Roger Joseph Manning, Jr. (born 1966), American keyboardist
- Ron Manning (1937–2012), Canadian curler
- Ronan Manning (born 2000), Irish soccer player
- Rosemary Manning (1911–1988), British writer
- Rosie Manning (born 1950), American football player
- Roy Manning (born 1981), American football player and coach
- Rube Manning (1883–1930), American baseball pitcher
- Russ Manning (1929–1981), American comic book artist
- Russell Manning (born 1945), Australian rugby union player
- Ruth Manning-Sanders (1886–1988), English poet and author
- Ryan Manning (born 1996), Irish soccer player

=== S ===
- ShaChelle Devlin Manning, American businessperson
- Sam Manning (musician) (c.1898–1960), Trinidadian calypsonian
- Samuel Manning (1841–1933), New Zealand brewer and Mayor of Christchurch
- Sarra Manning, English writer and journalist
- Sasha Johnson Manning (born 1963), English composer
- Scott Manning (1958–2006), Canadian football player and plane pilot
- Scott Manning (soccer) (born 1957), American soccer goalkeeper
- Sharon Manning (born 1969), American basketball player
- Sidney E. Manning (1892–1960), American Medal of Honor recipient
- Skip Manning (born 1945), American NASCAR driver
- Steven Manning, Scottish rugby union player
- Stuart Manning (born 1979), English actor and model
- Susan Manning (American academic), American dance historian
- Susan Manning (Scottish academic) (1953–2013), Scottish academic in Scottish studies and English literature.

=== T ===
- Taryn Manning (born 1978), American actress
- Tashawn Manning (born 1998), American football player
- Teresa Manning, American public official and activist
- Terrell Manning (born 1990), American football player
- Terry Manning (1947–2025), American music producer and engineer
- Thomas Manning (sinologist) (1772–1840), Chinese studies scholar and the first Englishman to enter Lhasa
- Thomas Manning (bishop), Tudor prior and bishop
- Thomas A. Manning (1886–1944), American politician
- Thomas Courtland Manning (1825–1887), American jurist
- Thomas Henry Manning (1911–1998), British-Canadian Arctic explorer and author
- Thomas Manning (priest), Archdeacon of Totnes, 1453
- Thomas Manning (cricketer) (1884–1975), English cricketer
- Tim Manning (1853–1934), English baseball player in the USA
- Timothy Manning (1909–1989), Cardinal Archbishop of Los Angeles
- Tina Manning (1950–1979), Paiute-Shoshone water rights activist
- Tom Manning (murderer) (1946–2019), American militant radical and bank robber
- Tom Manning (American football) (born 1983), American football coach
- Tommy Manning (born 1976), American mountain and distance runner
- Tony Manning (born 1943), Australian track and field athlete
- Tracy Stone-Manning (born 1965), American environmental policy advisor
- Trevor Manning (born 1945), New Zealand field hockey goalkeeper

=== V ===
- Van. H. Manning (1839–1892), American politician and soldier
- Van H. Manning (engineer) (1861–1932), American engineer
- V. C. Manning (born 1947), American educator and politician

=== W ===
- Wade Manning (born 1955), American football player
- Walter Manning (1920–1945), American fighter pilot
- Warren H. Manning (1860–1938), American landscape designer
- Wayne Eyer Manning (1899–2004), American botanist
- Wayne O. Manning (1921–2017), American politician
- William Manning (Unitarian) (1630/33–1711), English ejected minister and writer
- William Manning (author) (1747–1814), American author, farmer and soldier
- William Manning (British politician) (1763–1835), Governor of the Bank of England
- William Manning (colonial administrator) (1863–1932), British Indian Army officer and colonial administrator
- William Manning (Australian politician) (1903–1986), Australian businessman and politician
- William Manning (bishop), Anglican Bishop of George in South Africa
- William Montagu Manning (1811–1895), Australian politician and judge
- William Oke Manning (1879–1958), English aeronautical engineer
- William Patrick Manning (1845–1915), Australian financier and politician
- William T. Manning (1866–1949), bishop of New York
- Willie Jerome Manning (born 1968), American death row prisoner
- Wyndham Meredith Manning (1890–1967), American politician from South Carolina

=== Sports ===
- The Manning family of American football:
  - Archie Manning (born 1949), quarterback and family patriarch
  - Cooper Manning (born 1974), oldest son of Archie; wide receiver, later businessman and sports commentator
  - Peyton Manning (born 1976), middle son of Archie; quarterback
  - Eli Manning (born 1981), youngest son of Archie; quarterback
  - Arch Manning (born 2005), son of Cooper; quarterback
- Curtis Manning (lacrosse), (born 1987), Canadian lacrosse player
- Danieal Manning (born 1982), American football player
- Danny Manning (born 1966), American basketball player and coach
- Darren Manning (born 1975), English racecar driver
- Don Manning, American football player
- Ed Manning (1943–2011), American basketball player and coach; father of Danny Manning
- Harold Manning (1909–2003), American steeplechase runner
- Ilm Manning (born 1999), American football player
- Jack Manning (baseball) (1853–1929), American baseball player
- Jim Manning (baseball, born 1862) (1862–1929), American baseball player, manager and team owner
- Jim Manning (pitcher) (1943–2020), American baseball player
- John Manning (footballer) (1940–2021), English (soccer) footballer
- Madeline Manning (born 1948), American middle-distance runner
- Phil Manning (footballer) (1906–1930), Australian rules footballer
- Rick Manning (born 1954), American baseball player
- Ricky Manning Jr. (born 1980), American football player
- Rosie Manning (born 1950), American football player
- Rube Manning (1883–1930), American baseball player
- Scott Manning (1958–2006), football player and plane pilot
- Paul Mannion (born 1993), Gaelic football player
- Tashawn Manning (born 1998), American football player
- Trevor Manning (born 1945), New Zealand Olympic Gold Medallist in Field Hockey

=== Fictional ===
- Craig Manning, character on Degrassi: The Next Generation
- Curtis Manning (24 character), character on 24
- Danielle Manning, character on One Life to Live
- David Manning (fictitious writer)
- Jack Manning, character on One Life to Live
- Meg Manning, character on Veronica Mars
- Sam Manning (One Life to Live), character on One Life to Live
- Sarah Manning, character on Orphan Black
- Kira Manning, character on Orphan Black
- Starr Manning, character on One Life to Live
- Téa Delgado, Téa Delgado Manning, character on One Life to Live
- Todd Manning, character on One Life to Live

== See also ==
- Frederick Edward Maning, New Zealand settler, judge and author
- Irish clans
