= Robert Manning =

Robert or Bob Manning may refer to:

- Robert Manning (engineer) (1816–1897), Irish engineer
- Robert Manning (journalist) (1919–2012), American journalist
- Robert Manning (priest) (1655–1731), Roman Catholic priest
- Robert D. Manning (born 1957), American economist
- Robert Manning (politician) (1927–2006), member of the Ohio House of Representatives
- Bob Manning (soul singer) (born 1945), American singer
- Bob Manning (pop singer) (1926–1997), American singer popular in the 1950s
- Bob Manning (musician), British musician
- Bob Manning (mayor) (born 1945), mayor of the Cairns Regional Council, Queensland, Australia
- Bobby Manning, a fictional character played by Rick Peters in the TV series Sue Thomas: F.B.Eye

== See also ==
- Robert Mannyng (c.1275–c.1338), also known as Robert de Brunne, English monk and chronicler, a pioneer of recording English oral history
- Robert Manning Technology College, a secondary school in Bourne, Lincolnshire, named for the above listed pioneer, now known as Bourne Academy
