= David Manning (disambiguation) =

David Manning (born 1949) is a former British diplomat.

David Manning may also refer to:

- David Manning (fictitious writer), fictitious film critic
- David Manning (baseball) (born 1972), American baseball pitcher
- David Manning (cricketer) (born 1963), former English cricketer
- David Franklin Manning (1857–1929), justice of the New York Supreme Court
- Dave Manning (rugby league) (1910−1979), Australian rugby league player
- David Manning (police officer), police commissioner in Papua New Guinea
- D. J. Manning (David John Manning, 1938–2014), British academic
- David Manning, pseudonym of Frederick Schiller Faust (1892–1944), American western author known as Max Brand
- David Manning, professional wrestling referee and booker best known for his work in the Texas-based World Class Championship Wrestling during the 1980s
