= Henry Manning =

Henry Manning may refer to:

- Henry Manning (spy), spy in the exiled court of Charles II at Cologne and Brussels
- Henry Manning (politician) (1877–1963), Australian lawyer and politician
- Henry Edward Manning (1808–1892), English Roman Catholic Archbishop of Westminster
- Henry J. Manning (1859–?), U.S. Navy sailor and Medal of Honor recipient
- Henry Manning (?–1924), American murder victim of Wanda Stopa
- Henry Parker Manning (1859-1956), American professor of mathematics.
