= Phil Manning =

Phil Manning may refer to:

- Phil Manning (footballer) (1906–1930), Australian rules footballer
- Phil Manning (musician) (born 1948), Australian blues musician

== See also ==
- Manning (surname)
