= Manning (disambiguation) =

Manning is a family name.

Manning may also refer to:

== Places ==
=== Australia ===
- Manning, Western Australia
- The Manning River

=== Austria ===
- Manning, Upper Austria

=== Canada ===
- Manning, Alberta
- Manning Drive, Edmonton, Alberta

=== China ===
- Manning, the Chinese Postal Map Romanisation of the name of Wanning City, Hainan Province

=== United States ===
- Manning, Iowa
- Manning, Kansas
- Manning, Michigan
- Manning, South Carolina
- Manning, Texas
- Manning, North Dakota
- Manning, Oregon an unincorporated area in NW Oregon

== Seafaring and ships ==
- Manning the rail, a method of saluting or rendering honors used by naval vessels
- USRC Manning (1898), a United States Revenue Cutter Service cutter that served from 1898 to 1930
- USS Manning (DE-199), a U.S. Navy destroyer escort that served from 1943 to 1947
- R/V John R. Manning (FWS 1002), a U.S. Fish and Wildlife Service fisheries research vessel in commission from 1950 to 1969
- Widow's manning or Widow's man, the practice of British ships in the Georgian era keeping seamen who were killed on the books so their wages could be paid to their widows

== Other ==
- E.C. Manning Provincial Park, British Columbia, Canada
- Manning (band), a band from Leeds, England
- Manning Publications
- Robert Manning Technology College, a secondary school in Bourne, Lincolnshire

== See also ==
- Manpower (disambiguation)
- Justice Manning (disambiguation)
