= Michael Mann (disambiguation) =

Michael Mann is an American film director, screenwriter, and producer

Michael Mann may also refer to:

- Michael Mann (bishop) (1924–2011), Anglican bishop
- Hollywood Fats (Michael Leonard Mann, 1954–1986), American blues guitarist
- Michael Mann (judge) (1930–1998), English judge
- Michael Mann (scholar) (1919–1977), musician and professor of German literature
- Michael Mann (sociologist) (born 1942), professor of sociology
- Michael E. Mann (born 1965), climatologist and geophysicist

== See also ==
- Michael, Isle of Man, one of the six sheadings of Isle of Man
- Michael Manning (disambiguation)
