= Bill Maurer =

American anthropologist

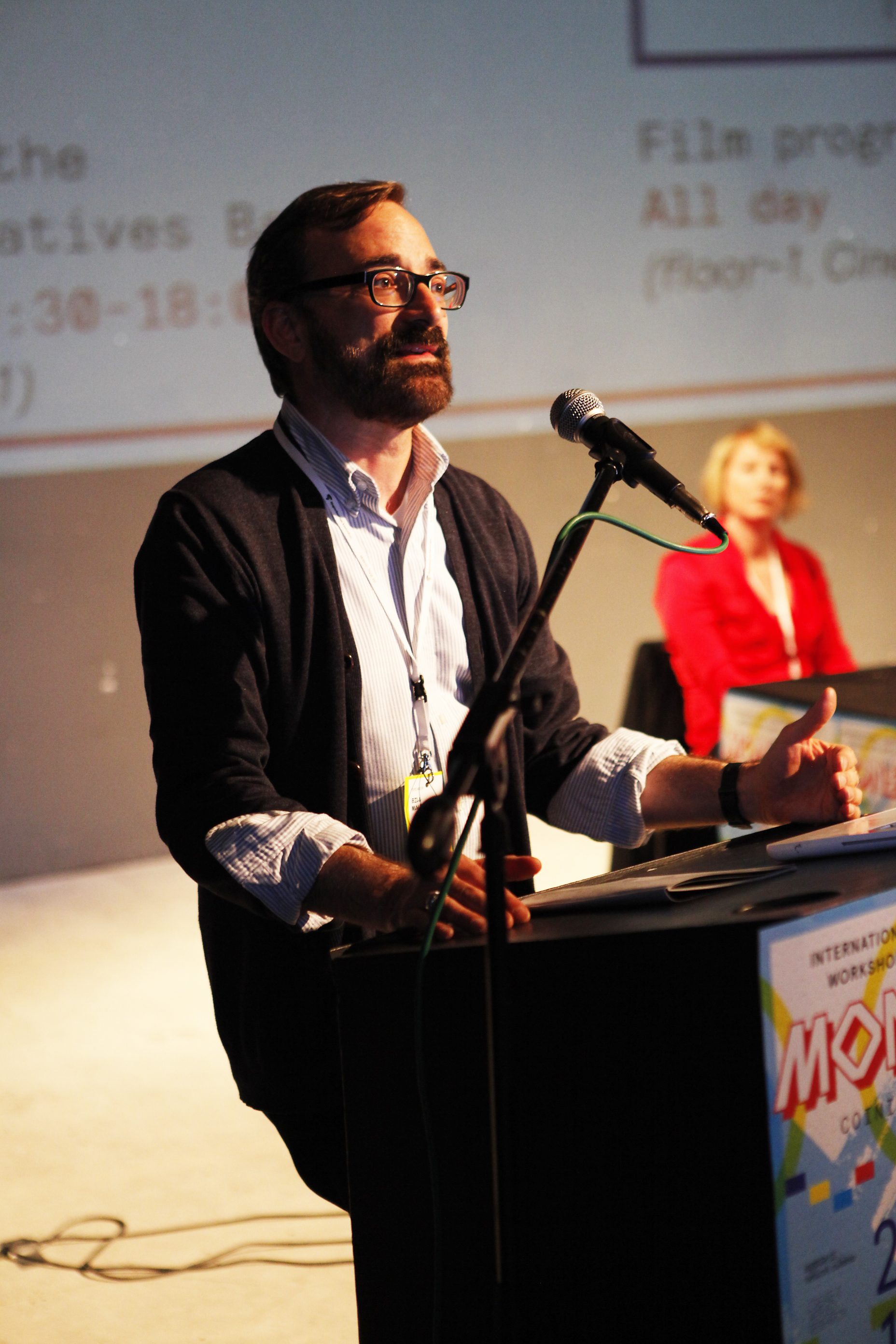
Maurer in 2014

William M. Maurer (born March 31, 1968) is an American academic scholar of legal and economic anthropology. He currently serves as the dean of the School of Social Sciences at the University of California, Irvine. He has conducted research on money, finance, economy, and law, including the off-shore financial services industry in the Caribbean, alternative currencies, Islamic finance, mobile money, and traditional and emerging payment technologies, as well as cryptocurrencies like Bitcoin and related blockchain technologies. He has been called the “doyen” of the subfield of the anthropology of finance. Maurer is also the founding director of the Institute for Money Technology and Financial Inclusion, a research institute at UC Irvine funded by the Bill & Melinda Gates Foundation, and a fellow of the Filene Research Institute. He was previously the founding co-director of the Intel Science and Technology Center in Social Computing, also at UCI.

== Career ==
Maurer received his A.B. from Vassar College and, in 1994, his Ph.D. in anthropology from Stanford University. He joined the Department of Anthropology at the University of California, Irvine in 1996. He was chair of the Department of Anthropology at UC Irvine from 2005 to 2011 and was associate dean for research and graduate studies in the social sciences from 2011 to 2013. He was appointed Dean of the School of Social Sciences in July 2013. From 2007 to 2009, Maurer was President of the Association for Political and Legal Anthropology.

Maurer is currently associate editor of the Journal of Cultural Economy and serves as a member of the editorial boards of the Journal of Islamic Accounting and Business Research, Cultural Anthropology, Cultural Critique, and PoLAR: Political and Legal Anthropology Review. In 2015, he was appointed to the Board on Behavioral, Cognitive and Sensory Sciences of the National Academy of Sciences. He is the recipient of four major National Science Foundation research grants on topics ranging from the cultures of international finance to mobile money and private digital currencies.

In 2012, Maurer consulted on the renovation of the Citi Money Gallery at the British Museum. In 2015, he was invited to provide input with 14 other academics to the United States Department of the Treasury on the redesign of the US$10 bill.

In 2016, Maurer was named a fellow of the American Association for the Advancement of Science for noteworthy advances in the fields of law and economic anthropology, specifically in banking and the meaning of money in different cultures.

== Research ==
Maurer's research encompasses ethnographic and historical work on the Caribbean offshore tax haven economy, specifically in the British Virgin Islands, Islamic banking and alternative currencies, and the material technologies and cultural practices money, finance, and law.

Maurer's first book Recharting the Caribbean: Land, Law and Citizenship in the British Virgin Islands shows how the offshore tax haven economy was not a foreign imposition, but rather grew out of local practices of kinship and land ownership and was shaped by local conflicts around class and race. This work highlights the role of colonial legal regimes and national sovereignty claims in the uneven geography of global finance. Maurer's second book Mutual Life, Limited: Islamic Banking, Alternative Currencies, Lateral Reason compares global Islamic banking and finance with the local and alternative currency movement. Maurer's work on money, especially his widely cited survey of the anthropology of money, challenges assumptions about money's effects on social life and calls for a shift in focus away from money's abstract meanings as a tool for producing equivalence and towards its diverse uses and practices, especially in settings that are not strictly market-based.

More recently, Maurer has studied the cultural and political implications of mobile and digital technologies, especially cryptocurrencies and blockchain technologies.

== Publications ==
Maurer is the author of four books, the editor or co-editor of seven collections, and the author of numerous journal articles, book chapters, reviews, working papers, and other publications. His book Mutual Life, Limited: Islamic Banking, Alternative Currencies, Lateral Reason received the Victor Turner Prize for Ethnographic Writing in 2005. He is the Editor of the forthcoming 6-volume series from Bloomsbury Press on A Cultural History of Money.

=== Books ===
- Recharting the Caribbean: Land, Law, and Citizenship in the British Virgin Islands (Ann Arbor: University of Michigan Press, 2007)
- Mutual Life, Limited: Islamic Banking, Alternative Currencies, Lateral Reason (Princeton: Princeton University Press, 2005)
- Pious Property: Islamic Mortgages in the United States (New York: Russell Sage Press, 2006)
- How Would You Like to Pay? How Technology is Changing the Future of Money (Durham: Duke University Press, 2015)

=== Selected Edited Collections ===
- Gender Matters: Re-Reading Michelle Z. Rosaldo (Ann Arbor: University of Michigan Press, 2000) (with Alejandro Lugo)
- Globalization Under Construction: Governmentality, Law, and Identity (Minneapolis: University of Minnesota Press, 2003) (with Richard W. Perry)
- Accelerating Possession: Global Futures of Property and Personhood (New York: Columbia University Press, 2006) (with Gabriele Schwab)
- Data, Now Bigger and Better! (Chicago: Prickly Paradigm Press and the University of Chicago Press, 2015) (with Tom Boellstorff)
- Paid: Tales of Dongles, Checks, and Other Money Stuff (Cambridge: The MIT Press, 2017) (with Lana Swartz)
- Money at the Margins: Global Perspectives on Technology, Financial Inclusion and Design (New York and Oxford: Berghahn Press, 2018) (with Smoki Musaraj and Ivan Small)

=== Selected articles ===
- Sanctioned Identities: Legal Constructions of Modern Personhood. Identities 2(1&2): 1-27, 1995. (with Jane Collier and Liliana Suarez-Navaz)
- A Fish Story: Rethinking Globalization on Virgin Gorda. American Ethnologist 27(3): 670–701, 2000.
- Repressed Futures: Financial Derivatives’ Theological Unconscious. Economy and Society 31(1): 15–36, 2002.
- Anthropological and Accounting Knowledge in Islamic Banking and Finance: Rethinking Critical Accounts. Journal of the Royal Anthropological Institute 8(4): 645–667, 2002.
- In the Mirror: The Legitimation Work of Globalization. Law and Social Inquiry 27(4): 701–742, 2002. (With Susan Coutin and Barbara Yngvesson)
- Uncanny Exchanges: The Possibilities and Failures of “Making Change” with Alternative Monetary Forms. Environment and Planning D: Society and Space 21(3): 317–340, 2003.
- Due Diligence and “Reasonable Man,” Offshore. Cultural Anthropology 20(4): 474–505, 2005.
- The Anthropology of Money. Annual Reviews in Anthropology 35: 15–36, 2006.
- Finance 2.0. In A Handbook of Economic Anthropology, Second Edition, ed. James G. Carrier. Cheltenham, UK and Northampton, MA: Edward Elgar, 2012.
- An Emerging Platform: From Money Transfer System to Mobile Money Ecosystem. Innovations 6(4):49-64, 2012. (With Jake Kendall, Philip Machoka, and Clara Veniard)
- Mobile Money: Communication, Consumption and Change in the Payments Space. Journal of Development Studies 48(5): 589–604, 2012.
- Payment: Forms and Functions of Value Transfer in Contemporary Society. Cambridge Anthropology 30(2):15-35, 2012.
- ‘Bridges to Cash‘: Channelling Agency in Mobile Money. Journal of the Royal Anthropological Institute 19(1): 52–74, 2013. (with Taylor C. Nelms and Stephen C. Rea)
- ‘When Perhaps the Real Problem is Money Itself!’ The Practical Materiality of Bitcoin. Social Semiotics 23(2): 261–277, 2013. (With Taylor C. Nelms and Lana Swartz)
- Ledgers and Law in the Blockchain. King's Review, 2015. (With Quinn I. DuPont)
- Social Payments: Innovation, Trust, Bitcoin, and the Sharing Economy. Theory, Culture & Society 35(3):13-33, 2017. (with the Future of Money Research Collaborative)
- Blockchains Are a Diamond's Best Friend. In Money Talks: Explaining How Money Really Works, ed. Nina Bandelj, Frederick F. Wherry, Viviana A. Zelizer. Princeton: Princeton University Press, 2017.
