= Kevin McCormack =

Kevin McCormack may refer to:

- Kevin McCormack (dancer) (born 1970), Irish dancer
- Kevin McCormack (radio personality) (born 1960), American radio personality
