= Course =

Course may refer to:

== Directions or navigation ==
- Course (navigation), the path of travel
- Course (orienteering), a series of control points visited by orienteers during a competition, marked with red/white flags in the terrain, and corresponding purple symbols on the map

== Education ==
- Course (education), a unit of instruction in one subject, lasting one academic term
- Course of study, or academic major, a programme of education leading to a degree or diploma

== Food ==
- Course (food), a set of one or more food items served at once during a meal. The main ingredient is often meat or fish. It most often follows an appetizer, soup, or salad.
- Main course, the primary dish in a meal consisting of several courses.

== Sports ==
- Courses and rules, in show jumping, an equitation or equestrian obstacle course
- Coursing, the pursuit of game or other animals by dogs
- Golf course, an area of land designated for the play of golf
- La Course by Le Tour de France ("La Course"), a women's professional road course bicycle race that accompanies Le Tour (Tour de France)
- Obstacle course, a series of challenging physical obstacles an individual or team must navigate for sport
- Race course, for the racing of people, animals, and vehicles

== Other uses ==
- Course (architecture), a continuous horizontal layer of similarly sized building material, in a wall
- Course (medicine), a regime of medical drugs, or the speed of evolution of a disease
- Course (music), a pair or more of adjacent strings tuned to unison or an octave and played together to give a single note, in a stringed instrument
- Course (sail), the principal sail on a mast of a sailing vessel
- String course, a continuous narrow horizontal course or moulding which projects slightly from the surface of a wall
- The Course, a Dutch dance music group
- Watercourse, the channel that a flowing body of water follows

== See also ==
- La Course (surname)
- Courser (horse)
- Courser
- Coarse (disambiguation)
