= James Wilcox =

James Wilcox may refer to:

- James Wilcox (actor), American actor; see The Peacock Fan
- James Wilcox (novelist) (born 1949), American novelist and professor
- James A. Wilcox (born 1952), American economist and professor
- James D. Wilcox, American film editor and director
- J. Mark Wilcox (James Mark Wilcox; 1890–1956), U.S. Representative from Florida
