= Filene Research Institute =

American think tank

- Type: Cooperative
- Industry: Finance
- Founded: 1989
- Headquarters: Madison, Wisconsin, United States
- Key people: Mark Meyer, president and CEO; Patsy Stewart, chief finance officer and COO; Christie Kimbell, chief experience officer
- Products: Basic and applied research, product testing and incubation, advisory services, training and education, events and communities
- Website: filene.org

The Filene Research Institute is an American credit union and consumer finance think tank headquartered in Madison, Wisconsin.

== History and objective ==
Founded in 1989, the institute is named for Edward Filene, a Boston, Massachusetts-based businessman and philanthropist who was instrumental in the creation of credit unions in the U.S.

In 1993, the institute published a research report on the evolution of credit union field of membership, helping to lay the groundwork for H.R 1151, the Credit Union Membership Access Act.

In 2003, the institute started the REAL Solutions project to study financial services for low-income households and address predatory lending and other fringe financial services. The project became a program of the National Credit Union Foundation in 2007.

In 2004, the institute launched an innovation training program called i3 (for "Ideas, Innovation, Implementation"), which brings together credit union executives to identify new solutions and business models in financial services.

In 2010, the institute established the Cooperative Trust program and community to support credit union young professionals. In 2017, the Cooperative Trust was awarded the Herb Wegner Memorial Outstanding Program Award by the National Credit Union Foundation

The institute engages several prominent academic researchers, including:

- Sekou Bermiss
- Dennis Campbell
- Robert Hoel
- William E. Jackson
- Jinkook Lee
- Robert D. Manning
- Bill Maurer
- Hayagreeva "Huggy" Rao
- Quinetta Roberson
- Barbara J. Robles
- J. Edward Russo
- Hope Schau
- Lisa J. Servon
- Peter Tufano
- James A. Wilcox

== Partnerships ==
In early 2012, it partnered with Saveup; a company which rewards fiscal responsibility.

The institute is a grantee of the Center for Financial Services Innovation.

The institute has also been supported by the Ford Foundation and Visa to conduct research on financial services for households of color, including Latino/a and immigrant households.

== See also ==
- List of credit unions in the United States
- List of think tanks in the United States
