= Michael Manning =

Michael Manning may refer to:

- Michael Manning (priest) (1940s–2016), Roman Catholic priest
- Michael Manning (murderer) (1929–1954), last person to be executed in the Republic of Ireland
- Michael Manning (fetish artist) (born 1963), fetish artist based in Los Angeles, California
- Mick Manning (born 1959), children's author and illustrator
- Michael J. Manning (1943–2008), Papua New Guinean activist
- Mike Manning (actor) (born 1987), American reality television personality and actor

== See also ==
- Michael Manring (born 1960), American bass guitarist
