= Matt Manning (disambiguation) =

Matt Manning (born 1998) is an American baseball player.

Matt Manning may also refer to:

- Matt Manning, American musician, former member of From First to Last
- Matt Manning (rugby league) (born 1974), Australian former rugby player
- Matthew Manning
