= Jeremiah Troy =

American Navy sailor

- Born: Joseph M. Trout c. 1845; New York City
- Died: March 17, 1917 (aged 71–72); Brooklyn, New York, U.S.
- Burial place: Holy Cross Cemetery, Brooklyn
- Military career
- Allegiance: United States of America
- Branch: United States Navy
- Rank: Chief Boatswain's Mate
- Unit: USS New Hampshire
- Awards: Medal of Honor

Jeremiah Troy (c. 1845–1917) was a United States Navy sailor and a recipient of the United States military's highest decoration, the Medal of Honor.

== Biography ==
Born in about 1845 in New York, New York, Troy joined the Navy from that state. By April 21, 1882, he was serving as a chief boatswain's mate on the training ship USS New Hampshire. On that day, while New Hampshire was at Newport, Rhode Island, he and another sailor, Boatswain's Mate James F. Sullivan, jumped overboard and rescued Third Class Boy Francis T. Price from drowning. For this action, both Troy and Sullivan were awarded the Medal of Honor two and a half years later, on October 18, 1884.

Troy's official Medal of Honor citation reads:

For jumping overboard from the U.S. Training Ship New Hampshire, at Newport, R.I., 21 April 1882, and rescuing from drowning Francis T. Price, third class boy.

Troy died on January 11, 1897, in Brooklyn, New York and is buried in the Holy Cross Cemetery in Brooklyn.

== See also ==
- List of Medal of Honor recipients in non-combat incidents
