= Manpower (disambiguation) =

Manpower, or human resources, is the workforce in an organisation.

Manpower may also refer to:

== Arts and entertainment ==
- Manpower (1941 film), an American crime melodrama
- Manpower (1942 film), an American government propaganda short
- Man Power, a lost 1927 American comedy silent film
- Manpower (album), by Miquel Brown, 1983
- "The Manpower!!!", a 2005 song by Morning Musume

== Businesses and organizations ==
- ManpowerGroup, formerly Manpower Inc., a multinational corporation
- Manpower Directorate, an Israel Defense Forces body
- Manpower Directorate (Australia), an Australian government body in World War II

== See also ==
- Manning (disambiguation)
- Human power, work or energy produced from the human body
- Manpower Services Commission, a former British non-departmental public body
