= Justice Manning =

Justice Manning may refer to:

- Amos R. Manning (1810–1880), associate justice of the Alabama Supreme Court
- James S. Manning (1859–1938), associate justice of the North Carolina Supreme Court
- Randolph Manning (1804–1864), associate justice of the Michigan Supreme Court
- Thomas Courtland Manning (1825–1887), chief justice of the Louisiana Supreme Court
