= John McCarton =

American sailor (c.1847–1887)

- Born: c. 1847; Brooklyn, New York, US
- Died: December 22, 1887 (aged 39–40)
- Burial place: Holy Cross Cemetery, Brooklyn
- Military career
- Allegiance: United States
- Branch: United States Navy
- Rank: Ship's Printer
- Unit: USS New Hampshire
- Awards: Medal of Honor

John McCarton (c. 1847–1887) was a United States Navy sailor and a recipient of the United States military's highest decoration, the Medal of Honor.

== Biography ==
Born in 1847 in Brooklyn, New York, McCarton joined the Navy from that state. By January 4, 1882, he was serving as a ship's printer on the training ship USS New Hampshire. On that day, while New Hampshire was off Coaster's Harbor Island in Newport, Rhode Island, he and another sailor, Quartermaster Henry J. Manning, jumped overboard in an attempt to save Second Class Musician Jabez Smith from drowning. For this action, both McCarton and Manning were awarded the Medal of Honor three years later, on October 18, 1884.

McCarton's official Medal of Honor citation reads:

For jumping overboard from the U.S. Training Ship New Hampshire off Coasters Harbor Island, near Newport, R.l., 4 January 1882, and endeavoring to rescue Jabez Smith, second class musician, from drowning.

== See also ==
- List of Medal of Honor recipients during peacetime
