= Coarse =

Coarse may refer to:

- Bosnian Coarse-Haired Hound, developed by 19th century Bosnian hunters as a scent hound.
- Coarse (behavior), vulgar behavior
- Coarse bubble diffusers, produce 1/4 to 1/2 inch bubbles which rise rapidly from the floor of a wastewater treatment plant or sewage treatment plant tank.
- Coarse fishing, an angling method, mostly popular throughout Europe.
- Coarse sandpaper, a form of paper where an abrasive material has been fixed to its surface, allowing rapid removal of material by rubbing.
- Coarse structure, on a set X is a collection of subsets of the cartesian product X × X with certain. properties which allow the large-scale structure of metric spaces and topological spaces to be defined. Used in the mathematical fields of geometry and topology.
- Coarse woody debris (CWD), a term used for the dead trees left standing or fallen, including branches on the ground.
- Styrian Coarse Haired Hound, a rough coated, hardy hunting dog used by Austrians and Slovenians to hunt Wild Boar.
- Granularity
- Coarse books, a British series of humorous books on sports and pursuits by Michael Green or Spike Hughes, e.g. The Art of Coarse Rugby
- Coarse model, a computationally fast, auxiliary model paired with a fine model in engineering modeling and optimization by space mapping.

== See also ==
- Course (disambiguation)
