= Kevin McCormack (radio personality) =

American Roman Catholic deacon (born 1960)

Kevin J. McCormack (born October 1, 1960) is a Roman Catholic deacon with the Diocese of Rockville Centre, assigned to Our Lady of Peace parish in Lynbrook, New York. He is also co-host of WABC radio's longest running show, Religion on the Line, with Rabbi Joseph Potasnik.

== Education and career ==
Kevin McCormack graduated from St. Pius X prep Seminary, Uniondale; Cathedral College, Douglaston; and the Seminary of the Immaculate Conception, Huntington and continued on to receive his master's degree in education from Fordham University.

Involved in Catholic education for over 30 years throughout the New York metropolitan area, McCormack served as the principal of Xaverian High School in Brooklyn until May 2022 and as an adjunct instructor of theology at Molloy College.

In May 2022, it was announced that McCormack would take over as the superintendent of schools for the Diocese of Brooklyn following the retirement of Thomas Chadzutko.

He was ordained a Deacon in 2002 by William Murphy (Bishop of Rockville Centre).
