= USS New Hampshire (1864) =

New Hampshire named ship

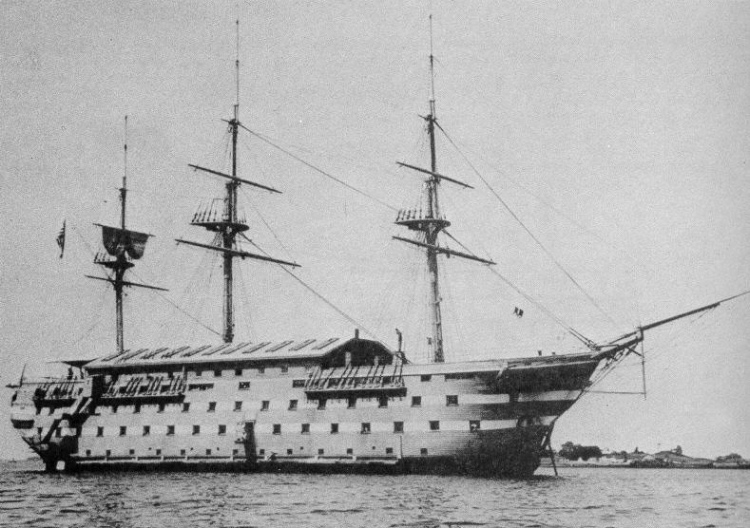
- USS New Hampshire housed over

History

United States
- Name: Alabama (1819–1863); New Hampshire (1863–1904); Granite State (1904–1922)
- Laid down: June 1819
- Launched: 23 April 1864 at the Portsmouth Naval Shipyard
- Commissioned: 13 May 1864
- Out of service: 23 May 1921
- Fate: Burned, 23 May 1921; Sunk under tow, 26 July 1922

General characteristics
- Tonnage: 2633
- Length: 203.7 ft (62.1 m)
- Beam: 51.3 ft (15.6 m)
- Draft: 21 ft 6 in (6.55 m)
- Propulsion: Sail
- Complement: 820 officers and men
- Armament: 4 × 100-pounder Parrott rifles; 6 × 9 in (229 mm) Dahlgren guns
- The New Hampshire
- U.S. National Register of Historic Places
- Location within Massachusetts
- Nearest city: Manchester-by-the-Sea, Massachusetts
- Coordinates: 42°34′14″N 70°44′44″W
- Built: 1819
- Architect: William Doughty
- NRHP reference No.: 76000261
- Added to NRHP: 29 October 1976

USS New Hampshire was a 2,633-ton ship originally designed to be the 74-gun ship of the line Alabama, but after being laid down in June 1819, she remained on the stocks for nearly 40 years, well into the age of steam. Renamed as New Hampshire, she was launched as a storeship and depot ship for use during the American Civil War. She was later renamed as Granite State. The ship burned and sank in the Hudson River in May 1921, and after being refloated, again caught fire and sank under tow near Manchester-by-the-Sea, Massachusetts, in July 1922.

== Service history ==
=== Alabama ===
As Alabama, she was one of "nine ships to rate not less than 74 guns each" authorized by Congress on 29 April 1816, and was laid down by the Portsmouth Naval Shipyard, Maine, in June 1819, the year the State of Alabama was admitted to the Union. Though ready for launch by 1825, she remained on the stocks for preservation; an economical measure that avoided the expense of manning and maintaining a ship of the line.

=== New Hampshire ===
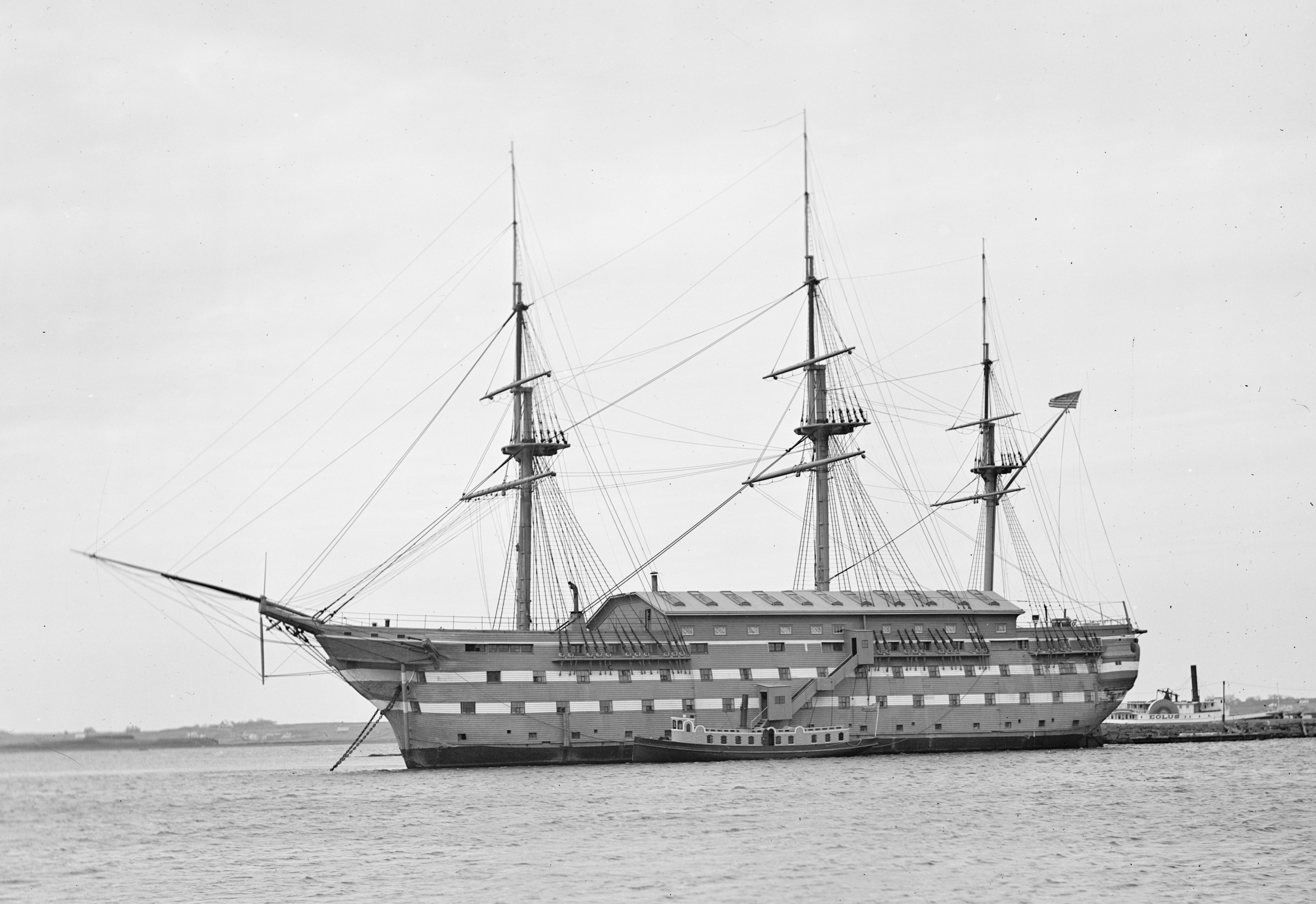
USS New Hampshire between 1890 and 1901

Renamed New Hampshire on 28 October 1863, the ship was launched on 23 April 1864, fitted out as a storeship and depot ship of the South Atlantic Blockading Squadron, and commissioned on 13 May 1864, Commodore Henry K. Thatcher in command.

New Hampshire sailed from Portsmouth, New Hampshire, on 15 June and relieved sister ship Vermont on 29 July 1864 as store and depot ship at Port Royal, South Carolina, and served there through the end of the Civil War. She returned to Norfolk, Virginia, on 8 June 1866, serving as a receiving ship there until 10 May 1876, when she sailed back to Port Royal. She resumed duty at Norfolk in 1881 but soon shifted to Newport, Rhode Island. She became flagship of Commodore Stephen B. Luce's newly formed Apprentice Training Squadron, marking the commencement of an effective apprentice training program for the Navy. Four of New Hampshire's crewmen earned the Medal of Honor for jumping overboard to rescue fellow sailors from drowning in two separate 1882 incidents: Quartermaster Henry J. Manning and Ship's Printer John McCarton on 4 January 1882, and Boatswain's Mate James F. Sullivan and Chief Boatswain's Mate Jeremiah Troy on 21 April 1882.

New Hampshire was towed from Newport to New London, Connecticut, in 1891 and was receiving ship there until decommissioned on 5 June 1892. The following year, she was loaned as a training ship for the New York Naval Militia, which was to furnish nearly 1,000 officers and men to the Navy during the Spanish–American War.

=== Granite State ===
The ship was renamed Granite State on 30 November 1904 to free the name "New Hampshire" for a newly authorized battleship, New Hampshire (BB-25). Stationed in the Hudson River, Granite State continued training service throughout the years leading to World War I when state naval militia were practically the only trained and equipped men available to the Navy for immediate service. They were mustered into the Navy as National Naval Volunteers. Josephus Daniels, Secretary of the Navy and also a newspaper editor, wrote in his paper Our Navy at War, "never again will men dare ridicule the Volunteer, the Reservist, the man who in a national crisis lays aside civilian duty to become a soldier or sailor—they fought well. They died well. They have left in deeds and words a record that will be an inspiration to unborn generations."

Granite State served the New York state militia until she caught fire and sank at her pier in the Hudson River on 23 May 1921. Her hull was sold for salvage on 19 August to the Mulholland Machinery Corporation. Refloated in July 1922, she was taken in tow headed for the Bay of Fundy. The towline parted during a storm, she again caught fire and sank off Half Way Rock near Manchester-by-the-Sea, Massachusetts, on 26 July.

The shipwreck is in 30 ft (9.1 m) of water, and is an easy scuba dive mission. Although the hull is mostly buried in the sand, small artifacts and copper spikes may still be found. The site was added to the National Register of Historic Places on 29 October 1976, reference number 76000261.

== See also ==
- National Register of Historic Places listings in Essex County, Massachusetts

== Sources ==
- Eger, Christopher L. (March 2021). "Hudson Fulton Celebration, Part II". Warship International. LVIII (1): 58–81. ISSN 0043-0374.
- Chapelle, Howard (1949). The History of the American Sailing Navy: the Ships and their Development. New York City: Norton.
