= The Nearness of You =

1937 song by Hoagy Carmichael & Ned Washington

Single by Glenn Miller
- A-side: "The Nearness of You"
- B-side: "Mister Meadowlark"
- Published: 1940 by Famous Music
- Released: 1940
- Recorded: April 28, 1940
- Genre: Jazz
- Label: Bluebird
- Songwriters: Hoagy Carmichael, Ned Washington

"The Nearness of You" is a popular song written in 1937 by Hoagy Carmichael, with lyrics by Ned Washington. Intended for an unproduced Paramount Pictures film titled Romance In The Rough, the studio's publishing division Famous Music reregistered and published the song three years later in 1940. It was first recorded by Chick Bullock and his Orchestra on Vocalion.

The song was also heard in the later 1940 recording "In the Mood" by Glenn Miller and His Orchestra, with vocals by Ray Eberle. Later in the 1940s and the early 1950s, many other artists covered the song, including George Shearing, Sarah Vaughan, Charlie Parker, Gerry Mulligan, Bob Manning, and a duet version by Louis Armstrong with Ella Fitzgerald. James Taylor joined Michael Brecker for a pop/jazz version on Brecker's 2000 album Nearness of You: The Ballad Book. Two years later, the song closed the Grammy Award–winning album Come Away with Me by Norah Jones.

== Covers ==
The first big-selling version was recorded on April 28, 1940, by the Glenn Miller Orchestra, with a vocal by Ray Eberle (Bluebird Records). This recording first reached the Billboard magazine's "Best Seller" chart on July 20, 1940, and lasted eight weeks on the chart, peaking at No. 5.

In 1953, Bob Manning reached No. 16 on the pop charts with an easy listening version, supported by an orchestra conducted by Monty Kelly, later known for his arrangements for 101 Strings. The 1956 Ella Fitzgerald and Louis Armstrong album of duets, Ella & Louis, included a version of this song with Fitzgerald trading vocal lines with Armstrong who also supplied trumpet solos. Accompaniment was provided by the small combo of Oscar Peterson on piano, Ray Brown on bass, Herb Ellis on guitar, and Buddy Rich on drums. The album reached No. 1 on the Billboard magazine jazz chart and the top 10 on the pop chart.

== Notable cover versions ==
- 1940: Glenn Miller and His Orchestra, with singer Ray Eberle.
- 1948: George Shearing Trio – Pianology (London)
- 1949: Singer Sarah Vaughan backed by arranger Joe Lipman and his orchestra
- 1950: Woody Herman and His Orchestra; arrangement by Ralph Burns, solo alto sax by Herman, and solo trombone by Bill Harris. This song appeared in the 1951 film Follow the Sun.
- 1951: Saxophonist Charlie Parker with the Woody Herman Orchestra, playing live for a radio broadcast from Kansas City.
- 1953:
  - Singer Bob Manning, with orchestration by Monty Kelly. (Capitol).
  - Vibraphonist Lionel Hampton in quartet format with Ray Brown on bass, Oscar Peterson on piano, and Buddy Rich on drums.
  - Drummer Gene Krupa in sextet format with Ray Brown on bass, Teddy Wilson on piano, Bill Harris on trombone, Eddie "Lockjaw" Davis on tenor sax, and Charlie Shavers on trumpet.
- 1954: Live concert in Paris by saxophonist Gerry Mulligan with Chet Baker on trumpet, Bob Brookmeyer on trombone, Red Mitchell on bass, and drummer Frank Isola – Pleyel Jazz Concert Vol. 1. Mulligan also recorded the song in 1953 with Baker and the drummer Larry Bunker, and in 1955 with Baker and the drummer Chico Hamilton.
- 1956: Trumpeter Louis Armstrong with singer Ella Fitzgerald – Ella and Louis. Fitzgerald recorded the song again on her 1989 Pablo Records release All that Jazz.
- 1960: Pianist George Shearing with singer Nancy Wilson – The Swingin's Mutual
- 2000: Saxophonist Michael Brecker with James Taylor on vocals – Nearness of You: The Ballad Book. Taylor included the song with a new lineup and a different arrangement on his American Standard album in 2020.
- 2002: Singer Norah Jones ended her album Come Away with Me with this song.
- 2003: Keith Richars and The Rolling Stones: Circus Krone Bau, München, Germany. 8^{th} June [8]

== See also ==
- List of 1940s jazz standards
