= USS Vermont (1848) =

Originally intended to be a ship of the line for the U.S. Navy

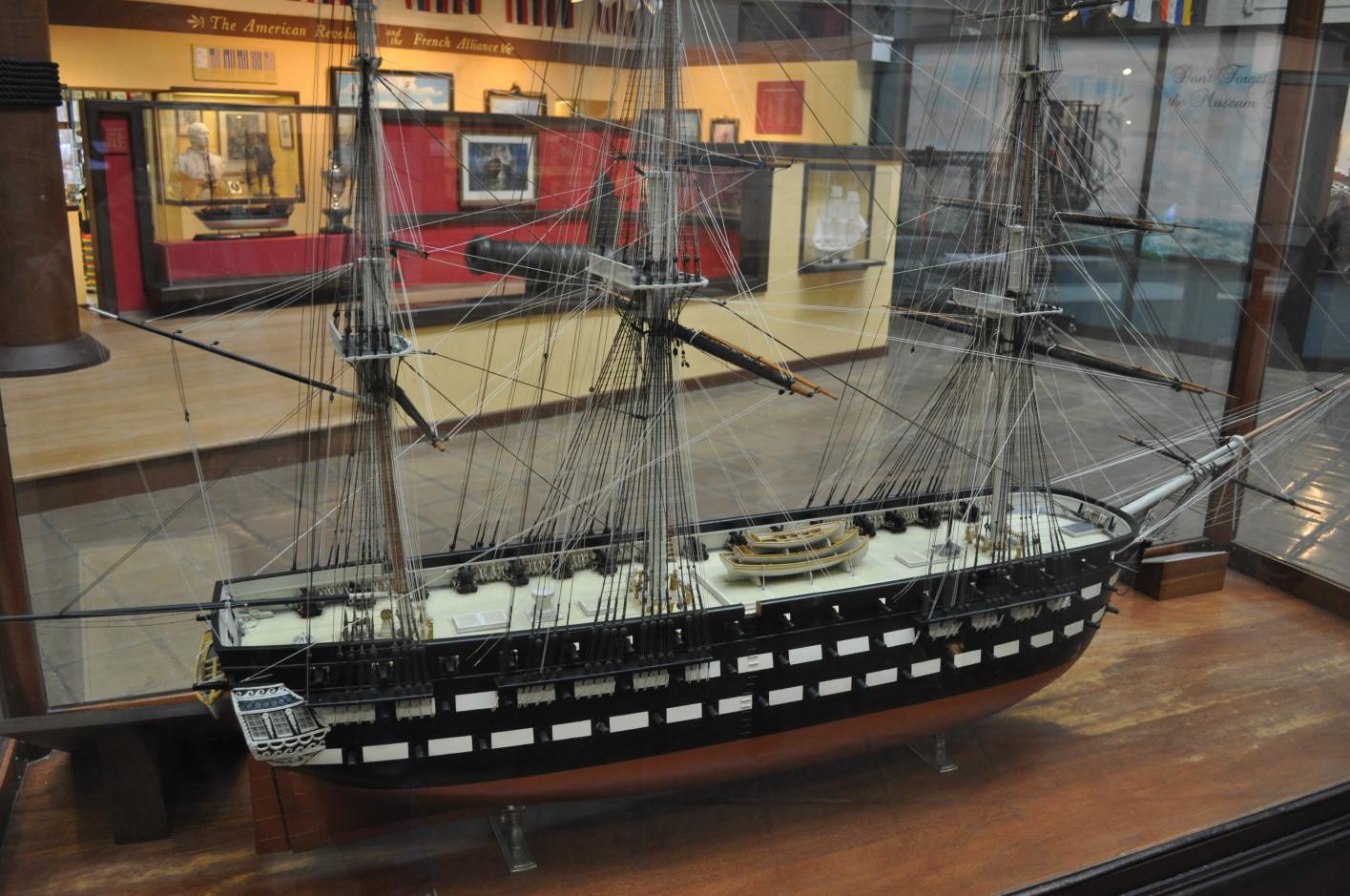
- Model of Vermont as designed at the U.S. Navy Museum

History

United States
- Name: USS Vermont
- Ordered: 29 April 1816
- Builder: Boston Navy Yard
- Laid down: September 1818
- Launched: 15 September 1848
- Commissioned: 30 January 1862
- Stricken: 19 December 1901
- Fate: Sold 17 April 1902

General characteristics
- Class & type: North Carolina-class ship of the line
- Tons burthen: 2,633
- Length: 197 ft 1.5 in (60.084 m)
- Beam: 53 ft 6 in (16.31 m)
- Depth of hold: 21 ft 6 in (6.55 m)
- Propulsion: sail
- Complement: 820
- Armament: 20 × 8 in (203 mm) shell guns; 64 × 32-pounder guns

USS Vermont was originally intended to be a ship of the line for the United States Navy when laid down in 1818, but was not commissioned until 1862, when she was too outdated to be used as anything but a stores and receiving ship.

== Service history ==
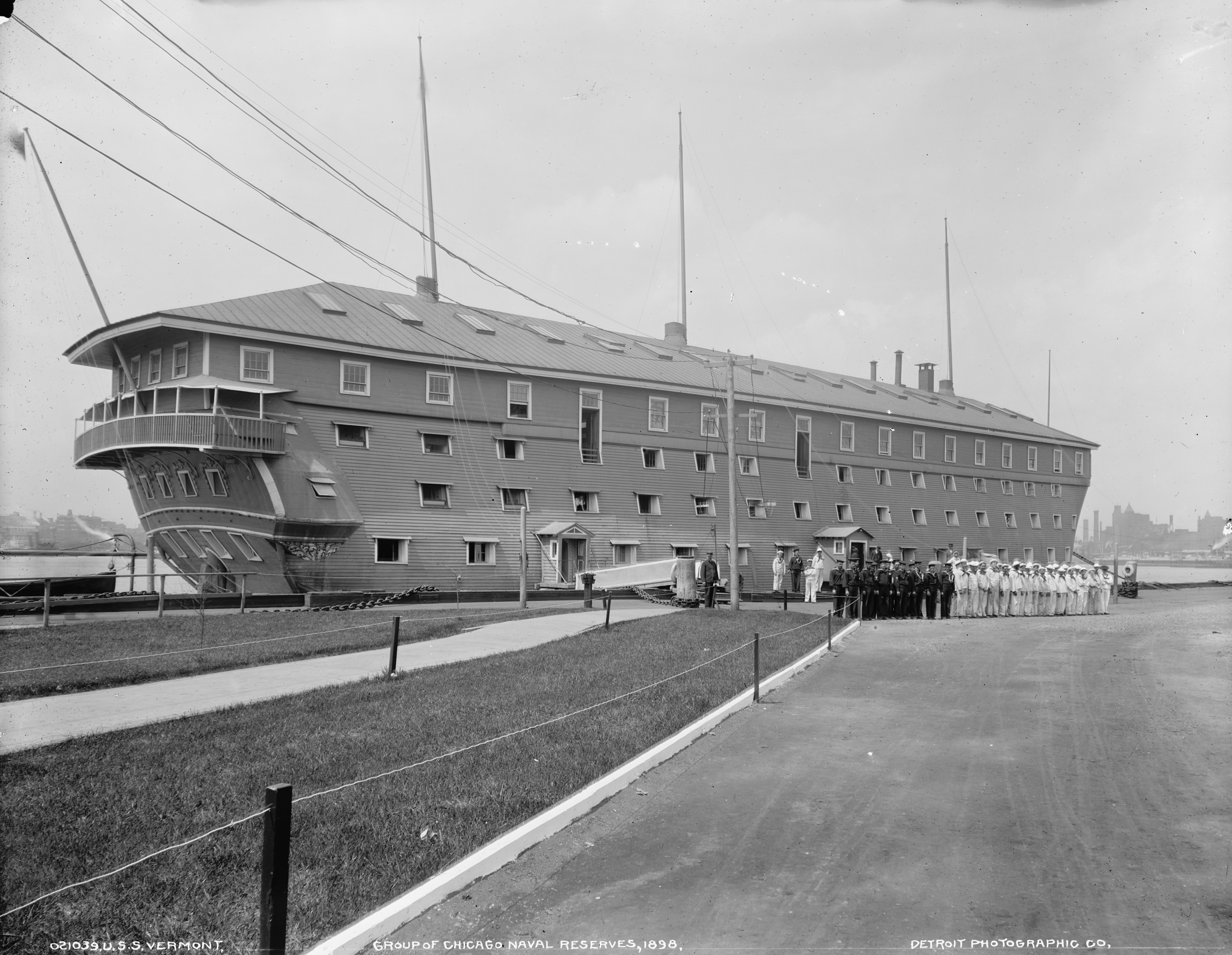
USS Vermont in 1898

Vermont was one of nine 74-gun warships authorized by United States Congress on 29 April 1816. She was laid down at the Boston Navy Yard in Boston, Massachusetts, in September 1818, finished about 1825, and kept on the stocks until finally launched on 15 September 1848 in the interest of both space and fire safety considerations. However, Vermont was not commissioned at this time. Instead the already aged ship-of-the-line remained in ordinary at Boston until the outbreak of the American Civil War in April 1861.

By the time Civil War broke out, the cavernous hull of the vessel was badly needed as a store and receiving ship at Port Royal, South Carolina, and she was commissioned at Boston on 30 January 1862, Commander Augustus S. Baldwin in command. She received orders to sail for Port Royal for duty with Rear Admiral Samuel F. Du Pont's South Atlantic Blockading Squadron on 17 February 1862 and left Boston on 24 February 1862 under tow by the steamer Kensington.

That evening, a violent northwest gale accompanied by snow struck the vessels while they were off Cape Cod Light, Massachusetts. Kensington let go the tow lines, but Vermont refused to obey her helm, broached, and had all her sails and most of her boats blown and torn away. The gale raged for 50 hours; and, by the morning of 26 February 1862, Vermont was drifting eastward with no rudder, her berth deck flooded, and much of the interior of the vessel destroyed. Later on 26 February, Vermont sighted the schooner Flying Mist, hailed her, put a man on board, and persuaded her captain to return to the United States East Coast and report the helpless condition of the ship to naval authorities. Rescue vessels began to reach the stricken ship on 7 March 1862 and enabled Vermont to sail into Port Royal under her own power on 12 April 1862.

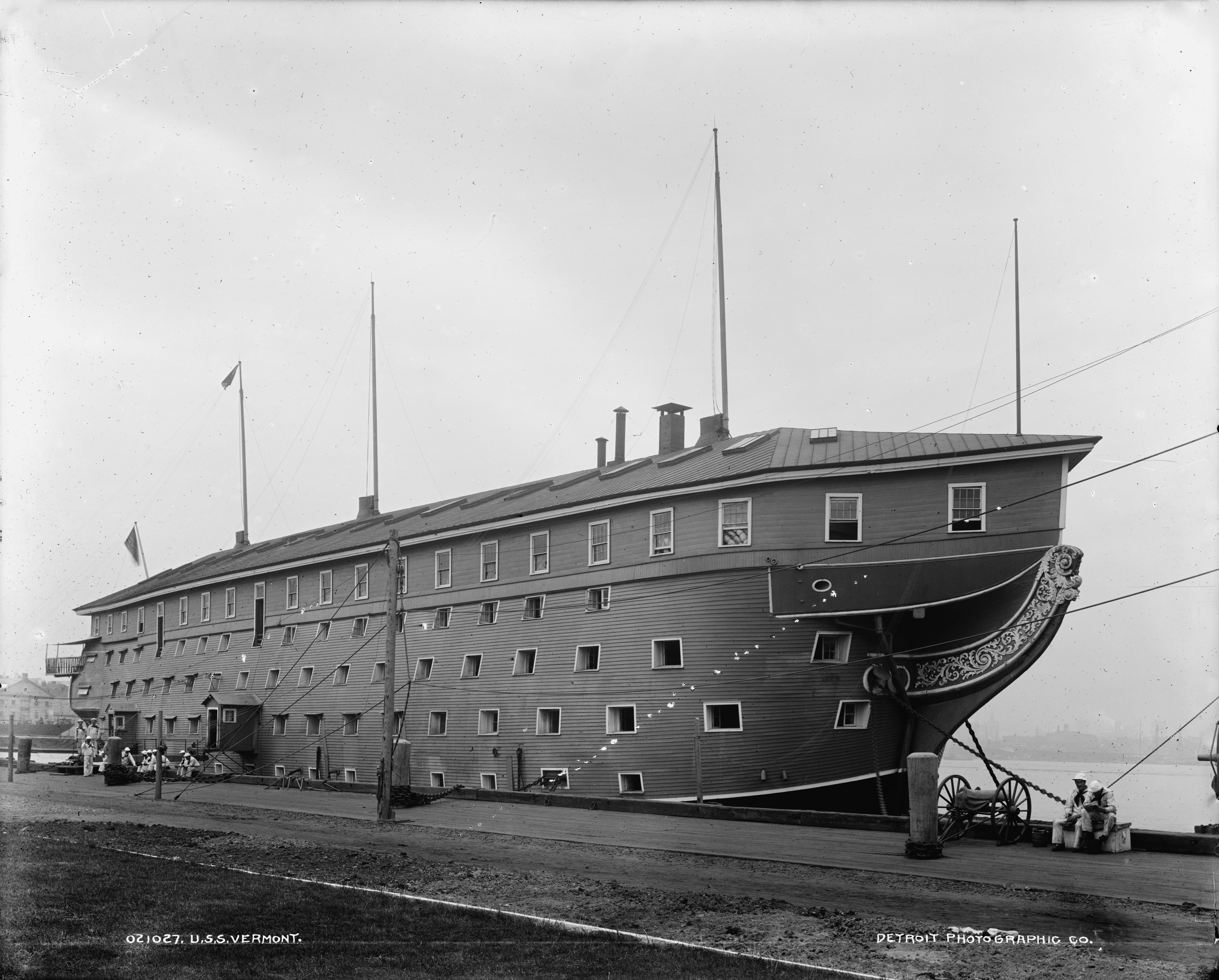
Vermont at the Brooklyn Navy Yard in 1898

Vermont remained anchored at Port Royal, where she served the South Atlantic Blockading Squadron as an ordnance, hospital, receiving, and store ship and drew praise from Rear Admiral Du Pont. On 12 December 1863, she rescued the crew of the American bark Alice Provost, which was wrecked while trying to enter port at Port Royal. United States Secretary of the Navy Gideon Welles ordered Vermont to return to New York City for "public service" on 25 July 1864. She left Port Royal on 2 August 1864 and was replaced there by her sister ship-of-the-line USS New Hampshire.

Vermont remained at the New York Navy Yard in Brooklyn, New York, for the next 37 years, serving both as a store and receiving ship. She was condemned and struck from the Navy list on 19 December 1901 and was sold at New York on 17 April 1902.
