= La Course (surname) =

La Course, LaCourse, or Lacourse is a surname. Notable people with this surname include:

- Bob Lacourse (1925–2013), Canadian cyclist
- Danielle Lacourse, Miss Rhode Island USA 2007
- Joanne LaCourse, American laser scientist
- Michelle LaCourse, American viola player
