= John Thurloe =

English politician (1616–1668)

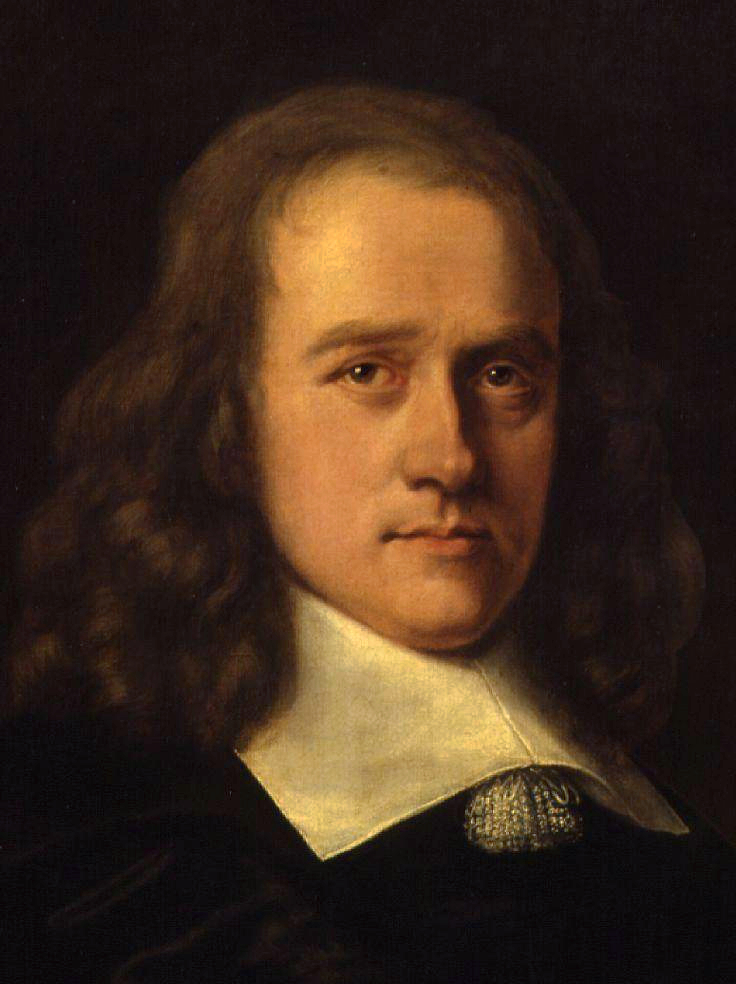

Postmaster General of England
- In office 1655–1660
- Preceded by: John Manley
- Succeeded by: Henry Bishop

Personal details
- Born: June 1616 England, Kingdom of England
- Died: 21 February 1668 (aged 51) London, England, Kingdom of England
- Children: 4 sons and 2 daughters

John Thurloe (June 1616 – 21 February 1668) was an English politician who served as secretary to the council of state in Protectorate England and spymaster for Oliver Cromwell and held the position of Postmaster General between 1655 and 1660. He was from Great Milton in Oxfordshire and of Lincoln's Inn.

== Origins ==
Thurloe was born in Essex in 1616 and was baptised on 12 June. His father was Rev. Thomas Thurloe, Rector of Abbess Roding.

== Career ==
He trained as a lawyer in Lincoln's Inn. He was first in the service of Oliver St John, solicitor–general to King Charles I and Lord Chief Justice of the Common Pleas. In January 1645, he became a secretary to the parliamentary commissioners at the Treaty of Uxbridge. In 1647, Thurloe was admitted to Lincoln's Inn as a member. He remained on the sidelines during the English Civil War but after the accession of Oliver Cromwell, became part of his government. In March 1651, Thurloe accompanied Oliver St John as his secretary on his embassy to the United Provinces to propose a union between the Commonwealth and the Dutch. In 1652, he was named a secretary for state.

In 1653, he became head of intelligence and developed a widespread network of spies in England and on the continent. These included Henry Manning, the Dutch diplomat and historian Lieuwe van Aitzema, the mathematician John Wallis, who established a code-breaking department, as well as diplomat and mathematician Samuel Morland, who served as Thurloe's assistant. Thurloe's service broke the Sealed Knot, a secret society of Royalists and uncovered various other plots against the Protectorate. In 1654, he was elected to Parliament as the member for Ely. He supported the idea that Cromwell should adopt a royal title.

In 1655, Thurloe became Postmaster General, a post he held until he was accused of treason and arrested in May 1660. His spies were able to intercept mail, and he exposed Edward Sexby's 1657 plot to assassinate Cromwell and captured would-be assassin Miles Sindercombe and his group. (Ironically, Thurloe's own department was also infiltrated: in 1659 Morland became a Royalist agent and alleged that Thurloe, Richard Cromwell and Sir Richard Willis – a Sealed Knot member turned Cromwell agent – were plotting to kill the future King Charles II.) About forty years after his death, a false ceiling was found in his rooms at Lincolns Inn; the space was full of letters seized during his occupation of the office of Postmaster-General. These letters are also now at the Bodleian.

In 1657, Thurloe became a member of Cromwell's second council, as well as governor of the London Charterhouse school, and in 1658, he became chancellor of the University of Glasgow. After the death of Oliver Cromwell in 1658, he supported his son Richard Cromwell as Lord Protector and, in 1659, represented Cambridge University in the Third Protectorate Parliament. Later that year, various parties accused him of arbitrary decisions as head of intelligence, and he was deprived of his offices. Reinstated as a secretary of state on 27 February 1660, he resisted the return of Charles II.

After the Restoration, Thurloe was arrested for high treason on 15 May 1660 but was not tried. He was released on 29 June on the condition that he would assist the new government upon request. He retired from public life but served as a behind-the-scenes authority on foreign affairs and wrote informative papers for Edward Hyde, but he did not become part of any new government.

== Marriages and children ==
He married twice:

- Firstly to a lady of the Peyton family, by whom he had two sons who died as infants;
- Secondly he married Anne Lytcott, 3rd daughter of Sir John Lytcott (died c. 1645), of East Molesey in Surrey, a Gentleman of the Privy Chamber who in 1633 had purchased the manor of East Molesey from Ralph Freeman. He was buried in St Mary's Church, East Molesey, where survives his monument and several to members of the Clerk family, the children of his daughter Ursula, who became his heirs. Anne Lytcott's mother was Mary Overbury, daughter of Nicholas Overbury of Bourton on the Hill in Gloucestershire and sister of the famous Sir Thomas Overbury. By Anne Lytcott he had four sons and two daughters, including:
  - John Thurloe, eldest son, admitted at Lincoln's–Inn in 1665, died at Amesbury in Wiltshire, where he was buried.
  - Oliver Thurloe, 2nd son, who married but died childless.
  - Thomas Thurloe, 3rd son, born in March 1650 or 1651, in about January 1676 or 1677 appointed Governor of James Island in the River Gambia, where he died.
  - Nicholas Thurloe, 4th son, "educated to the sea", living in 1678.
  - Mary Thurloe, eldest daughter, married to Thomas Ligoe of Burcott in Buckinghamshire, by whom she had issue:
    - Thomas Ligoe, married to a sister of John Hamilton;
    - Eleanor Ligoe, married to the said John Hamilton.
  - Anne Thurloe, 2nd daughter, married to Francis Brace of Bedford, by whom she had issue:
    - John Thurloe Brace, a Member of Parliament for Bedford; ***Francis Brace;
    - John Thurloe Brace, who married a lady of the name of Harris, by whom he had one son, Harris Thurloe Brace, and a daughter, Anna Maria, married to Godfrey Copley of Yorkshire.

== Death and burial ==
John Thurloe died on 21 February 1668 in his chambers in Lincoln's Inn and was buried in the chapel. His monument is inscribed as follows:

"Here lyeth the body of John Thurleo, Esq; Secretary of State to the Protector Oliver Cromwell, and a member of this honourable Society. He died Feb. 21, 1667. Here lyeth the body of Francis Brace, Esq; a member of this society. He was son of Francis Brace, esq; of the town of Bedford, by Anne, one of the daughters and co–heirs of the late John Thurleo. He died on the 6th day of April 1721, in the 34th year of his age."

His correspondence is kept in the Bodleian Library, Oxford and in the British Museum. Thomas Birch published part of it in 1742.

== Landholdings ==
He owned several manors including Whittlesey St Mary's and Whittlesey St Andrew's and an estate at Astwood in Buckinghamshire worth £400 per annum. He held the rectory of Whittlesey St Mary's, in the Isle of Ely, Cambridgeshire. He purchased the Wisbech Castle estate, sold off some of the land, cleared the remains of the bishop's palace and built and furnished a mansion (demolished c. 1816 by Joseph Medworth) just before the Restoration of the Monarchy, after which it was restored to the Bishop of Ely. Thurloe Square, Thurloe Street and Thurloe Place in South Kensington, London, are all named after him. They were built in the 1820s on land he once owned.

== Legacy ==
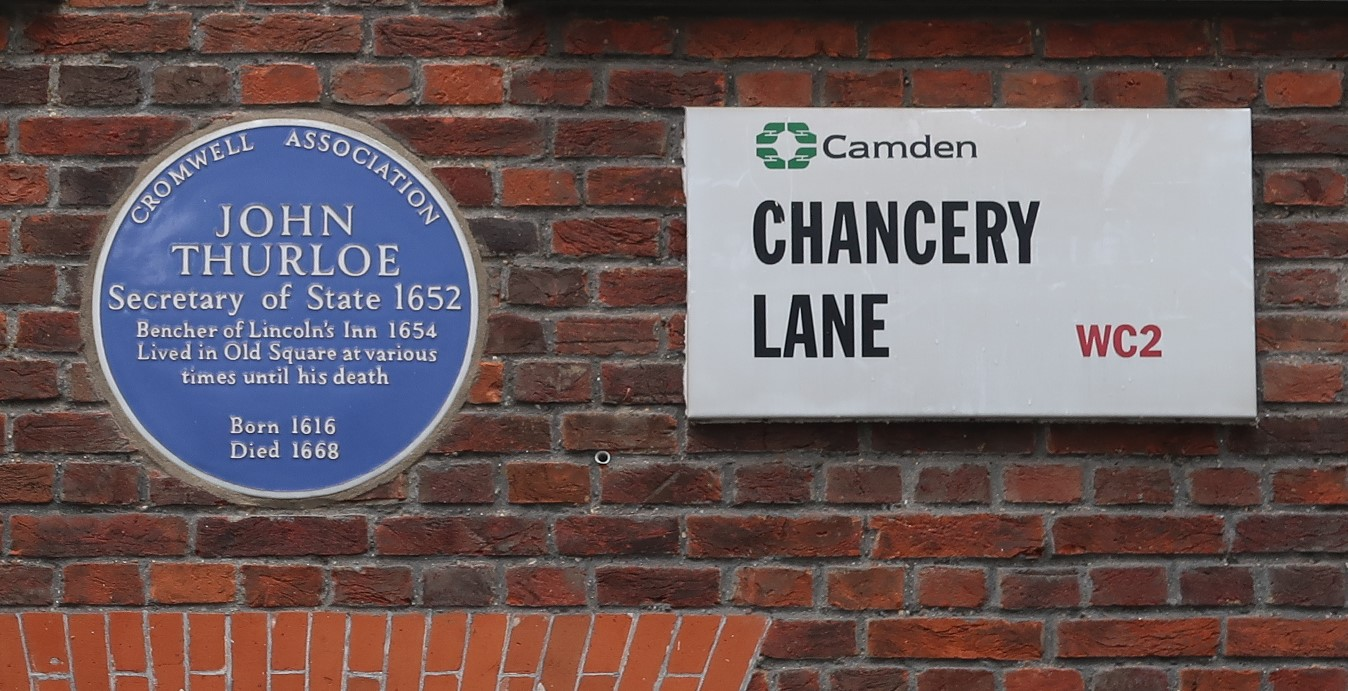
Blue plaque to John Thurloe in Chancery Lane near Lincoln's Inn in London erected by the Cromwell Association

Apart from building his mansion in Wisbech, in 1658 he gave £50 to purchase books for the Public library and contributed eighty-one volumes and £50 for making a road 'from the corn market to the little sluice' and £150, the interest to be applied towards putting out poor children apprentice. A portrait of Thurloe was presented to Wisbech & Fenland Museum by D.Gurney in 1847. A photograph of this is held on the National Portrait Gallery website. There is a Thurloe Close in Wisbech. Two of his portraits now in the local museum are in the online BBC collection.

== Fictional portrayals ==
- He is a recurring character in the Thomas Chaloner series of mystery novels by Susanna Gregory, which show him in a favourable light.
- He is a recurring character in the Edmund Godfrey series of mystery novels by Mark Francis, which show him as an eminence grise behind Restoration politics.
- He is one of the key characters in Robert Wilton's historical novel Traitor's Field, published on 1 May 2013 (UK) by Corvus, an imprint of Atlantic Books.
- He is a recurring character in the BBC television series By the Sword Divided, portrayed by actor David Collings
- He, Samuel Morland, and John Wallis are featured in the historical novel An Instance of the Fingerpost, by Iain Pears.
- He is a character in the play Cromwell, by Victor Hugo.
- He is a recurring character in "The Seeker" historical crime series by S. G. MacLean.
- Thurloe is a character in the 1998 Doctor Who novel The Roundheads by Mark Gatiss
