= James F. Sullivan =

American sailor (1857–1917)

- Born: Michael J. Garvey; May 1857; Lowell, Massachusetts, US
- Died: March 17, 1917 (aged 59); Lowell, Massachusetts, US
- Burial place: Saint Patrick Cemetery, Lowell Massachusetts
- Military career
- Allegiance: United States of America
- Branch: United States Navy
- Rank: Boatswain's Mate
- Unit: USS New Hampshire
- Awards: Medal of Honor

James F. Sullivan (1857–1917) was a United States Navy sailor and a recipient of the United States military's highest decoration, the Medal of Honor.

== Biography ==
Born in 1857 in Lowell, Massachusetts, Sullivan joined the Navy from that state. By April 21, 1882, he was serving as a boatswain's mate on the training ship USS New Hampshire. On that day, while New Hampshire was at Newport, Rhode Island, he and another sailor, Chief Boatswain's Mate Jeremiah Troy, jumped overboard and rescued Third Class Boy Francis T. Price from drowning. For this action, both Sullivan and Troy were awarded the Medal of Honor two and a half years later, on October 18, 1884.

Sullivan's official Medal of Honor citation reads:

For jumping overboard from the U.S. Training Ship New Hampshire, at Newport, R.I., 21 April 1882, and rescuing from drowning Francis T. Price, third class boy.

== See also ==
- List of Medal of Honor recipients during peacetime
