= Saveup =

SaveUp
- Available in: English
- Dissolved: November 29, 2017; 8 years ago
- Headquarters: Lake Forest, Illinois
- Area served: United States
- Founders: Priya Haji, Sammy Shreibati
- Website: www.saveup.com
- Launched: November 2011; 15 years ago
- Current status: Defunct

SaveUp was a free financial management site and iOS app that used prizes to incentivize Americans to save money and pay down debt. The company was founded in 2011 by Priya Haji and Sammy Shreibati. Haji died of a brain aneurysm soon after and Paul Burt purchased the app in 2015. It has partnered with the thinktank Filene Research Institute. SaveUp raised $7 million in funding from BlueRun Ventures and True Ventures.

SaveUp monitored account balances in order to issue credits. Credits, similar to reward points, were awarded every time a user saves money or reduces debt, and can be used for the chance at cash and prizes. It was listed as one of 2011's Top 100 websites by PCMag.

== Bankruptcy ==
SaveUp Inc. filed for bankruptcy in the United States District Court for the Northern District of Illinois on November 29, 2017 and shut down.
