= Anna Manning =

- Education: University of Toronto
- Occupation: Chief Executive Officer of Reinsurance Group of America

Anna Manning is the former Chief Executive Officer of Reinsurance Group of America, Incorporated, and a former member of the company's Board of Directors. She assumed the role of CEO on January 1, 2017, and of President in December 2015. Anna Manning left her post effective December 31, 2023.

== Career ==
Prior to joining RGA, Manning spent 19 years with the Toronto office of Towers Perrin's Tillinghast insurance consulting service. She provided consulting services to the insurance industry in mergers and acquisitions, value-added performance measurement, product development, and financial reporting. Manning joined Reinsurance Group of America in 2007. From 2008 until 2011, Manning served as Executive Vice President and Chief Operating Officer for RGA's International Division, overseeing the division's marketing, pricing, underwriting, claims, and administration. In 2011, she became Executive Vice President and Head of U.S. Markets and later assumed responsibility for Latin American markets. In 2014, Anna was named Senior Executive Vice President of Global Structured Solutions, overseeing the company's transactional businesses.

== Education ==
Manning received a Bachelor of Science (B.Sc.) degree in Actuarial Science from the University of Toronto.

== Board memberships ==
Manning is a Fellow of the Society of Actuaries and the Canadian Institute of Actuaries. She has served as a member of the American Council of Life Insurers Financial Services Steering Committee and the ACLI's Reinsurance Executive Roundtable Program Committee.
