= Scott Manning =

Canadian aerobatic pilot (1958–2006)

Personal information
- Nationality: Canadian
- Born: 15 May 1958
- Died: 16 June 2006 (aged 48)
- Home town: Kitchener, Ontario

Sport
- Country: Canada
- Sport: Football
- University team: Waterloo Warriors

Scott Manning (15 May 1958 – 16 June 2006) was a Canadian aerobatic pilot of the world's smallest jet, the BD-5J.

He grew up in Kitchener, Ontario, and earned a degree in environmental studies at the University of Waterloo in 1985. Having played for four years on the Waterloo Warriors football team, he pursued a career in professional football, at a weight of 290 lbs. and 6'3". In the 1980s, he attended training camps with the Saskatchewan Roughriders and the Montreal Alouettes. Scott pursued his football career until a serious knee injury caused a blood clot that almost killed him and rendered him incapable of continuing in the sport. Although told by doctors that he would probably never walk again, Manning slowly regained his mobility.

After two years of recovery, Manning decided that he simply "wanted to fly jets in airshows" and set out pursuing private and commercial pilot's licences and eventually earned flight time in some of the world's most advanced aerobatic aircraft.

In 1990 he purchased and decided to construct "The Stinger" BD-5J Microjet airplane kit. Construction work took over 6000 work hours. At the end of several engine malfunctions, and technical hiccups, his BD-5J emerged as a small competitor in the airshow circuit and aerobatics arena. Manning piloted his own plane, and was known as the tallest BD-5 pilot in the world, and the operator of the only BD-5J model in Canada.

On 16 June 2006 at 12:14 pm Manning was piloting his BD-5J when he crashed and was killed during practice for the Ottawa Air Show. The Canadian Transportation Safety Board issued its final Aviation Investigation Report A06O0141 on Manning's accident on 2 May 2007. The report stated one 'finding' as to the causes and contributing factors of this accident:

"The right flap was incorrectly installed during the wing installation, which allowed the right flap to retract during the fly-past. This created a flap asymmetry that resulted in an uncommanded right roll. The aircraft was at an attitude from which recovery was not possible before the aircraft struck the ground."

The report also stated two 'Findings as to Risk':

1. "The right-wing taper bolt did not penetrate deep enough through the spars to engage the fibre locking feature of the locknut. Therefore, the taper bolt was not in safety at the time of the accident."
2. "The fibre locking feature of the left-wing locknut was worn and did not secure the left-wing taper bolt in safety."

== See also ==
- List of University of Waterloo people
