= PoLAR =

- Discipline: Anthropology, law
- Language: English
- Edited by: Deepa Das Acevedo (Emory University)

Publication details
- Former names: Political Anthropology Letter; Association for Political and Legal Anthropology Newsletter; Newsletter of the Association for Political and Legal Anthropology; APLA Newsletter
- History: 1973–present
- Publisher: John Wiley & Sons on behalf of the American Anthropological Association
- Frequency: Biannually

Standard abbreviations
- ISO 4: PoLAR

Indexing
- ISSN: 1081-6976 (print); 1555-2934 (web)
- LCCN: 95660572
- JSTOR: polilegaanthrevi
- OCLC no.: 28253718

Links
- Journal homepage

PoLAR: Political and Legal Anthropology Review is a biannual academic journal and the official journal of the Association for Political and Legal Anthropology, which is a division of the American Anthropological Association.

== Focus ==
According to PoLAR's website, PoLAR

"is devoted to the anthropology of law and politics, most broadly conceived. This innovative interdisciplinary publication features articles on such issues as nationalism, citizenship, political and legal processes, the state, civil society, colonialism, postcolonial public spheres, multiculturalism, and media politics. It publishes work that is distinguished by its critical definition of problems, ethnographic orientation, or theoretical outlook."

== History ==
The journal was established in 1973 as the Political Anthropology Letter. In 1978 it became the Association for Political and Legal Anthropology Newsletter; in 1980 it was renamed the Newsletter of the Association for Political and Legal Anthropology. In 1987 it changed its name to the APLA Newsletter. It adopted its current name in 1993.
