= Jo Mary Manning =

New Zealand academic

Joanna Mary Manning
- Education: George Washington University
- Scientific career
- Fields: Medical ethics
- Workplaces: University of Auckland

Joanna Mary Manning is a New Zealand academic, and a full professor in the Faculty of Law at the University of Auckland.

== Academic career ==
After an undergraduate at University of Auckland, Manning did a Masters at George Washington University and worked as a prosecutor before returning to academia at Auckland, rising to full professor.

Manning has held a number of roles relating to medical ethics, including with the Medical Practitioners Disciplinary Committee, National Ethics Advisory Committee and Scientific Advisory Committee of the Heart Foundation NZ. She has also edited a source book on one of New Zealand's biggest medical ethics controversies, the Cartwright Inquiry.

== Selected works ==
- Manning, Joanna, ed. The Cartwright Papers: Essays on the Cervical Cancer Inquiry, 1987–88. Bridget Williams Books, 2009.
