= Religion on the Line =

Religion on the Line is the name of a number of local talk radio programs in the United States, where a variety of clergy members discuss religious and other topics. On WABC in New York, it is hosted by Rabbi Joseph Potasnik and Deacon Kevin McCormack. On KCMO in Kansas City, it is hosted by Reverend Robert Lee Hill, Chancellor George M. Noonan, and Rabbi Emeritus Michael Zedek, since 1992. In Chicago it aired on WIND (AM).

On KABC in Los Angeles, Lou Cook was one of the original hosts, and Carole Hemingway hosted this show from 1974 to 1982. Starting in 1982, it was hosted by Dennis Prager, and had the top ratings when it aired on Sunday nights. Prager hosted for over ten years. In 1994–95, Truman Jacques hosted. KABC ran the show until 1997, when they ran other programming in its Sunday night time slot. Among other hosts at KABC were Ira Fistell. Hemingway attempted to start a show of the same name at competing station KGIL.

These shows inspired the similar "A Show of Faith" in Houston.
