= Lisa Servon =

American professor

Lisa J. Servon is an American professor who holds the position of chair of the City and Regional Planning Department at the University of Pennsylvania. She specializes in studies of urban poverty, community development, economic development, and issues of gender. She is one of the primary faculty in the Community and Economic Development concentration. Her research has explored economic insecurity, consumer financial services, and financial justice.

Servon received a Bachelor of Arts in political science from Bryn Mawr College and went on to earn a Master of Arts in history of art from the University of Pennsylvania. Her Ph.D. is in urban planning from the University of California, Berkeley.

Prior to joining the faculty at PennDesign, Servon was a professor of management and urban policy at The New School. She also served as dean at the Milano School of International Affairs, Management, and Urban Policy. In addition to several books (see below), Servon has contributed to The New Yorker, The Atlantic, and The Wall Street Journal. She has also appeared on PBS News Hour, Marketplace Money, and Radio Times. Her research is also featured in the documentary Spent: Looking for Change.

Servon's most recent work focuses on alternatives to traditional banks used by many Americans, including check cashers and payday lenders. Servon worked as a teller for several months at both a check casher and a payday lender seeking to shed light on why people are turning away from banks. The resulting work is called The Unbanking of America: How the New Middle Class Survives.

== Major publications ==
- The Unbanking of America: How the New Middle Class Survives (Houghton Mifflin Harcourt, 2017)
- Otra Vida es Posible: Prácticas Económicas Alternativas Durante la Crisis - With Manuel Castells, Joana Conill, Amalia Cardenas and Sviatlana Hlebik (Universitat Oberta de Catalunya Press, 2012)
- Gender and Planning: A Reader - With Susan Fainstein (Rutgers University Press, 2005)
- Bridging the Digital Divide: Technology, Community, and Public Policy (Blackwell, 2002)
- Bootstrap Capital: Microenterprises and the American Poor (Brookings, 1999)
