= Rosie Manning =

American football player (born 1950)

No. 77, 65
- Position: Defensive tackle

Personal information
- Born: May 31, 1950 (age 76); Wichita Falls, Texas, U.S.
- Listed height: 6 ft 5 in (1.96 m)
- Listed weight: 256 lb (116 kg)

Career information
- High school: Wichita Falls (TX) Washington
- College: Northeastern State
- NFL draft: 1972: 2nd round, 42nd overall pick

Career history
- Atlanta Falcons (1972–1975); Philadelphia Eagles (1975); Washington Redskins (1976)*
- * Offseason or practice squad member only
- Stats at Pro Football Reference

Roosevelt "Rosie" Manning, Jr. (born May 31, 1950) is an American former professional football defensive tackle who played four seasons in the National Football League (NFL) with the Atlanta Falcons and Philadelphia Eagles. He was selected by the Falcons in the second round of the 1972 NFL draft after playing college football at Northeastern State University.

== Early life and college ==
Roosevelt Manning, Jr. was born on May 31, 1950, in Wichita Falls, Texas. He attended Booker T. Washington High School in Wichita Falls.

He was a member of the Northeastern State RiverHawks football team from 1968 to 1971.

== Professional career ==
Manning was selected by the Atlanta Falcons in the second round, with the 42nd overall pick, of the 1972 NFL draft. He officially signed with the team on March 11. He played in three games for the Falcons in 1972, one game in 1973, eight games in 1974, and two games in 1975. Manning was released by the Falcons on October 2, 1975.

He signed with the Philadelphia Eagles on October 17, 1975, and played in ten games for the Eagles during the 1975 NFL season, recording one sack. He was released on August 2, 1976.

Manning signed with the Washington Redskins in 1977 but was later released on July 31, 1977.
