= Reinsurance Group of America =

Global reinsurance company

Reinsurance Group of America, Incorporated (RGA)
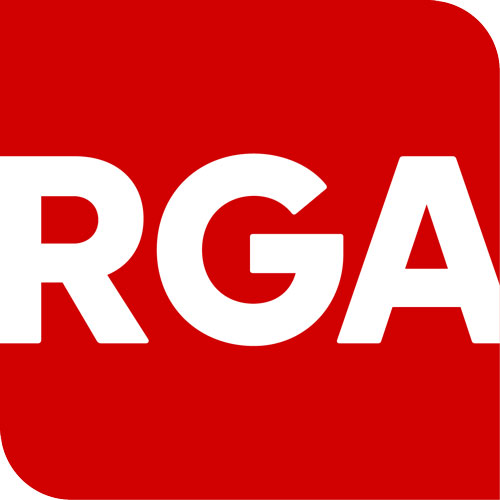
- Type: Public
- Traded as: NYSE: RGA; S&P 400 Component
- ISIN: US7593516047
- Industry: Reinsurance
- Founded: 1973
- Headquarters: Chesterfield, Missouri, United States
- Key people: Tony Cheng (CEO)
- Products: biometric solutions (life reinsurance, living benefits reinsurance, health reinsurance, longevity reinsurance) and financial solutions (asset-intensive reinsurance, pension risk transfer, capital-motivated reinsurance)
- Revenue: ▲US$23.7 billion (2025)
- Net income: ▲US$1.18 billion (2025)
- Total assets: ▲US$156.6 billion (2025)
- Number of employees: ~4,800 (2026)
- Parent: Reinsurance Group of America
- Website: www.rgare.com

Reinsurance Group of America, Incorporated (NYSE: RGA) is a holding company for a global life and health reinsurance entity based in Greater St. Louis within the western suburb of Chesterfield, Missouri, United States. With approximately $4.3 trillion of life reinsurance in force and total assets of $156.6 billion as of December 31, 2025, RGA has grown to become the only international company to focus primarily on life and health-related reinsurance.

== History ==
General American Reinsurance, a reinsurance division formed in 1973 by General American Life Insurance Company (GA), was the forerunner to RGA. By 1993, GA's reinsurance division had grown its life reinsurance in force to $114.7 billion. General American acquired the life reinsurance business of National Reinsurance of Canada, later renamed General American Life Reinsurance Company of Canada, thereby establishing its first international office; the Canadian business became RGA Life Reinsurance Company of Canada after RGA's initial public offering (IPO).

Incorporated in 1992 in the state of Missouri, Reinsurance Group of America, Incorporated (RGA) was formed as a holding company for RGA's U.S. and Canadian reinsurance businesses. RGA was taken public by IPO in 1993 on the New York Stock Exchange (NYSE: RGA), with General American retaining a 65% share.

MetLife acquired General American in 2000, including its interest in RGA, and after 8 years of ownership, MetLife spun RGA off to become a fully independent company.

== Rankings and recognition ==
Ranked #193 on the 2026 Fortune 500 list, moving up 3 positions from its prior-year rank and reaching its highest position to date, RGA also was named to the 2026 Fortune's list of the "World's Most Admired Companies." In 2025, RGA was ranked #1 on NMG Consulting's Global All Respondent Business Capability Index (BCI) for the 15th consecutive year, based on feedback from insurance executives in more than 50 markets. RGA has earned this recognition every year since the inception of NMG's Global Life & Health Reinsurance Study.

== Products and services ==
RGA's products and services include life reinsurance, living benefits reinsurance, group reinsurance, health reinsurance, financial solutions, facultative underwriting, and product development. "CBInsights".
