= Joseph Potasnik =

American rabbi

Joseph Potasnik (born December 15, 1946) is a rabbi and radio show host. He currently serves as the executive vice president of the New York Board of Rabbis.

== Biography and education ==
Raised in Lynn, Massachusetts, Potasnik is the only child of two Holocaust survivors. His Jewish parents, mother Anne, and father Herman, who met after World War II and have both died, very rarely spoke to him about the loss of their families and their own grief. Potasnik believes this was to shelter him from the ordeal.

Potasnik graduated from Yeshiva University in 1972 and continued on to receive a master's degree from Bernard Revel Graduate School of Jewish Studies, a division of YU. He then obtained a law degree from Brooklyn Law School.

Potasnik officiated at the wedding of Brooklyn Borough President Marty Markowitz.

Potasnik is divorced. He has one son.

== Career ==
Potasnik is the rabbi emeritus at Congregation Mt. Sinai in Brooklyn Heights, New York.

In December 2019, he published his book based on the one-minute sermons he gives on 1010-WINS in New York. It's called Just Give Me a Minute, published by The Wordsmithy, LLC (www.justgivemeaminute.net).

Together with Rev. AR Bernard, Potasnik co-hosts The Rev and The Rabbi on WABC Talk Radio 77 in New York since 2018. Previously he co-hosted Religion on the Line show since its inception in 1982. He is the religious commentator for 1010-WINS radio.

He serves as FDNY and Fraternal Order of Police chaplains. Beginning from the first days after September 11, Potasnik has continued to serve as a counselor to many of the surviving family members of firefighters and other first respondents who were killed that day.In October 2025, the FDNY promoted Potasnik to be its Chief Chaplain.

In response to a post by New York City mayor Zohran Mamdani on October 7, 2026, the third anniversary of the October 7 attacks, which was perceived as downplaying Jewish grief by focusing on the impact on Palestinians in Gaza, Potasnik said that there were would always be appropriate opportunities to address different opinions, but that "This is a day of mourning for us. Just give us that day."
