= James A. Wilcox =

James A. Wilcox is an American economist. He currenetly works at CRA International and is a research fellow at Filene Research Institute, and previously was the James J. and Marianne B. Lowery Chair and professor of economics at Haas School of Business, University of California, Berkeley.

Wilcox obtained his Ph.D. in economics from Northwestern University and BA in history and economics from Binghamton University. From 1990 to 1991, Wilcox was a senior economist at the Council of Economic Advisers during last term of President George H. W. Bush. He then served as an economist for the Federal Reserve Board and from 1999 to 2001 was a chief economist at the Office of the Comptroller of the Currency in Washington, D.C. After becoming a fellow of Wharton Financial Institutions Center in 2003, Wilcox chaired the Economic Analysis and Policy Group from 2012 to 2015 and from 2014 to 2016 was member of board of directors of VirtualBeam. Since 2012 he also serves on member of board of directors of Finance Scholars Group and since 2016 is a member of the Financial Economists Roundtable.
