= Michael Manning (priest) =

American Roman Catholic priest

Michael John Manning (December 30, 1940 – December 14, 2016) was an American Roman Catholic priest whose ministry was television.

His program, The Word in the World, is seen weekly on The Church Channel. His programs also broadcast on Catholic television stations in Rockville Centre, Yonkers, Youngstown and Fresno. Manning is also aired on the worldwide Military Network. In 1972 Manning began his ministry by hosting and producing the program "Run for Daylight" on a cable system in San Bernardino, California. In 1978 he started a nationally syndicated weekly program.

Born in Muncie, Indiana in 1940, Manning died on December 14, 2016, from brain cancer.

Manning's goal was to present Catholic perspectives on life's issues. He had a driving desire to build bridges among people of different Christian denominations and religions. He championed the causes of the poor and disenfranchised. His teachings brought insights into the Bible and the Catholic faith.

Manning appeared as a guest on Larry King Live, The Tonight Show with Jay Leno, Nancy Grace, The History Channel, Doctor Laura, The Leeza Show, The Montel Williams Show, The Phil Donahue Show, Hard Copy, Helpline at NBC and CBS Real People, The 700 Club, and Today's Religion. For nine years he was a regular guest on the radio program Religion on the Line on KABC in Los Angeles with Dennis Prager.

== Writing ==
Manning wrote several books and booklets, including Pardon My Lenten Smile, Proclaimed from the Rooftops, Life full of Surprises, the autobiography On Camera and Off, The Story of my Life, Questions and Answers for Today's Catholics, "Sackcloth and Ashes: Liturgical Reflections for Lenten Weekdays" and Why do Catholics Leave the Church? For seven years he wrote a weekly column in the Los Angeles Herald Examiner. He was the playwright and wrote the script for a live musical on the life of Saint Paul, called "Paul". "Paul" was performed at four locations throughout Southern California in 2009. His most recent book is 5 Seconds a Day to a Successful Marriage. In 2010 Doubleday released The 15 Faces of God – A quest to know the Father from the Parables of Jesus.

== Career and education ==
In Manning's 47 years of priesthood he served as high school teacher, vocation director, provincial superior, prison chaplain, pastor and president of the television ministry, Wordnet Productions. Manning received a B.A. degree in Philosophy from New York State University in Albany, New York in 1963. He received a Theology degree from Catholic University of America in Washington D.C. in 1969. He then received an M.F.A. (Masters of Fine Arts) degree in playwriting from Catholic University of America in 1972. In addition to his media work, he was a speaker at national and international conventions.

== Awards and recognition ==
In May 2006 Manning was the recipient of the Papal award Pro Ecclesia Et Pontifice from Pope Benedict XVI, given to "individuals whose contributions rise to a level that deserves recognition by the Universal Church."

Manning was a member of the Society of the Divine Word (Latin: Societas Verbi Divini: SVD), an international missionary community that serves the needs of the poor.

== Controversy and return to ministry ==
In April, 2011 Manning announced a one-month leave from his television show as a result of the revelation that he was involved in an inappropriate relation with his second cousin, Nancy Kotowski, the Monterey County, California superintendent of schools.

As of May 13, 2011, with the full support of his Provincial Superior of the Western Province of Society of the Divine Word and the Bishop of San Bernardino, Fr. Manning had returned to full active ministry. The weekly show on the Trinity Broadcasting Network (TBN), as well as the daily smart phone app, iGodToday, sponsored by the Vatican Observatory, was resumed.

== Sources ==
- http://www.tbn.org/watch-us/our-programs/the-word-in-the-world-hosted-by-father-michael-manning Father Manning on TBN
- https://web.archive.org/web/20091111163456/http://www.svdvocations.org/getdoc/8478a90c-6dd2-426c-9331-04c06b34413f/Fr--Michael-Manning,-SVD.aspx Divine Word Missionaries
- http://www.randomhouse.com/catalog/display.pperl?isbn=9780385531610 "15 Faces of God Book" published by DoubleDay, written by Father Michael Manning
- http://transcripts.cnn.com/TRANSCRIPTS/0303/11/lkl.00.html CNN Larry King Interview
- http://www.usccb.org/video/reflections.shtml United States Conference Catholic Bishops' Fr. Manning daily Reading Reflections
- http://www.nmtv.org/announcements/pope-honors-fr-michael-manning-of-the-word-in-the-world-on-tbn Pope honors Father Michael Manning
- http://transcripts.cnn.com/TRANSCRIPTS/0112/01/lklw.00.html CNN Larry King Live Interview "Can Three Ancient Religions Peacefully Coexist?" Aired December 1, 2001 21:00 ET
- http://transcripts.cnn.com/TRANSCRIPTS/0504/01/lkl.01.html CNN Larry King Live Interview "Panel discusses the Life of Pope John Paul II" Aired April 1, 2005 21:00 ET
