= Robert D. Manning =

American economist

Robert D. Manning (born 1957) is a former financial advisor in consumer credit and financial services. Up until 2008, Manning was a professor of finance at Rochester Institute of Technology's E. Philip Saunders College of Business.

== Education ==
Manning has a BA from Duke University, a master's degree from Northern Illinois University, Economic History and Latin American Studies (1981) and a Ph.D. from The Johns Hopkins University, Program in Comparative International Development (1989).

== Career ==
He also specializes in U.S. and global banking deregulation, consumer debt, macro-economic trends in consumer economy, and U.S. labor market trends. He is also an authority on U.S. social inequality, Mexican economic development, immigration to the U.S., small business entrepreneurship, urban development issues, race and ethnic relations, and higher education financing.

Manning has been interviewed on the topic of consumer debt on CNN’s In the Money, NPR’s To the Point, CBS Evening News and Money Magazine — as well as making guest appearances on The Al Franken Show. Manning is the author of Credit Card Nation, and a recent in-depth study, “Living With Debt” sponsored by LendingTree.com, and is featured in Danny Schechter’s documentary, “In Debt We Trust”, which was released in summer 2006.

Manning is a fellow at the Filene Research Institute.

== Bankruptcy ==
In June 2020 Manning filed for bankruptcy in the Western District of New York.

== Works ==
- Credit Card Nation, Basic Books, 2000.
- Living with Debt, 2005.
