= Cold, Cold Heart (band) =

British post rock band

Cold, Cold Heart is a British post rock band. Their music is composed and performed by multi-instrumentalists Robert Manning, Chris Daniel, Gareth Jones and Alex Wilson. The band typically compose lengthy, cinematic guitar-based instrumental pieces.

They made their UK national radio debut with Gideon Coe on BBC Radio 6 Music, and were subsequently featured on Amazing Radio and WFUV. The band's debut album, How the Other Half Live and Die, was released on 12 March 2016 on Fluttery Records, as exclusively reported by Coe on his BBC show. In 2018, Cold, Cold Heart returned with an EP called Arch, released on 17 May 2018 once again on Fluttery Records.

== Discography ==
=== Singles ===
- "Stand/still" (2014)
- "Wolf Eyes, You're Staring" (2014)
- "Megan" (2015)
- "Wake Up in Blue" (2017)
- "Katie, My Queen" (2019)

=== Albums ===
- How the Other Half Live and Die (2016)

=== EPs ===
- Arch (2018)

== Band members ==
- Robert Manning
- Chris Daniel
- Gareth Jones
- Alex Wilson

contributors

- Simone Potter - viola
- Bethany Pozzi-Johnson - vocals
- Mary Leay - vocals

== See also ==
- List of post-rock bands
