= Joanne LaCourse =

American laser scientist

Joanne S. LaCourse (also written as Joanne La Course and published as Joanne Snare and Joanne S. Manning) is an American laser scientist associated with GTE. She earned her PhD in physics in 1977 from the University of North Carolina at Chapel Hill with the dissertation Superconducting Transition Temperatures and Residual Resistivities of Highly Disordered Lanthanum-Gold Films and was named a Fellow of the IEEE in 1995, "for contributions to the understanding of dynamic characteristics of semiconductor lasers". She was vice-president for membership of the IEEE Lasers and Electro-Optics Society in 1995.
