= David Manning (police officer) =

Papua New Guinea police officer

David Manning MBE
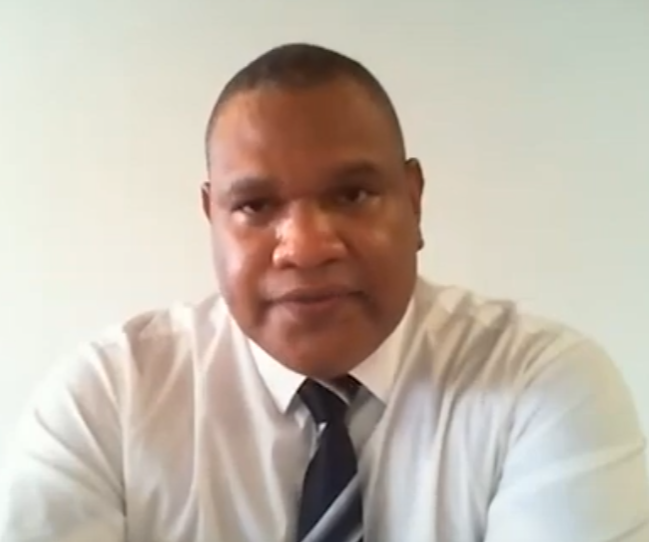
- In a Lowy Institute online discussion in 2021

Controller of COVID-19 pandemic, Papua New Guinea
- Incumbent
- Assumed office 2020

Papua New Guinean Commissioner of Police
- Incumbent
- Assumed office 2019

Deputy Police Commissioner
- In office 2019–2019

David Manning MBE is the Commissioner of Police in Papua New Guinea (PNG). From early 2020 he was also designated as the country's Pandemic Controller in response to the COVID-19 outbreak.

== Early life and education ==
David Manning is the son of Michael J. Manning, an economist and anti-corruption campaigner who was born in Australia and became a naturalized citizen of PNG, and Relly Manning, from East New Britain in PNG. His grandfather, Alan Manning, was one of the founders of the Democratic Labor Party in Australia. Between 1988 and 1993, Manning was educated at Canberra Grammar School. He then studied for a year at the Papua New Guinea University of Technology. His lack of tertiary qualifications was later to cause him difficulties.

== Career ==
Manning rose rapidly through the ranks of the Royal Papua New Guinea Constabulary (RPNGC). In 2008 he was appointed as director of the Special Services Division, a unit within the force that has responsibility throughout the country, unlike other police units, which are restricted to certain areas of operation. From 2013 to 2015, he served as security coordinator for the 2015 Pacific Games, which were held in PNG's capital, Port Moresby in July of that year. After that, he was made assistant commissioner of operations, being promoted to deputy commissioner in 2019. In December 2019, seven months after being made a deputy commissioner he was appointed as Commissioner of Police.

Manning's appointment to the top position was challenged in the courts by two of the candidates who had failed to be selected for the post. They argued that the post of commissioner required a university degree and that Manning lacked this. Their initial challenge, in January 2021, was successful and Manning was ordered by the judge to vacate the post. He was subsequently allowed to stay in post pending a Supreme Court of Papua New Guinea review of the decision by the lower court judge. In December 2021, the Supreme Court found in Manning's favour. The issue revolved around the fact that two posts had been advertised together, that of Police Commissioner, for which tertiary qualifications were not a requirement, and that of Secretary of State for the Police, for which they were. The expectation of PNG's Public Service Commission was that one person would fill both posts. However, the Supreme Court of Papua New Guinea found that the position of head or secretary of the department of police had no constitutional and statutory foundation in law and thus Manning's appointment as commissioner was legal.

In 2020, Manning was also appointed as controller of the COVID-19 pandemic, first with the title of emergency controller and then as the designated pandemic controller. This effectively gave him the power to issue all regulations necessary to try to control the pandemic within the country, including immigration controls, burial arrangements, movement controls, and other social restrictions. Controls on the sale of alcohol led to the death of a senior police officer in May 2020 when he intervened in a dispute between off-duty soldiers and a beer-shop owner. This event seemed likely to lead to a confrontation between the police and the military and was only avoided by a joint intervention by Manning and Brigadier General Gilbert Toropo, head of the Royal Papua New Guinean armed forces. Following the unrest in 2021 in neighbouring Solomon Islands, a contingent of PNG police was sent to the country as part of a Commonwealth peacekeeping force. In February 2022, Manning was forced to refute allegations that PNG police officers had behaved inappropriately.
