= David Franklin Manning =

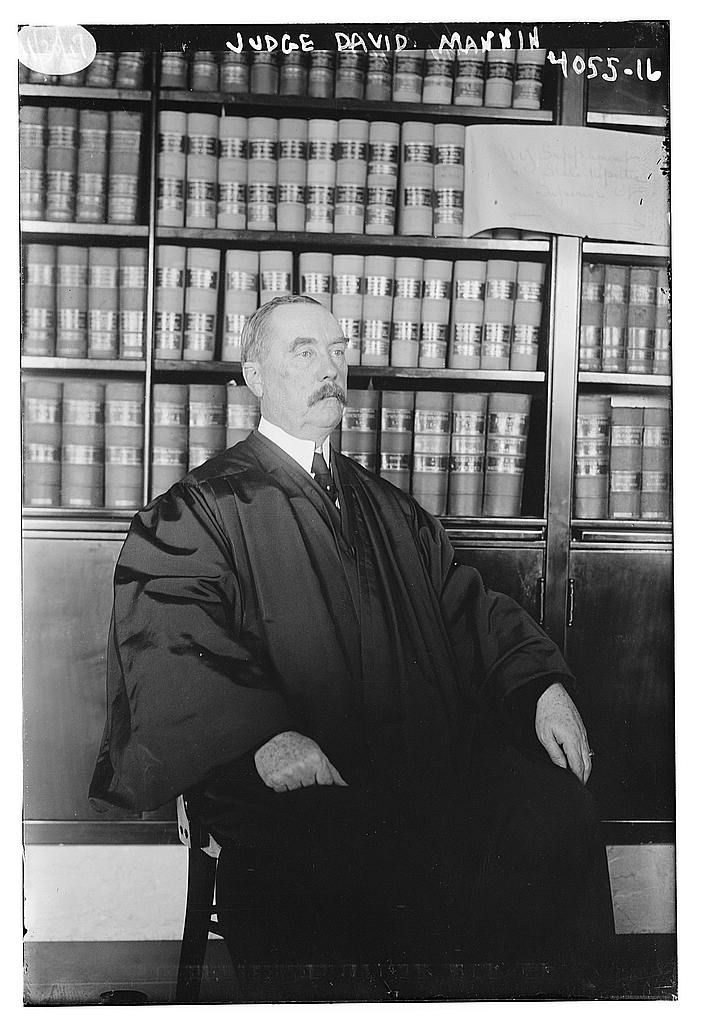
Judge David Manning in 1916

David Franklin Manning (May 1, 1857 - January 18, 1929) was a justice of the New York Supreme Court. He was president of the Brooklyn Bar Association and the vice president of the New York State Bar Association.

== Biography ==
He was born on May 1, 1857, or May 2, 1857, in Clonmel in Ireland to Peter F. Manning. He emigrated to the United States in 1867. He married Mary G. M. in 1879. They had two sons.

He attended law school and practiced law in Brooklyn. In October 1912, he was elected as a justice for the New York Supreme Court. In 1921, he was moved to the Appellate Division of the New York Supreme Court, Second Judicial Department by Governor Nathan Lewis Miller. He retired from the bench in 1927 when he reached the mandatory retirement age of 70.

He died in Brooklyn, New York City, on January 18, 1929.
