= Robert Manning (priest) =

English Catholic priest (1655–1731)

Robert Manning (1655 in Amsterdam – 4 March 1731 in Ingatestone Hall) was an English Roman Catholic priest and controversialist.

== Biography ==
Born to an English mother and Dutch father, Robert Manning entered the English College, Douai in 1668, and later taught humanities and philosophy there. Ordained priest in 1690, he was sent to the English mission in 1692, becoming chaplain to Lord Petre and other members of the Petre family at Ingatestone Hall.

Manning produced a string of polemical works that rank him as one of the leading figures in that silver age of English Catholic controversial writing.

He died in Essex on 4 March 1731.

== Works ==
- Modern Controversy, 1720
- The Case Stated between the Church of Rome and the Church of England (Volume 1, Volume 2), 1721.
- The Reform'd Churches Proved Destitute of a Lawful Ministry: to Which is Added the Antiquity of the Doctrine Call'd Popery, Rouen, 1722.
- England's Conversion and Reformation Compared, Antwerp: R.C. and C.F., 1725
- Moral Entertainments, 1742
- The Celebrated Answer to the Rev. C. Lesley's Case Stated, Between the Church of Rome and the Church of England: Printed Word for Word, and Refuted Sentence After Sentence , Dublin: R. Coyne, 1839.
- The Shortest Way to End Disputes About Religion: in Two Parts, Boston: P. Donahoe, 1855.
