= Amos R. Manning =

American judge (1810–1880)

Amos R. Manning (1810–1880) was a justice of the Supreme Court of Alabama from 1874 to 1880.

Born in Amboy, New Jersey, his family moved to Huntsville, Alabama. He became an Associate Judge of the Supreme Court of Alabama in the 1870s, where "[h]is opinions were remarkable for care and research".

Manning was elected to the court in the general election of 1874, and served until his death.
