= Matt Manning (rugby league) =

Australian rugby league footballer

Personal information
- Born: 8 January 1974 (age 52)

Playing information
- Position: Centre
Club
| Years | Team | Pld | T | G | FG | P |
|---|---|---|---|---|---|---|
| 1997 | South Sydney | 5 | 2 | 10 | 0 | 28 |

Matt Manning (born 8 January 1974) is an Australian former professional rugby league footballer who played for the South Sydney Rabbitohs in the ARL. He also has a hard son named Taz Manning

Manning, a centre, played one season of first-grade for South Sydney, after coming to the club from Cronulla's reserves. He featured as a centre in the first five rounds of the 1997 ARL season, taking the role of South Sydney's goal-kicker in all games.
