= Phil Manning (footballer) =

Australian rules footballer

Personal information
- Full name: Phillip Charles Manning
- Born: 9 October 1906; Buln Buln, Victoria
- Died: 4 November 1930 (aged 24); Melbourne, Victoria
- Original team: Mentone

Playing career^{1}
Years	Club	Games (Goals)
1927	Hawthorn	2 (1)
- ^{1} Playing statistics correct to the end of 1927.

Phillip Charles Manning (9 October 1906 – 4 November 1930) was an Australian rules footballer who played with Hawthorn in the Victorian Football League (VFL).

Manning, a student of Xavier College, came to Hawthorn from Mentone. He played in the final two rounds of the 1927 VFL season, against Melbourne and Richmond.

On 4 November 1930, Manning was the passenger of a motor cycle which struck a parked wagon on Balcombe Road in Mentone. He was admitted to Alfred Hospital with a fractured skull and died later that day.
