= Henry J. Manning =

- Born: 17 September 1859; New Haven, Connecticut, US
- Died: Unknown
- Military career
- Allegiance: United States
- Branch: United States Navy
- Rank: Quartermaster
- Unit: USS New Hampshire
- Awards: Medal of Honor

Henry J. Manning (born 17 September 1859, date of death unknown) was a United States Navy sailor and a recipient of the United States military's highest decoration, the Medal of Honor.

== Biography ==
Little is known of Manning's early life. His Navy enlistment record lists his birthdate as September 17, 1859 and birthplace as New Haven, Connecticut.

Manning enlisted in the Navy in Baltimore, Maryland on March 8, 1876. His initial rank was "2nd class boy" and his original service expiration date was September 17, 1880 - his 21st birthday. (Prior to the Second World War, the Navy offered minority enlistments in which a young man could be enlisted until his 21st birthday when he would reach the legal age of majority and could decide for himself if he wished to continue his career in the Navy.) His physical description was that he was five foot two and one half inches tall, grey eyes, dark brown hair and dark complexion.

By January 4, 1882, he was serving as a quartermaster on the training ship USS New Hampshire. On that day, while New Hampshire was off Coaster's Harbor Island in Newport, Rhode Island, he and another sailor, Ship's Printer John McCarton, jumped overboard in an attempt to save Second Class Musician Jabez Smith from drowning. For this action, both Manning and McCarton were awarded the Medal of Honor two and a half years later, on October 18, 1884.

Manning's official Medal of Honor citation reads:

Serving on board the U.S. Training Ship New Hampshire, off Newport, R.I., 4 January 1882. Jumping overboard, Manning endeavored to rescue Jabez Smith, second class musician, from drowning.

Nothing is known of Manning's life after his receiving the Medal of Honor.

== See also ==
- List of Medal of Honor recipients during peacetime
