= Bob Manning (pop singer) =

American big band singer (1926–1997)

- Born: Manny Levin; February 1, 1926; Philadelphia, Pennsylvania, U.S.
- Died: October 23, 1997 (aged 71) Los Angeles, California, U.S.
- Genre: Big Band
- Occupation: Singer
- Labels: Capitol Records; Apollo Records

Bob Manning (born Manny Levin; February 1, 1926 – October 23, 1997) was an American big band singer who was popular in the 1950s, and well known through his radio and television appearances.

== Biography ==
Manning was born Manny Levin on February 1, 1926, in Philadelphia, Pennsylvania, into a Jewish family. He began singing professionally for Jewish weddings and nightclubs at the age of fifteen.

Manning was first spotted on Arthur Godfrey's Talent Scouts and first gained notice as Ziggy Elman's vocalist after first touring with local bands and singing on local radio stations. He recorded for MGM Records with Elman and also with Art Mooney and Tommy Dorsey.

Manning was a featured singer on Rhythm on the Road, an hour-long weekly program on CBS in 1955.

In May 1954, Manning was a guest singer on Dave Garroway's television program.

Manning had hits as a soloist after signing with Capitol Records, most notably with a cover of Hoagy Carmichael and Ned Washington's The Nearness of You.

Manning's stepson is actor and voice artist Barry Gordon.

Manning died in Los Angeles, California of pneumonia on October 23, 1997, aged 71.

== Albums ==
- Lonely Spell (1955, Capitol)
- Our Wedding Songs (1958, Everest)
- Tommy Alexander Presents His Golden Trombones (1958, Everest; Manning on four tracks)

== Hit singles ==
Year	Single	US Chart position	label	catalog #
1953	"The Nearness of You"	16	Capitol	2383
1953	"All I Desire"	27	Capitol	2493
1954	"Venus De Milo"	29	Capitol	2694
