= Michael J. Manning =

Papua New Guinean anti-corruption activist and economist

Michael Manning
- Born: 1943; Sydney, New South Wales, Australia
- Died: 22 August 2008 (aged 64–65); Rabaul, East New Britain, Papua New Guinea
- Occupations: Public servant and economist
- Known for: Anti-corruption campaigner
- Spouse: Relly Manning

Michael John Manning OBE (1943 – 22 August 2008) was an Australian-born Papua New Guinean anti-corruption activist and economist. Manning served as the second Chairman of Transparency International PNG (TIPNG), one of Papua New Guinea's largest organizations dedicated to eradicating corruption, from 2003 until 2008. He was a naturalized citizen of Papua New Guinea.

== Early life ==
Manning was born in 1943 in Sydney, New South Wales, Australia, but raised in Coonabarabran, New South Wales. He was the son of Margot Manning and Alan Manning, one of the founders of the Democratic Labor Party.

Manning's father, Alan Manning, became a protégé and supporter of Ben Chifley and the Australian Labor Party (ALP) following his return from World War II. Alan Manning ran for office as an Australian Labor Party candidate three times, losing on each try. Manning's ALP affiliation did not sit well with others in rural Coonabarabran. The Manning family was eventually removed from their family farm by the ownership trust for "spending too much time in politics." Alan Manning and other ALP dissenters were expelled from the political party in 1956 after openly criticizing the "36 faceless men" of the ALP federal executive. In response to his expulsion, Alan Manning, a Protestant, joined the Democratic Labor Party, which was dominated by Catholics. Manning became the president of the Democratic Labor Party in New South Wales.

Manning contracted polio when he was just five years old. He spent one year inside an iron lung for treatment. He recovered from the disease. Manning went on to attend the King's School, Parramatta thanks to a trust fund set up by his grandfather, who was a wealthy grazier.

Manning left his university studies for five years after the death of his mother, Margot Manning. He returned to farming at a town near Canberra before moving to Rylstone, where he helped to raise his younger brothers.

He returned to university and received his bachelor's degree in economics from Australian National University in Canberra. He then obtained a job with the Australian Bureau of Agricultural and Resource Economics while he worked to obtain his master's degree in economics.

== Career ==
=== Papua New Guinea ===
Before he completed his master's degree, Manning was recruited to work as an employee for the newly independent government of Papua New Guinea, which gained independence from Australia in 1975. He relocated to Papua New Guinea in 1975. Manning first worked for the Papuan government ministry in charge of minerals and energy. He then moved to the finance ministry, where he oversaw the finances of all nineteen provincial governments. Manning was known to be thorough in his oversight of provincial finances, even threatening to shut down provincial governments who deviated from official policy.

Manning worked in a number of other positions within the Papua New Guinean public and private sectors throughout his career. He worked for many PNG consultancies and board of directors throughout the country. Much of his work, lectures and economic studies centered on the expansion of smallholder production within the tree crops industry of the Papuan economy. The tree crop industry, such as cacao, is seen as a way to increase employment, living standards and prosperity for millions of Papua New Guineans who live in lowland and coastal villages, some far from major population centers.

Manning moved to Rabaul on the island of East New Britain in 1980 to run the community owned New Guinea Islands Produce Company -NGIP, which managed local cocoa plantations. He resided in Rabaul from 1980 until 1993. He met his wife, Relly, a local Tolai woman. Manning was inducted into Tolai society.

The cocoa industry in New Britain was severely hurt by the failure of the initial hybrid crop, which companies like NGIP invested in heavily, and then by the devastating Rabaul volcanic eruption of 1994, which also damaged parts of the town. The eruption led to the restructuring of the cocoa industry and Manning left the company, with later merged with Agmark Pacific.

Manning moved back to Port Moresby, the capital of Papua New Guinea, following the volcanic eruptions. In 1997, Manning became the director of the PNG Institute of National Affairs, the country's leading independent economic agency and think tank. He served as director of the institute for eight years. Manning became a vocal critic of corruption and the decline of good governance within the PNG government, especially in Parliament. He was especially critical of the government of Prime Minister Michael Somare. He also became an ardent supporter of reforms undertaken by Sir Mekere Morauta when he was Prime Minister from 1999 until 2002.

In 2003, Manning authored a study for the Centre for Independent Studies, an Australian think tank. He suggested in the study that the government of Papua New Guinea was in danger of collapse due to corruption and lawlessness, similar to what had occurred in the neighboring Solomon Islands in the early 2000s. Manning's report also stated that PNG had lost control of large parts of its territory. PNG MPs, angered by bad press in the Australian media, called for Manning's deportation, some yelling "Put him (Mr Manning) on the plane tomorrow" during a parliamentary session. PNG Prime Minister Michael Somare called for Manning to pack up and leave the country.

Manning was referred to the PNG privileges committee for contempt by Prime Minister Michael Somare and Speaker Bill Skate as a prelude to Manning's deportation. Manning's referral was supported by a number of other Ministers and MPs, including Fisheries Minister Andrew Baing.

The referral led to a kangaroo court meant to silence Manning's criticism of the government. However, the referral failed when MPs were reminded that Manning, who had renounced his Australian citizenship, was a full PNG citizen, had married a PNG Tolai woman, had been inducted into Tolai society, and had raised three children in Papua New Guinea.

=== Transparency International PNG ===
Manning's reputation as a well-respected anti-corruption campaigner led to his seat on the Transparency International PNG board of directors beginning in 1999. He was elected the Chairman of Transparency International PNG (TIPNG) in 2003 following the death of the organization's first chairman, Sir Anthony Siaguru.

Manning was a prominent critic of the improper use of public funds and government corruption. He advocated for the creation and improvement of a network of organizations within Papua New Guinea to fight corruption. Manning also served on the global accreditation board of Transparency International and was re-elected to that position at TI's 2007 meeting in Bali.

He once again came under fire from Prime Minister Michael Somare in December 2007 when he stated in a TIPNG anti-corruption seminar that two-thirds of PNG's total annual revenue, equal to 2.5 billion PGK a year, was being stolen by corrupt politicians and government bureaucrats. Somare, who viewed Manning's statements as an attack on MPs, blasted him saying "Mr. Manning’s latest outburst in the media direct attack on the intelligence and commonsense of the people of Papua New Guinea who have mandated us to represent them in Parliament." Somare called on TIPNG and Manning to stop "hasty generalizations" and "stop playing power games under the guise of transparency."

Manning was elected a full member of Transparency International's global governing board of directors on 19 August 2008, just three days before his death.

=== Semi-retirement ===
Manning partially retired in 2006, but remained active with Transparency International and other organizations. Manning became chairman of Peace Foundation Melanesia, which works for local community conflict resolution within Melanesia. He also championed the recreation of the PNG Growers' Association, an agricultural pressure group.

He and his wife built a house in East New Britain in 2006.

== Death ==
Manning died of a sudden heart attack while walking near his home in Rabaul, East New Britain, on 22 August 2008. He was 65 years old. He was survived by his second wife, Relly Manning, and their children, David, who became PNG's Commissioner of Police, Alan, and Belinda. He was also survived by his children from his first marriage in Australia - James, Kate, Samuel - and his grandchildren. His brothers, Chris and Ned, also survived him.

Manning's funeral, which was attended by hundreds of people, was held at an outdoor church in Port Moresby. Prominent dignitaries who attended included Governor General Paulias Matane, the Australian High Commissioner to PNG Chris Moraitis and the deputy leader of the opposition, Bart Philemon. Manning was buried in his wife's, Relly Manning, home village of Baai, which is located on New Britain near Rabaul.

Prime Minister of Papua New Guinea Michael Somare, who often clashed with Manning, said that "PNG has lost a son" who was "passionate about PNG" in a written statement. Somare further wrote that "While I have not always agreed with his views on issues, I respect his courage to speak his mind without fear or favour."

Transparency International PNG announced that Peter Aitsi had been chosen as Manning's interim successor as chairman on 9 September 2008.
