= Henry Manning (spy) =

17th-century English spy

Henry Manning was a spy in the exiled court of Charles II at Cologne and Brussels. He reported back to John Thurloe, Cromwell's chief of counter-espionage. He was unmasked as a mole in 1655, prosecuted and executed by firing squad.
