= D. J. Manning =

British academic and author (1938–2014)

David John Manning (8 April 1938 – 10 April 2014) was a British academic and author who was a lecturer in politics at Durham University.

He was a student of Michael Oakeshott. Manning's critique of Jeremy Bentham's philosophy, The Mind of Jeremy Bentham, was influenced by Oakeshott's ideas.

Manning hosted MA politics seminars at Durham University and he edited a collection of essays by his former students, which were published in 1980 as The Form of Ideology: Investigations Into the Sense of Ideological Reasoning with a View to Giving an Account of Its Place in Political Life.

Manning is the father of French filmmaker and radio personality Harold Manning (see page). He died on 10 April 2014, at the age of 76.

== Works ==
- 'Professor Michael Oakeshott's contribution to political thought', Clare Market (Lent 1965), pp. 27-34.
- The Mind of Jeremy Bentham (London: Longmans, 1968).
- Liberalism (London: Littlehampton Book Services, 1976).
- (editor), The Form of Ideology: Investigations Into the Sense of Ideological Reasoning with a View to Giving an Account of Its Place in Political Life (London: George Allen & Unwin, 1980).
- (co-authored with T. J. Robinson), The Place of Ideology in Political Life (London: Croom Helm, 1985).
- (co-authored with Y. M. Carlisle), 'The Concept of Ideology and Work Motivation', Organization Studies, Vol. 15, No. 5 (1994), pp. 683–703.
- (co-authored with Y. M. Carlisle), 'The Ideologics of Modern Politics', Political Studies, Vol. 43, No. 3 (1995), pp. 482–496.
- (co-authored with Y. M. Carlisle), 'The Ideology of Technology and the Birth of the Global Economy', Technology in Society, Volume 18, Issue 1 (1996), pp. 61-77.
- (co-authored with Y. M. Carlisle), 'The Domain of Professional Business Ethics', Organization, Vol. 3, No. 3 (1996), pp. 341–360.
- 'The Philosophical Foundations of Liberal Ideology', Journal of Political Ideologies, Vol. 2, No. 2 (1997), pp. 137-158.
- (co-authored with Y. M. Carlisle), 'Ideological Persuasion and Technological Determinism', Technology in Society, Vol. 21, No. 1 (1999), pp. 81–102.
- (co-authored with Y. M. Carlisle), 'Industrial Organization and the Technological Time Trap', Organization, Vol. 7, No. 1 (2000), pp. 155–163.
