= Woodmansterne =

Village in Surrey, England

Coordinates: 51.3241°N 0.1758°W

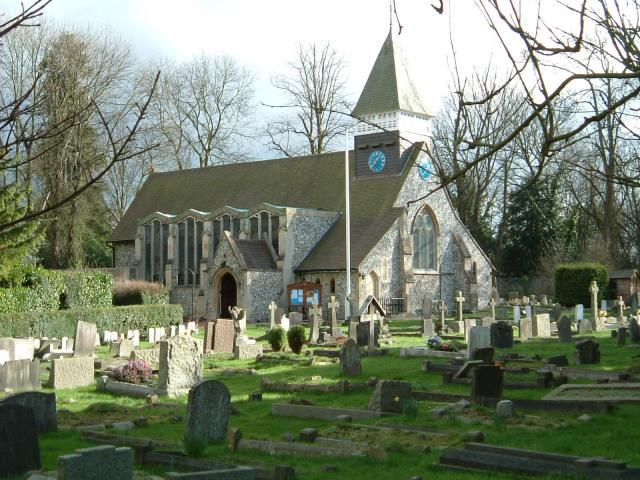
- St Peter's Church (Church of England)

- Location within Surrey
- Population: 2,979 – 2011 Census
- OS grid reference: TQ272599
- District: Reigate and Banstead
- Shire county: Surrey
- Region: South East
- Country: England
- Sovereign state: United Kingdom
- Post town: BANSTEAD
- Postcode district: SM7
- Post town: COULSDON
- Postcode district: CR5
- Dialling code: 020
- Police: Surrey
- Fire: Surrey
- Ambulance: South East Coast
- UK Parliament: Reigate

Woodmansterne is a village in the borough of Reigate and Banstead, Surrey, bordering Greater London, England. It sits on a small plateau of and a southern down slope of the North Downs and its ecclesiastical parish borders continue to span old boundaries and reach into Chipstead, Coulsdon and Wallington.

== History ==
The village lay within the Anglo-Saxon hundred of Wallington which served for strategic meetings of elders and manor owners in the various kingdoms, including in the two centuries before the Norman Conquest, the Kingdom of England.

Woodmansterne appears in Domesday Book of 1086 as Odemerestor, derived from Old English "Ode" = (W)ode = Wood, "mere" = pond, and "tor" = high ground. It was held by Richard de Tonebrige. Its Domesday assets were: 15 hides; 1 church, 1 mill worth 20s, 5 ploughs, 4 acres (1.6 ha) of meadow, wood worth 10 hogs. It rendered £8 per year to its overlords.

The traditional parish borders are very long and narrow and reach into Chipstead, Coulsdon and Wallington, based on the borders of Greater London as they have stood since 1965 and the loose and informal widening of Chipstead that has occurred since its railway station and approximately 400m on all sides is within these boundaries.

In 1951 the civil parish had a population of 3818. On 1 April 1974 the parish was abolished.

== Landmarks ==
=== St Peter's Church ===
The parish church is a Victorian replacement of an older building and due to its late Victorian date and not being by an architect of national renown (as at 2013) it is not listed. It was built in 1877 having been built to a tall and steeply hipped-gable roof design by Mr J. Clarke.

=== Weston Acres ===
This westerly home within a smallholding is listed including its garden terrace wall, in the initial class (of Grade II). Built as a large house it later became accommodation for Seafarers UK (at the time: the Seafarer's Society). Mostly built in 1906, the north entrance front was added in 1915, designed by architect Sydney Tatchell. The design was exhibited at the Royal Academy exhibition in 1916 and was published in several building magazines of the period.

== Geography ==
A residential linear settlement on two main roads, with a few side estates, Woodmansterne is green-buffered in every direction bar two compass points by woods, allotments, and two small farms. The two contiguous settlements it adjoins are in the south, Chipstead, and in the east, a suburban part of the town of Coulsdon. The buffer zones are Metropolitan Green Belt. The area of the primary school, recreation ground and Carshalton Road is on a significant-to-the village northern plateau at 140m above sea level and the remainder of the village is a long, gentle down slope to the south, which contains a majority of the homes. This slope is a middle part of the Chipstead Bottom Valley which descends to only 85m Above Ordnance Datum (Note: This low point is by Chipstead station on the southern border of the village) draining as a dry valley to the north-east. The large gentle slope is half of the major crevice into the widest part of the North Downs which the north of the borough spans. Geologically revealing the sea creatures hidden in the chalk and limestone range, 5 miles (8.0 km) south is the 8 km-long, narrow due-south slope of the North Downs by the M25 motorway, at Betchworth Quarries and Box Hill scaling 80m to 120m from top to bottom, in less than 250m.

== Demography ==
The United Kingdom Census 2011 recorded three settlements as a ward, as Woodmansterne is not large enough in population to merit a ward of its own. As the parish has no equivalent civil parish for extra tiers of local government, being part of an unparished district for those purposes save for Salfords and Sidlow, its population can be produced from the related combined boundaries of output areas Reigate and Banstead 004A and 004B, as an approximation. This altogether had a population of 2,979, living in 1,117 households.

== Local government ==
The ward returning three councillors to the borough council is named after the three villages it covers: Chipstead, Hooley and Woodmansterne.

At the Surrey County Council authority, which is responsible for roads, subsidised public transport, surface water drainage of public roads, most social care and services not to the elderly, libraries, subsidised adult education, overall waste disposal and minerals extraction, state colleges and certain, one councillor is returned per electoral area, here serving the division Banstead, Woodmansterne and Chipstead.

== Transport ==
=== Road ===
Just beyond Woodmansterne upper part border to the north, in the Oaks area of the Wallington is on the A2022, a chord-like route within the M25 from Epsom to the London Boroughs of Croydon and Bromley. The centre of the village is on the B278, (from Morden via Carshalton to Chipstead Bottom). A local easterly route, Woodmansterne Lane, connects the middle of the above main, long, north–south route through the village to Banstead, adjoining to the west.

=== Rail ===
Woodmansterne railway station is on Chipstead Valley Road, less than 200m beyond the border of the London Borough of Croydon and is in the Oyster Zone system. The station is on the Tattenham Corner Line which travels between London Bridge railway station and Tattenham Corner railway station. A local unlit footpath links the village to the station via The Mount on Clockhouse over a field from Manor Hill/Rectory Lane. Along this footpath the radio and TV transmitters at Reigate and Colley Hill are visible.

=== Bus ===
Transport for London bus route 166, from West Croydon to Banstead (and hourly journeys extended to Epsom) threads through Woodmansterne via a circuitous but partly long-established route. Approaching from Coulsdon along Chipstead Valley Road, it eschews the most direct approach along Rectory Lane, and continues along the valley to turn later into Chipstead Road, thus serving a more populous area. Two steep climbs either side of a descent bring the bus to the centre of Woodmansterne village. Here again, the bus adopts a long detour of more recent origin, this time to the north, via the thinly populated Carshalton Road, Croydon Lane and Sutton Lane, to reach Banstead village, in preference to the more direct route via Woodmansterne Lane. It was diverted from the direct route in 2003, when the service frequency was increased to three per hour, owing to the narrowness of Woodmansterne Lane, after a short period when only the hourly service extended to Epsom continued to operate via Woodmansterne Lane. The 166 follows a route (with the exception of the detour to the north) which was formerly operated by Epsom Buses as route 598, and before that by Banstead Coaches as a shuttle between the Mid-day Sun public house in Chipstead (connecting with the 166, which at that time terminated there) and Banstead village.
