= Coulsdon Town railway station =

National Rail station in London, England

Coulsdon Town
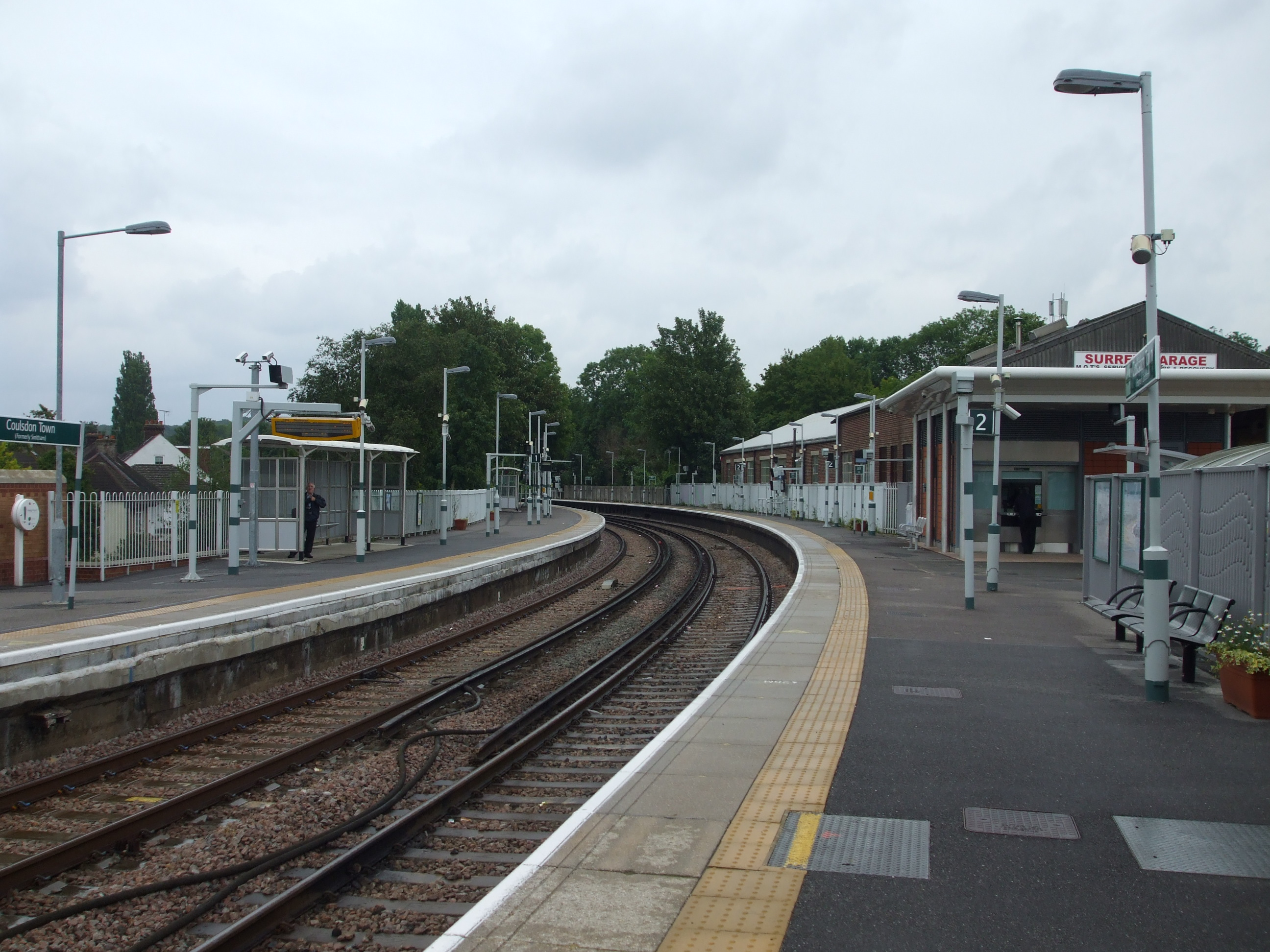
- Interactive map of Coulsdon Town

General information
- Location: Coulsdon
- Local authority: London Borough of Croydon
- Managed by: Southern
- Station code: CDN
- DfT category: E
- Number of platforms: 2
- Fare zone: 6

National Rail annual entry and exit
- 2020–21: ▼57,768
- 2021–22: ▲85,876
- 2022–23: ▲99,896
- 2023–24: ▼93,482
- 2024–25: ▲97,562

Railway companies
- Original company: South Eastern Railway
- Pre-grouping: South Eastern and Chatham Railway
- Post-grouping: Southern Railway

Key dates
- 1 January 1904: Opened as Smitham
- 1 January 1917: Temporarily closed
- 1 January 1919: Reopened
- 22 May 2011: Renamed Coulsdon Town

Other information
- External links: Departures; Facilities
- Coordinates: 51.3219°N 0.134°W

Coulsdon Town railway station serves the northern part of Coulsdon, in the London Borough of Croydon. It is on the Tattenham Corner line 16 miles 46 chains (26.7 km) from Charing Cross and opened on 1 January 1904. Until 22 May 2011 it was called Smitham.

== History ==
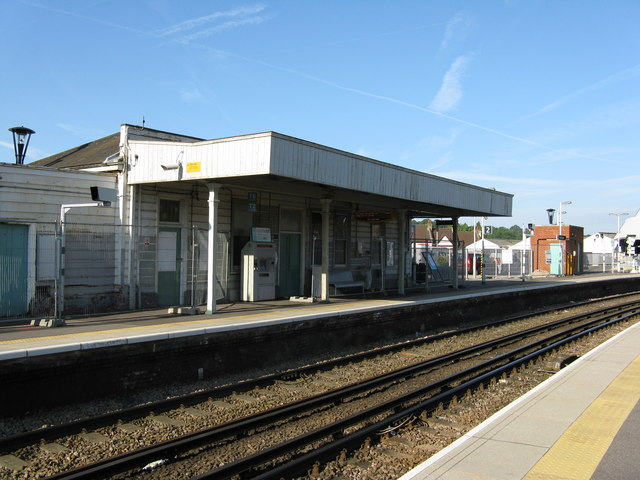
The station building in 2008, before reconstruction and renaming.

The station was opened as Smitham on 1 January 1904 and was briefly closed between 1 January 1917 and 1 January 1919 during the First World War. It lies on a sharp curve, where the line swings away westwards from the Brighton Main Line. It is immediately adjacent to the closed Coulsdon North station on the main line, whose passenger traffic was diverted here when the latter closed on 3 October 1983. Some Tattenham Corner line trains terminated at Smitham before returning to London. Still, nowadays the usual off-peak service is two trains per hour in each direction between London Bridge and Tattenham Corner. An hourly shuttle service used to operate during weekday off-peak hours between Purley and Tattenham Corner, but this was withdrawn in February 2015. Services to London Victoria were withdrawn in 2021 due to the pandemic

The Coulsdon relief road, opened on 18 December 2006 as part of the A23, passes underneath the station, requiring some rearrangement and refurbishment of the platform access routes. There is no direct access to the London-bound platform now; access is via the down platform and a new footbridge or lift.

Network Rail constructed a new modular station building on the downside of the line and a standard-pattern accessible footbridge, which opened in 2010.

As part of the retender of Southern's franchise in 2009, the Department for Transport requested that, in response to lobbying by Croydon Council, the new company look into a better name for the station, as "Smitham" is no longer used as the name of the local area. Coulsdon Town was chosen after a public vote. The change took place on Sunday, 22 May 2011. Evening services to the station were improved in December 2010.

== Services ==
All services at Coulsdon Town are operated by Southern using Class 377 EMUs.

The typical off-peak service in trains per hour is:

- 2 tph to London Bridge (non-stop from Norwood Junction)
- 2 tph to Tattenham Corner

On Sundays, the service is reduced to hourly and runs between Tattenham Corner and Purley only. Passengers for London Bridge have to change at Purley.

Preceding station	National Rail	Following station
Reedham	Southern Tattenham Corner Line	Woodmansterne

It was initially proposed that from 2018, when the Thameslink Programme was due to be completed, services on this line would be operated with larger 12 car trains offering all day direct services to Cambridge via London Blackfriars. However, in September 2016, these proposals were dropped; instead, services on the Tattenham Corner line are to "remain as Southern South London Metro services with increased capacity as compared to today".
