= Woodmansterne railway station =

National Rail station in London, England

Woodmansterne
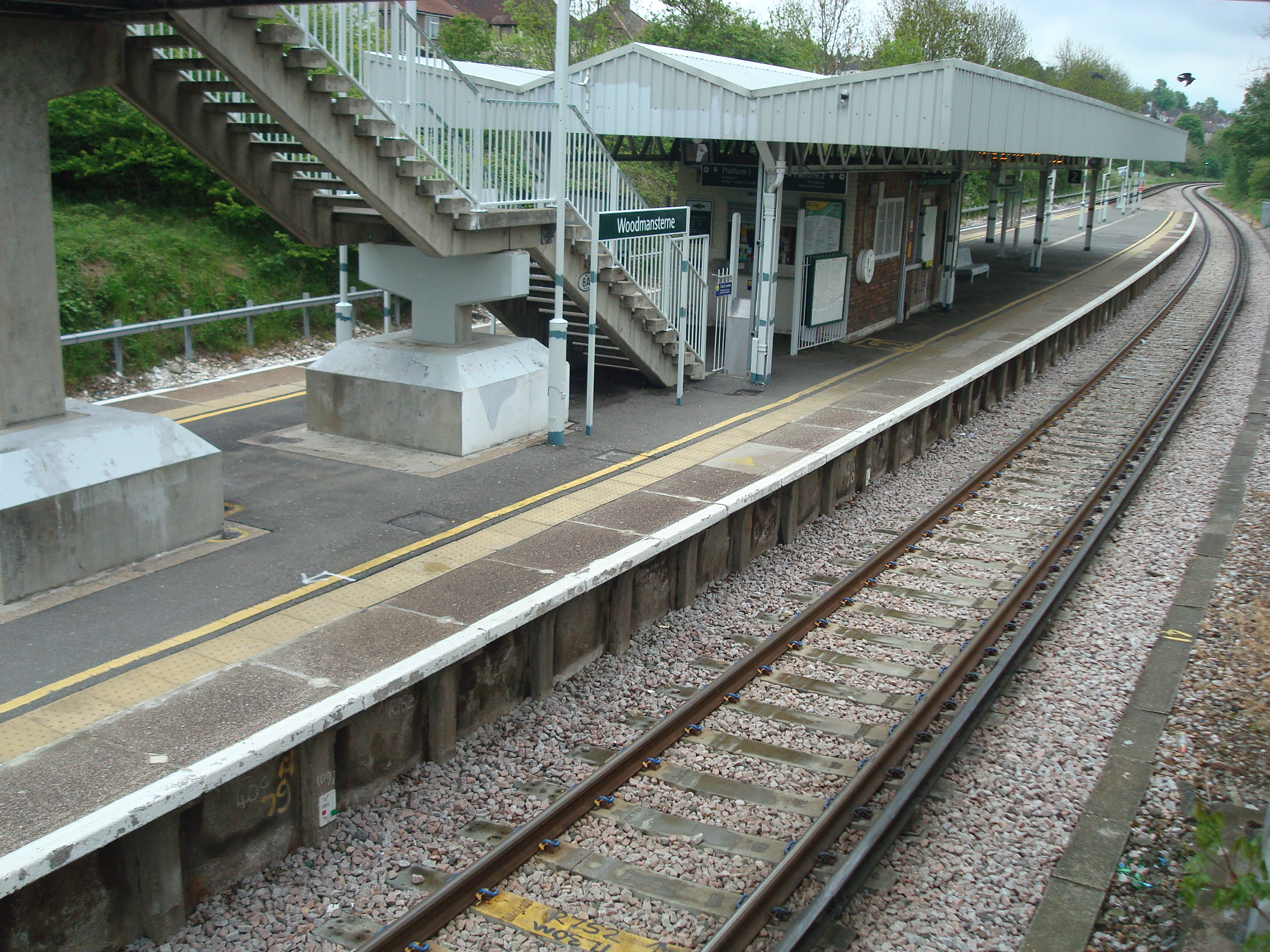
- Interactive map of Woodmansterne

General information
- Location: Coulsdon
- Local authority: London Borough of Croydon
- Managed by: Southern
- Station code: WME
- DfT category: E
- Number of platforms: 2
- Fare zone: 6

National Rail annual entry and exit
- 2020–21: ▼37,704
- 2021–22: ▲88,790
- 2022–23: ▲0.115 million
- 2023–24: ▼0.114 million
- 2024–25: ▲0.127 million

Railway companies
- Original company: Southern Railway

Key dates
- 17 July 1932: Opened

Other information
- External links: Departures; Facilities
- Coordinates: 51.3192°N 0.1539°W

Woodmansterne railway station is a railway station which primarily serves the western areas of Coulsdon in the London Borough of Croydon, England. Situated on the Tattenham Corner line, it is 17 miles 40 chains (28.2 km) from London Charing Cross. For ticketing purposes the station is in London fare zone 6. The station has a single island platform, which can be reached by a footbridge, and there is a ticket office on the platform.

All trains serving Woodmansterne are operated by Southern, which also manages the station.

Despite its name, the station is not located in Woodmansterne itself, which actually lies just under 2 miles (3.2 km) northwest of the station and is on the other side of the Greater London boundary in Surrey.

== Services ==
All services at Woodmansterne are operated by Southern using Class 377 EMUs.

The typical off-peak service in trains per hour is:

- 2 tph to London Bridge (non-stop from Norwood Junction)
- 2 tph to Tattenham Corner

On Sundays, the service is reduced to hourly and runs between Tattenham Corner and Purley only. Passengers for London Bridge have to change at Purley.

It was initially proposed that from 2018, when the Thameslink Programme was due to be completed, services on this line would be operated with longer, 12-car trains offering all-day direct services to/from Cambridge via London Blackfriars. However, in September 2016, these proposals were dropped; instead, services on the Tattenham Corner line are to "remain as Southern South London Metro services with increased capacity as compared to today".

== Connections ==
London Buses route 166 and non-TfL route 866 serve the station on Chipstead Valley Road to the south. A hail-and-ride section of London Buses route 463 runs along St Andrew's Road to the north of the station.

Preceding station	National Rail	Following station
Coulsdon Town	Southern Tattenham Corner Line	Chipstead
