= Bonsor =

Bonsor may refer to:

- Alexander Bonsor (1851–1907), English footballer
- Brian Bonsor (1926–2011), Scottish musician, composer and teacher
- Sir Cosmo Bonsor (1848–1929), English brewer, businessman and politician
- Fred Bonsor (1862–1932), English rugby union player
- Sir Nicholas Bonsor (1942–2023), English politician

== See also ==
- Bonsor baronets
- Bonser
