= Cosmo Bonsor =

English brewer and politician (1848–1929)

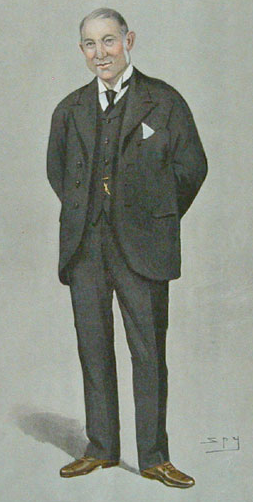

House of Commons
- In office 1885–1900

Chairman of the South Eastern Railway
- In office 1897–1928

Personal details
- Born: 2 September 1848 Polesden Lacey, England
- Died: 4 December 1929 (aged 81) Nice, France
- Party: Conservative
- Spouses: Emily Gertrude Fellowes (m. 1872; died 1882) Mabel Grace Brand (m. 1886)
- Education: Eton College
- Occupation: Brewer, businessman, politician

Sir Henry Cosmo Orme Bonsor, 1st Baronet, DL (2 September 1848 – 4 December 1929) was an English brewer and businessman and a Conservative politician who sat in the House of Commons from 1885 to 1900.

== Biography ==
Bonsor was born in Polesden Lacey on 2 September 1848, the son of Joseph Bonsor. He was educated at Eton and with his father and brother became a partner in the brewing firm of Combe & Co. He was a director of the Bank of England, and a Governor of Guy's Hospital.

Bonsor married Emily Gertrude Fellowes in 1872. She died in London on 18 July 1882, and he remarried to Mabel Grace Brand on 3 March 1886.

In 1885 Bonsor was elected M.P. for Wimbledon and held the seat until 1900. Also in 1885, Bonsor purchased the estate of Kingswood Warren, Surrey from Sir John Cradock Hartopp and lived there until 1906 when he put it on the market because of the rising cost of maintenance.

In 1898 Bonsor organised the brewery amalgamation to form Watney Combe & Reid, of which he remained chairman until 1928.

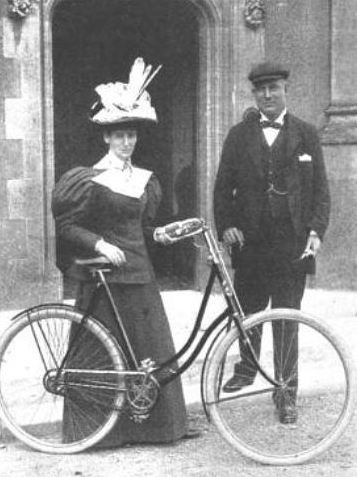
Mabel and Cosmo Bonsor in 1898

Bonsor was created a baronet on 26 January 1925. He died four years later at the age of 81 in Nice. He was buried in St Andrew's churchyard. Bonsor was a public benefactor and was loved locally for his kindness and generosity to all. His son Reginald succeeded to the baronetcy.

== Railway service ==
In 1895 Bonsor was appointed deputy-chairman of the South Eastern Railway (SER), and was elected chairman of that railway following the death of the incumbent, Sir George Russell, Bart, on 7 March 1898. At the start of 1899 the SER entered into a working union with its neighbour and hitherto competitor, the London, Chatham and Dover Railway (LCDR). Each of the two railways provided four members of the new South Eastern & Chatham Railway Companies Joint Management Committee, and Bonsor was elected Chairman of that body, retaining his SER post. He retired from railway service upon the formation (by amalgamation of the SER, LCDR and other railways) of the Southern Railway at the start of 1923.

In 1899 he formed a private syndicate to extend the Tattenham Corner Line from Kingswood railway station to Tattenham Corner railway station to take the racegoing traffic to Epsom Downs Racecourse. A train named in his honour formerly ran as part of the Southern services to London Bridge. The train stock was of Class 456.

Parliament of the United Kingdom
New constituency	Member of Parliament for Wimbledon; 1885–1900	Succeeded by Charles Eric Hambro
Baronetage of the United Kingdom
New creation	Baronet (of Kingswood); 1925–1929	Succeeded by Reginald Bonsor
