= Reedham railway station =

Reedham railway station may refer to two stations in England:

- Reedham railway station (London), in Purley
- Reedham railway station (Norfolk)
