= Reedham =

Reedham may refer to:

- Reedham, Norfolk, a village in Norfolk
  - Reedham railway station (Norfolk) in Reedham, Norfolk
- Reedham, London, a locality or neighbourhood of Purley, London
  - Reedham railway station (London) in Purley, London
