= Chipstead railway station =

National Rail station in Surrey, England

Chipstead
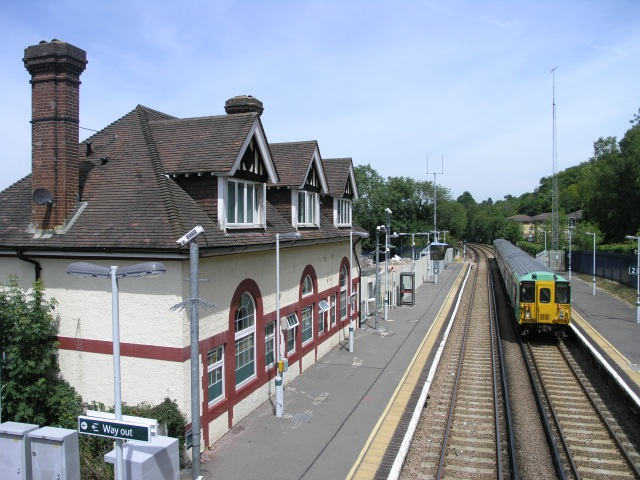
- Interactive map of Chipstead

General information
- Location: Chipstead
- Local authority: Borough of Reigate and Banstead
- Managed by: Southern
- Station code: CHP
- DfT category: E
- Number of platforms: 2
- Fare zone: 6

National Rail annual entry and exit
- 2020–21: ▼22,290
- 2021–22: ▲57,976
- 2022–23: ▲80,850
- 2023–24: ▼78,164
- 2024–25: ▲87,736

Railway companies
- Original company: Chipstead Valley Railway
- Pre-grouping: South Eastern and Chatham Railway
- Post-grouping: Southern Railway

Key dates
- 2 November 1897: Opened

Other information
- External links: Departures; Facilities
- Coordinates: 51.309°N 0.169°W

Chipstead railway station serves the village of Chipstead in Surrey. It is a late-Victorian station on the Tattenham Corner Line and was opened in 1897. The station and all trains serving it are operated by Southern. It is in London fare zone 6, 18 miles 41 chains (29.8 km) from Charing Cross.

The station buildings are no longer used by Southern, having been sold and converted for private use in the 1990s, and a small ticket office is in a pre-fabricated building on the Up platform.

== Services ==
All services at Chipstead are operated by Southern using Class 377 EMUs.

The typical off-peak service in trains per hour is:

- 2 tph to London Bridge (non-stop from Norwood Junction)
- 2 tph to Tattenham Corner

On Sundays, the service is reduced to hourly and runs between Tattenham Corner and Purley only. Passengers for London Bridge have to change at Purley.

Preceding station	National Rail	Following station
Woodmansterne	Southern Tattenham Corner Line	Kingswood
