= Kingswood, Surrey =

Village and parish in England

Coordinates: 51.2931°N 0.2086°W

Kingswood
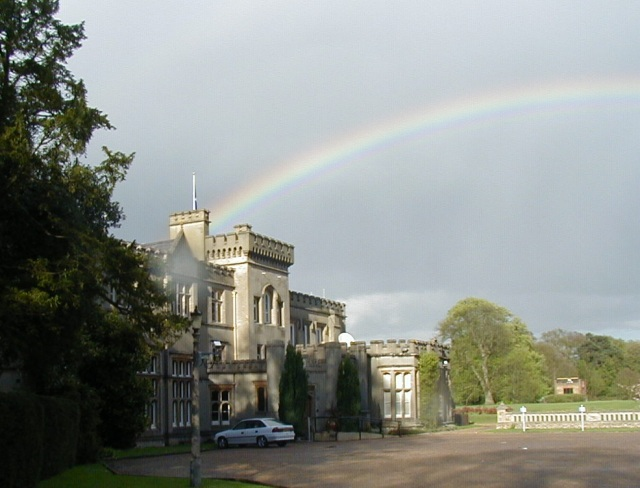
- Kingswood Warren Park; Renovated and subdivided 2012

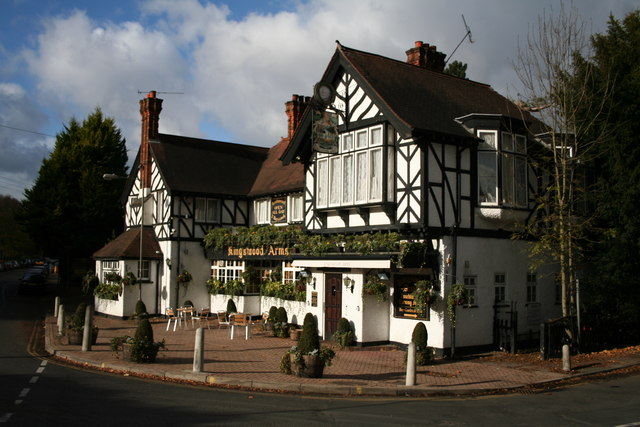
- The Kingswood Arms

- Location within Surrey
- Population: 6,891 (2011 Census) (Note: An increase from 6,219 in 2001.)
- OS grid reference: TQ248559
- District: Reigate and Banstead
- Shire county: Surrey
- Region: South East
- Country: England
- Sovereign state: United Kingdom
- Post town: Tadworth
- Postcode district: KT20
- Dialling code: 01737
- Police: Surrey
- Fire: Surrey
- Ambulance: South East Coast
- UK Parliament: Reigate

Kingswood or Kingswood with Burgh Heath is a residential area on the North Downs in the borough of Reigate and Banstead in Surrey, England. Part of the London commuter belt, Kingswood is just to the east of the A217 separating it from Tadworth and has a railway station. Burgh Heath in its north is combined with it to form a ward. Reigate is 3.6 miles (5.8 km) south of its centre and London is 15.5 miles (24.9 km) to the north northeast. Kingswood with Burgh Heath had a population of 6,891 in 2011.

== History ==
=== Middle Ages ===
The first specific reference to the land which later charters, parish, hundred and county maps state to be Kingswood is in the Domesday Book, where a passage in the entry for Ewell states that "2 hides and 1 virgate were removed from this manor; they were there before 1066, but reeves lent them to their friends; and 1 woodland pasture and 1 croft" – Ewell's Lords of the manor in 1086 were Osbern of Eu (held of King William) and King William himself.

Henry II granted it with Shelwood much further detached, in the Weald, as parcel of the manor of Ewell to Merton Priory, who in 1291 were given licence to inclose the wood of Kingswood as "it was their own soil and without the bounds of the royal hunting forest" – see Windsor Great Park.

From Domesday Kingswood, including Lower Kingswood and much of Burgh Heath was a detached part of the parish of Ewell. Between it the Banstead commons of Banstead including what is now Tadworth stretched to Reigate forming a buffer particularly for the parish of Walton-on-the-Hill. The wider Copthorne Hundred was a royal hundred. Kingswood by being a liberty was excluded. That hundred around on all sides but the south was worth almost £48 in the 14th century and £136 16s. 4d. in 1636. (Note: This valuation was when the hundred was assessed for Ship money in 1636 – Copthorne Hundred's history – H. E. Malden, 1911)

Burgh Heath however was recorded, appearing as Burgh, held in 1086 by Hugh of Port of Bishop Odo of Bayeux, his overlord; its assets were 5 exemption units (large estates) for which it was taxed on 2.5.

==== Early Chapel ====
There was a chapel in the far-removed hamlet of Kingswood which had existed long before the middle of the 15th century; for when the vicarage of Ewell was endowed in 1458, it is mentioned as of long standing. Mention occurs towards the close of the reign of Edward I of England. A church ruling stipulated that the vicar of Ewell should not be obliged to minister to the hamlet of Kingswood or to celebrate Mass in the chapel there; that when any of the Sacraments of the Church were to be administered to the people of that place, the rectors (Prior and convent of Newark) should provide a priest for the purpose; and in case of the death of any inhabitant of Kingswood and his removal to Ewell for burial, the vicar should meet the body at Provost's Cross, on the south side of Ewell, which had been the custom from ancient time. The subsequent history of this chapel is obscure.

=== Post Reformation ===
==== Kingswood Manor ====
Nonetheless, on the dissolution of the monasteries (1536–8) King Henry VIII seized Kingswood Manor that comprised almost all the land of Kingswood, earlier valued at £14 6s. 8d in 1535, annexing it to the honour of Hampton Court (its purview).

Queen Elizabeth I bestowed it to the first Lord Howard of Effingham for annual service of 1/40 of a knight's fee, kept until sold by his grandson who was also Earl of Nottingham. As granted to a cavalier by a loyal brother who served Cromwell, a roundhead, the Manorial roll has no mention of Sir John Heydon holding court at the manor; it passed to a relative of Howard's wife Charles Cockayne, another royalist who on in 1656 conveyed it to Thomas Bludworth. Bludworth of Flanchford, Reigate held it on the Restoration until October 1660, holding court for years until 1698, when his son took over, then sold it in 1703 to Lynch and Brandon as trustees for Thomas Harris, who held a court in 1708. Kingswood Manor then descended to his son Thomas, whose nephew John Hughes in 1791 sold the manor to William Jolliffe, whose son Hylton Jolliffe was owning it in 1804, selling it in about 1830 to Thomas Alcock, from whose executors it was bought by Sir John Hartopp, and from his trustees by H. Cosmo Bonsor.

==== Other occurrences at this time ====
In this era today's Brighton Road through Croydon and Redhill, the A23 replaced the Old Brighton road which came up Reigate Hill, passed through Lower Kingswood and by Upper Kingswood and on into Sutton, which is now the A217, preventing development of the area.

In 1632 and from 1669 to 1812 St Mary the Virgin Church, Ewell maintained separate Kingswood books with all the conformist births, deaths and marriages of Kingswood.

=== Post Industrial Revolution ===
Kingswood was until the early 20th century the administrative unit of Kingswood Liberty see Liberty (division), of 1,821 acres (737 ha), a completely detached part of Ewell parish, bounded on the west and north by Banstead, on the east by Chipstead and Gatton, on the south by Reigate.

Based on the 1841 census, Samuel Lewis writes of Kingswood in 1848 there were 848 inhabitants and, in brief, consisted of 1,800 acres (730 ha) of which 400 were woodland and the remainder almost wholly arable. Kingswood Warren (house) was built about 1850, see Landmarks.

In 1838 an ecclesiastical district was formed from a new church costing over £1100 consecrated 14 January 1836 from Kingswood with a portion of Banstead, and a newer church, St. Andrew's, was built in 1848 by Thomas Alcock. Malden states in 1911 that the old church in 1911 was used as a parish room and the church was still endowed with a glebe of 31 acres. Kingswood Methodist chapel was built by the late H. Fowker however has been converted.

Kingswood became in 1899 the terminus of a branch of the South Eastern and Chatham Railway, now the Tattenham Corner branch. Writing in 1911, Malden states: the neighbourhood which used to be singularly sequestered and rural is fast becoming residential, especially since the opening of the railway. But the majority of the new houses are in the part of Banstead included in the ecclesiastical parish of Kingswood, not in the old portion of Ewell.

Lower Kingswood School was built in 1893 and enlarged in 1903. Tadworth and Kingswood School (in Banstead parish) was built in 1875. Both are County Council Schools.

Kingswood is today characterised by housing which is described as arcadian, which implies it is 'spacious and tree-dominated'.

Kingswood was formerly a liberty and chapelry, in 1866 Kingswood became a separate civil parish, on 1 April 1974 the parish was abolished. In 1951 the parish had a population of 3606.

== Geography ==
=== Elevation, geology and soil ===
The entire ward sits on top of the North Downs and, taken as a whole, slopes gradually from 200m AOD in the south to 170m AOD in Upper Kingswood in the north. Kingswood is rectangular, less than 3 miles from north to south, and is under a mile broad.

Upper watercourses cut gentle valleys in this ward including between Lower Kingswood and Upper Kingswood where the land dips from 174m AOD in Lower Kingswood to 144 along Chipstead Lane that divides Lower and Upper Kingswood and is closer to Lower Kingswood – three residential streets around Chipstead Lane form Hogden Bottom, Lower Kingswood including Chipstead Lane itself. This ravine is accompanied by another, along which the Kingswood railway runs towards London, further down this joins the Hogden stream at Chipstead Bottom in a short distance at the east edge of the ward: here the elevation is only 111m AOD.

Upper Kingswood is lower than much of Lower Kingswood, however its gradients are less steep than the depths of Hogden Bottom between the two, fractionally closer to the developed southern part of Lower Kingswood and possibly considered part of it therefore. The main street is on average at a modest 166m AOD, with the central, station section at 147-152m AOD. Below to the northeast and northwest are Sutton and Epsom at 30-40m at their centres. The folding landscape around both explains the misnomer among the names.

Its geology is that of the North Downs, see Surrey – Geology; as to soil Chipstead, Banstead and Tadworth have the first free draining slightly acid loamy soil that tops the wider downs to Guildford and is found around Dorking.

== Localities ==
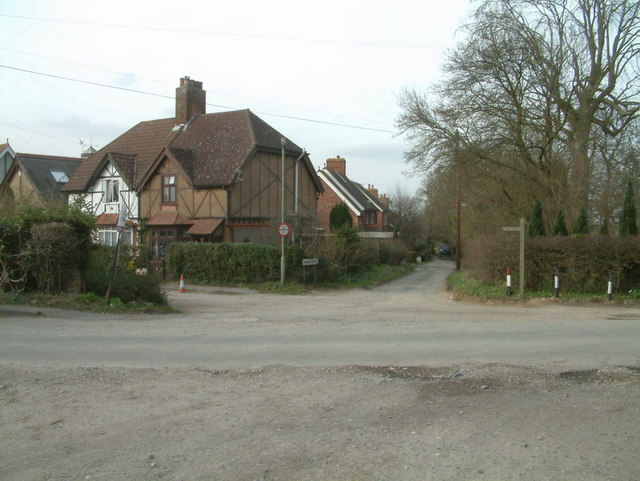
Manor Lane Lower Kingswood

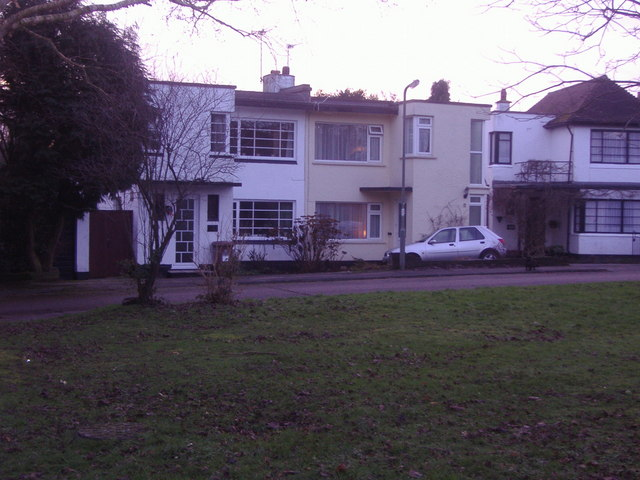
Modernist housing at Burgh Heath – taken at dusk

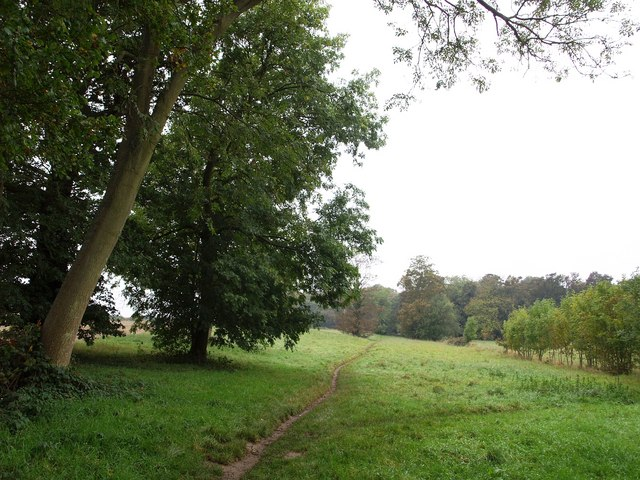
Footpath towards Canons Wood on Burgh Heath

=== Upper Kingswood or Kingswood ===
This area had a population of 2,839 forming 1,055 households at the time of the 2001 Census. A garden residential estate bounded on the west by a narrow woodland green buffer separating the A217, which can only be accessed in both directions at the "Tadworth" roundabout, Kingswood Park, Garden Farm and the International School of Minting occupies the northwest; Kingswood Warren garden estate, the southwest. Reigate is 4 miles (6.4 km) south of its centre and London is 15.5 miles (24.9 km) to the NNE.

Kingswood village centre has several independent shops, a large mock-Tudor public house, the "Kingswood Arms", and Kingswood railway station in the dip of the main street, Waterhouse Lane. To the south side of the shopping parade is part of the undeveloped Green Belt giving views of the open fields of Garden Farm and meadows of Kingswood Park.

=== Lower Kingswood ===
This settlement had a population of 2,099 forming 1,067 households at the time of the 2001 Census - the locality slopes down the A217, accessible to many properties and side-roads. Built-up side roads include: Buckland Road which has Kingswood Primary School; Stubbs Lane (the two meet at a high point of 191m AOD); Babylon Lane (by Kingswood Grange and Kingswood Manor); Smithy Lane and Green Lane. Kingswood recreation ground is here with tennis courts, playground and a pavilion for football pitches, bowls, park and woodland.

=== Burgh Heath ===
Burgh Heath is a residential area (neighbourhood) with remnant part of the Banstead Commons of the same name. Immediately north of Upper Kingswood on the A217 road, it adjoins Banstead. Nork, Banstead is the neighbourhood directly north. The dual carriageway has meant that today there are two separate areas of housing: a larger part with shops on the main road and surrounding Canons Lane to the east and the other to the west close to the ponds, facing Burgh Heath and to distinguish it from the built up section, known to its residents as The Green. Burgh Heath had a population of 2,099 forming 839 households at the time of the 2001 Census.

Burgh Heath has a large supermarket store, a luxury sports car garage and Toyota's UK headquarters are located in the north of the area at Great Burgh. There is a parade of shops along the A217 of small independent retailers and several small restaurants. However, the majority of residents in the area are commuters out of the area.

==== Open areas of Burgh Heath ====
The residential area is bordered to the south by the Burgh Heath itself, one of four parts of Banstead Commons, managed by the Banstead Commons Conservators and its byelaws. It is bordered east and north by farmland leading to Banstead Woods, managed by local authority Reigate and Banstead borough council.

Beside the supermarket is a triangular wood in part of which is Burgh Heath BMX Track.

==== Mugswell ====
On a very sparsely built upon part of the southern part of the same crest of the North Downs, traditionally in Banstead parish also, hence in the Banstead Heath protected area, is a small hamlet named Mugswell. It is separated by a narrow green buffer south of Kingswood and another, ENE of Lower Kingswood.

Transport

A junction of the M25 is close to the village. Railways do not pass by the small settlement: its closest stations are Kingswood and Tadworth, more than a mile away. Low-frequency bus services do serve nearby Lower Kingswood.

== Landmarks ==
=== Kingswood Warren ===
Kingswood Warren is a battlemented gothic mansion to the south of the village, much enlarged in the early nineteenth century by the architect T.R. Knowles for its owner Thomas Alcock M.P. From 1948 until 2010 it was used to house the BBC's Research and Development department. Octagon Developments completed the purchase of Kingswood Warren on 1 March 2010 and it gives its name to the garden estate of south Upper Kingswood.

=== Kingswood Court ===
Kingswood Court is larger than and occupies a larger site than the surrounding houses in Kingswood Warren, except for the building Kingswood Warren mentioned above. Ernest Newton was its architect, in terms of size, its main range consists of 11 bays plus a 3-bay west service wing, symmetrically laid out with five bays as bay windows. Constructed from purplish red bricks laid in flemish bond with red brick dressings, it spans three storeys including a purpose-built servant area attic and is georgian in character. This enjoys preservation and upkeep today as a private care home with landscaped gardens.

=== St Andrew's Church ===
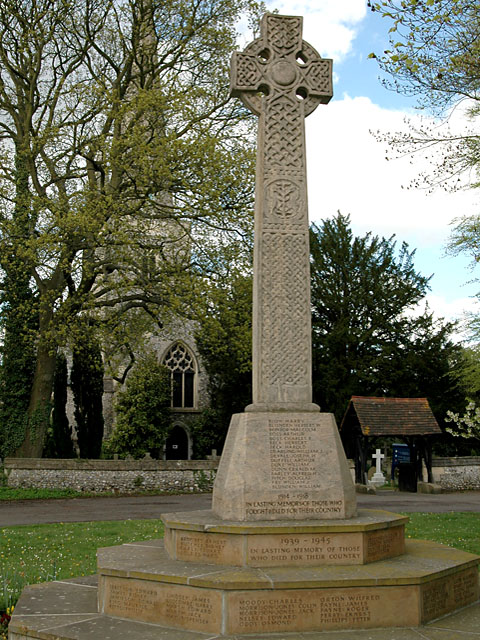
Kingswood war memorial

The original church of St Andrew was built in 1835, in a "Norman" style of architecture, accommodating a congregation of 150. It was consecrated in 1836 and became a parish church in 1838. It soon proved too small for the growing population and in 1848 work began on a larger building on another site. The present St. Andrew's Church was built between 1848 and 1852 at the expense of the then owner of Kingswood Warren, Thomas Alcock. St Andrew's is an exact copy of the 14th century church at Shottesbrooke, Berkshire under the supervision of the architect Benjamin Ferrey. In younger years Thomas Alcock had been a frequent house guest of the Vansittart family at Shottesbrooke Park in Berkshire and worshipped at the church there. The old church served as a parish hall until its demolition in the early twentieth century. Cruciform in shape and splendid with beautiful stained glass windows; its tall distinctive steeple is visible for miles around.

=== St Mary's Church, Burgh Heath ===
This church is further down the London Road, past the Burgh Heath junction with the road to Epsom. The parish of this Church of England church is Howell Hill with Burgh Heath and it was built in 1909, and its area is worked together with Howell Hill in East Ewell.

=== Lower Kingswood Church – The Church of Jesus Christ and the wisdom of God ===
Kingswood's Church of Jesus Christ and the Wisdom of God, an Anglican Church built in the Byzantine style is unique in Europe. It marks the start of Buckland Road and is a Grade I listed building on architecture, it features red brick and stone in various patterns e.g. chequer work, herringbone and basketweave; exotic marble and other stone, nine imported corinthian capitals from Turkey, Arts and Crafts movement lectern, pulpit and reading desk, in ebony and holly with mother of pearl inlay, priests' chairs with domed canopies, Byzantine capitals from Constantinople and Ephesus decorate the aisles and west wall.

The name of the church is reflected in those words from 1 Corinthians carved over the west door.

=== Former Legal & General office and training centre ===
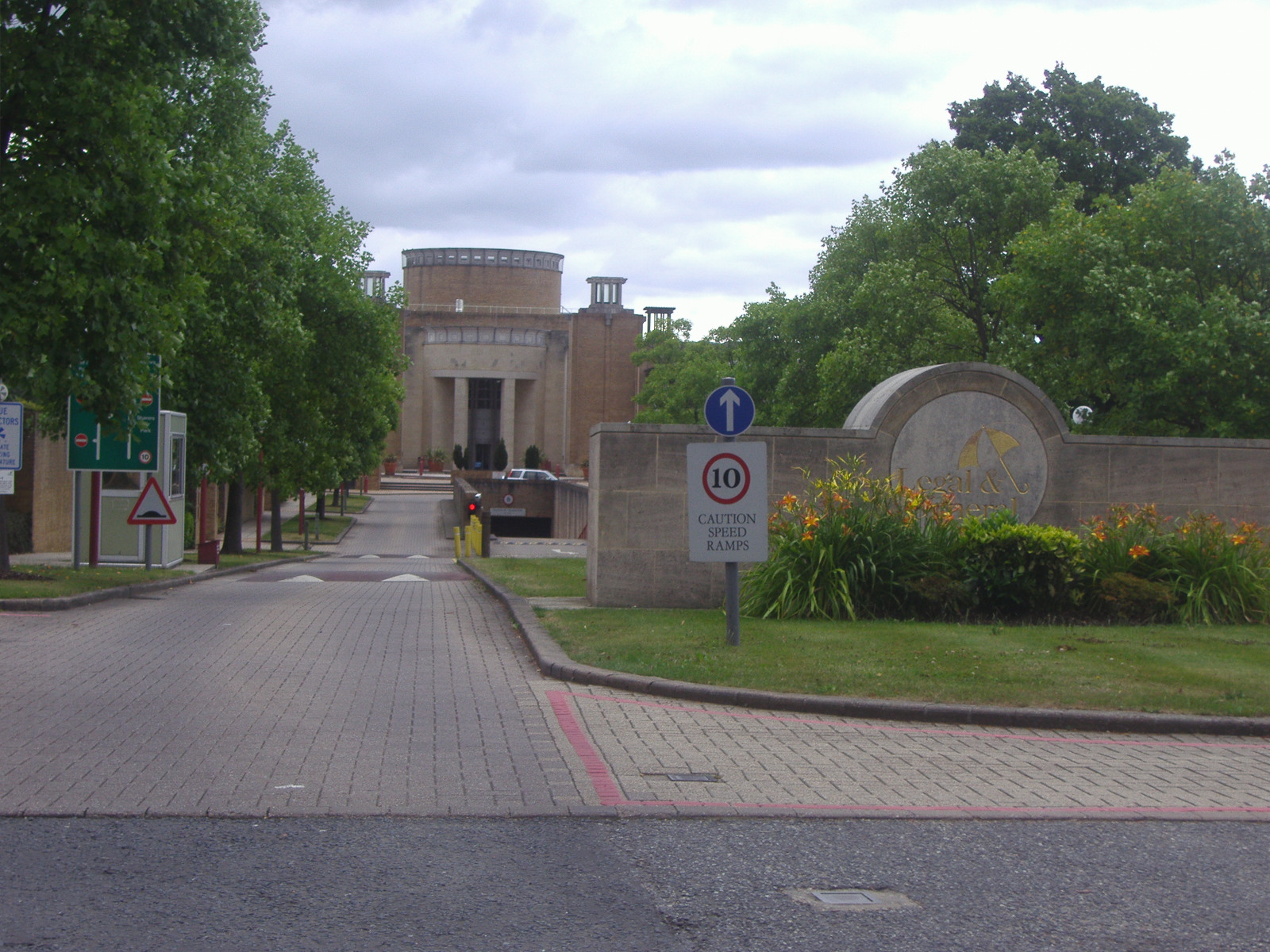
Entrance to Legal and General Insurance, Furze Hill, Kingswood

The financial services company Legal & General had one of its largest offices (not its registered office) at a site on the northern outskirts of Kingswood, until the office was closed in late 2017. Legal & General's former corporate training centre, known as St Monica's, was once a girls' boarding school of the same name. A notable former student was the author Vera Brittain.

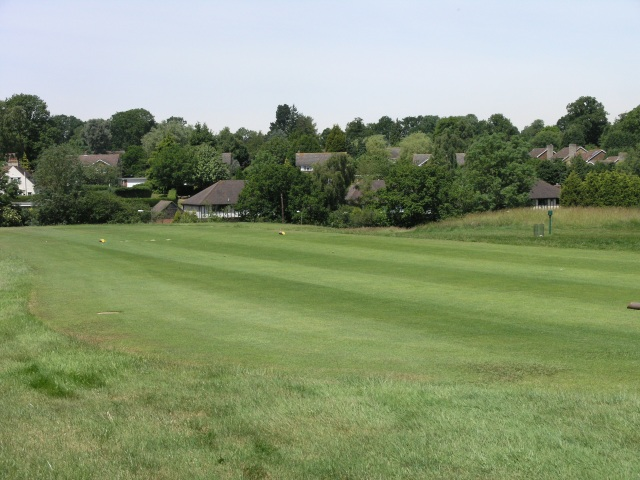
The 3rd Tee, Surrey Downs Golf Club

=== Kingswood Golf and Country Club ===
Kingswood Golf and Country Club occupies the south of the Kingswood Warren with fine views over Smuggler's Pit Plantation, above the small valley, Hogden Bottom. James Braid, five times Open champion, opened in the 1920s this venue as a 6,954 yard course. Today this offers weddings, catering and conferences "the mature course has undergone extensive re-design and construction.".

=== Surrey Downs Golf Club ===
Occupying an adjacent site, in what was Eyhurst Park, on the Chipstead side, is another 18-hole golf club.

== Transport ==
=== Bus ===
No bus services pass through the village. The nearest bus stop is on the A217, on the side of the Tadworth roundabout, for services to Reigate and Redhill; or for services to Epsom and Sutton the stop is across the A217 opposite Tadworth Children's Hospital.

=== Rail ===
Kingswood railway station is on the Tattenham Corner Line, close to the centre of the village. London Bridge is 42 minutes from Kingswood station; East Croydon is 23 minutes

=== Road ===
The A217 is a non-motorway route into London bisecting the ward, combined with the A240 road from Burgh Heath, provides easy journeys within the capital. The M25 London Orbital Motorway's junction 8 is at the south of the ward, accessed by the former straight road. As mentioned the ward is less than 3 miles (4.8 km) in length so 1.5 miles (2.4 km) is the maximum distance away from this route from any given point.

== Education ==
- Kingswood Primary School (ages 2–13), formerly Kingswood and Tadworth County School
- Aberdour School (ages 2–13), independent

=== Nearby schools taking their name from Kingswood ===
- Kingswood House Preparatory School, (ages 2–13), independent

== Famous residents ==
- Maxim Bakiyev, Kyrgyzstani exile, son of former president Kurmanbek Bakiyev, involved with theft of $4.6m of Kyrgyzstan state funds
- Chris Coleman – Wales Football manager
- Danny Murphy – former Fulham Football Club footballer
- Simon Jordan – Former owner of Crystal Palace Football Club
- Vera Brittain – attended St. Monica's School here
- Dennis Barden – Mathematician
- Nicholas Owen – Newsreader (ITN (ITV) and BBC)
- Declan Rice – Football Player
