= Bonser =

Bonser is a surname. Notable people with the surname include:

- Boof Bonser (born 1981), American Baseball pitcher
- David Bonser (1934–2005), Church of England priest, Bishop of Bolton
- Emily Bonser (born 1995), Australian rules footballer
- Georgiana Bonser (1898–1979), British physician
- Horace Bonser (1882–1934), American sport shooter
- John Bonser (steamship captain) (1855–1913), American and Canadian riverboat captain
- Sir John Winfield Bonser (1847–1914), British lawyer and judge, Chief Justice of Ceylon
- Mark Bonser (born 1952), Royal Australian Navy admiral
- Mike Bonser (born 1970), Australian darts player

== See also ==
- Bonsor, surname
