= Tadworth railway station =

Railway station in Surrey, England

Tadworth
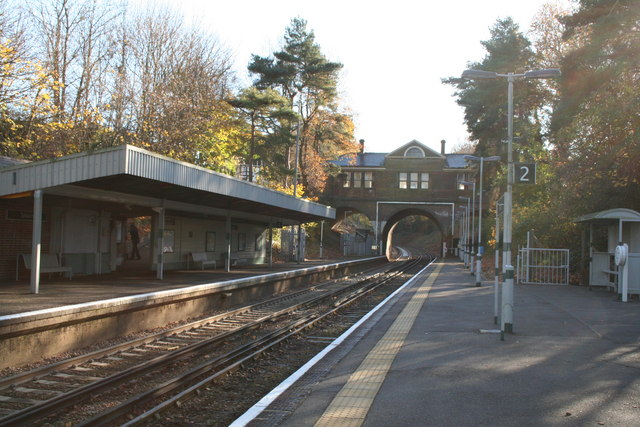
- Interactive map of Tadworth

General information
- Location: Tadworth
- Local authority: Borough of Reigate and Banstead
- Managed by: Southern
- Station code: TAD
- DfT category: E
- Number of platforms: 2
- Fare zone: 6

National Rail annual entry and exit
- 2020–21: ▼57,286
- 2021–22: ▲0.129 million
- 2022–23: ▲0.173 million
- 2023–24: ▲0.189 million
- 2024–25: ▲0.209 million

Railway companies
- Original company: South Eastern Railway
- Pre-grouping: South Eastern and Chatham Railway
- Post-grouping: Southern Railway

Key dates
- 1 July 1900: Opened as Tadworth & Walton-on-the Hill
- 1 December 1968: renamed Tadworth

Other information
- External links: Departures; Facilities
- Coordinates: 51.292°N 0.236°W

Tadworth railway station is a passenger railway station serving the large suburban village of Tadworth in Surrey, England, on the North Downs. It is 22 miles 18 chains (35.8 km) from London Charing Cross.

== Status ==
This is the penultimate station on the Tattenham Corner Line. Train services and the station are operated by Southern. The station opened as a temporary terminus on 1 July 1900, when the railway line was extended from Kingswood. The line was extended to Tattenham Corner, opening on Derby Day on 4 June 1901. The extension required relatively costly cuttings (even with cheap labour). The course taken, brought the railway branch through the centre of Tadworth, before turning sharply north.

Since at least World War II the start point for trains has been from London Bridge station.

== Amenities ==
There are separate platforms for 'down' trains north to Tattenham Corner and 'up' trains to Purley and London, linked by a road overbridge at the south end of the station on which is located the former station building.

== Services ==
All services at Tadworth are operated by Southern using Class 377 EMUs.

The typical off-peak service in trains per hour is:

- 2 tph to London Bridge (non-stop from Norwood Junction)
- 2 tph to Tattenham Corner

On Sundays, the service is reduced to hourly and runs between Tattenham Corner and Purley only. Passengers for London Bridge have to change at Purley.

Preceding station	National Rail	Following station
Kingswood	Southern Tattenham Corner Line	Tattenham Corner

It was initially proposed that from 2018, when the Thameslink Programme was completed, services on this line would be operated with larger 12 car trains offering all day direct services to Cambridge via London Blackfriars. However, by September 2016, these proposals had been dropped; instead, services on the Tattenham Corner Line "remain as Southern South London Metro services with increased capacity as compared to today".

== Ticketing ==
There are self-service ticket machines at the London-bound platform entrance (without rural PERTIS 'Permit to Travel' option). Oyster Card readers are provided on both platforms.
