= Kingswood railway station =

National Rail station in Surrey, England

Kingswood
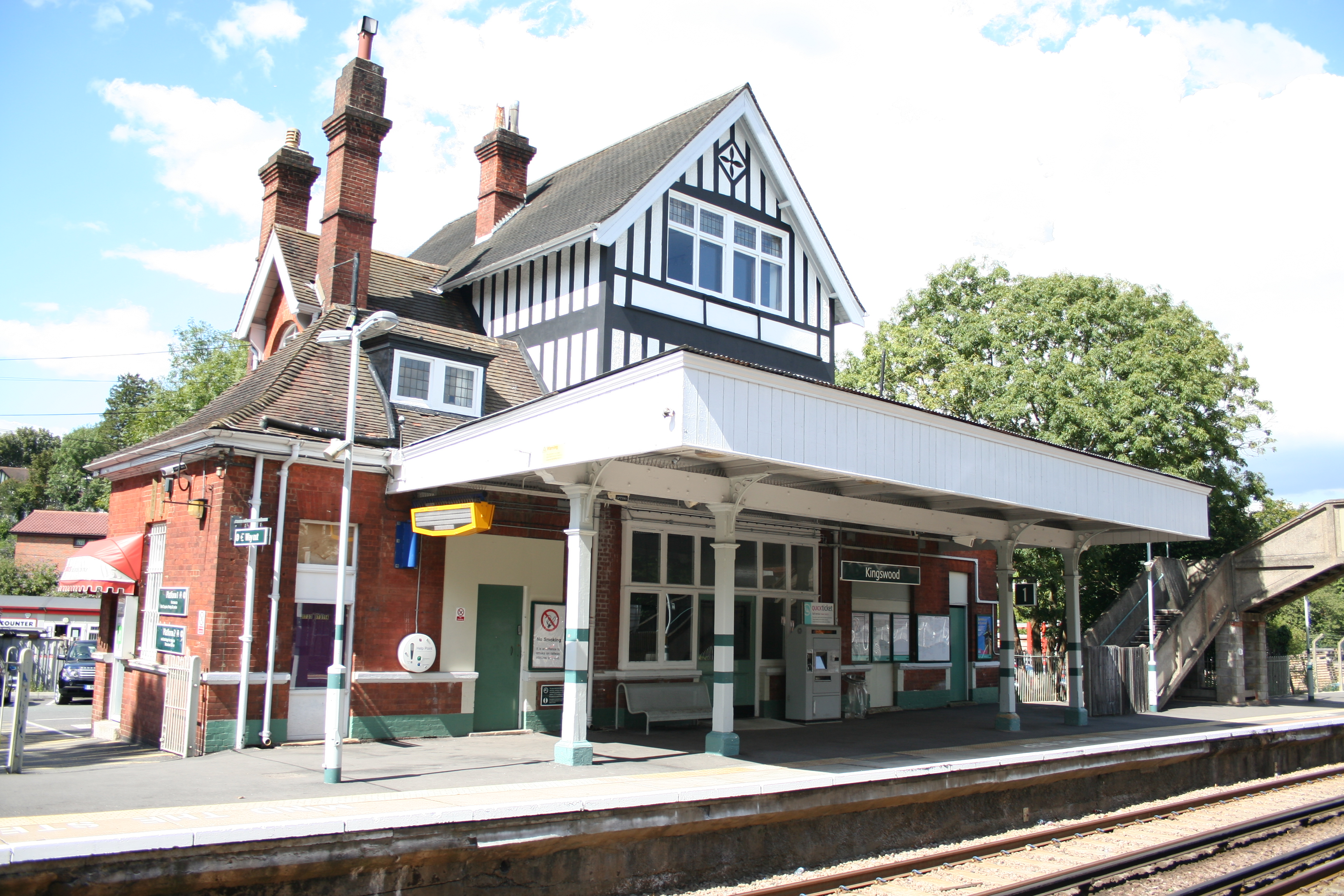
- Interactive map of Kingswood

General information
- Location: Kingswood
- Local authority: Borough of Reigate and Banstead
- Managed by: Southern
- Station code: KND
- DfT category: E
- Number of platforms: 2
- Accessible: Yes
- Fare zone: 6

National Rail annual entry and exit
- 2020–21: ▼39,432
- 2021–22: ▲0.101 million
- 2022–23: ▲0.135 million
- 2023–24: ▼0.131 million
- 2024–25: ▲0.150 million

Key dates
- 2 November 1897: Opened

Other information
- External links: Departures; Facilities
- Coordinates: 51.295°N 0.211°W

Kingswood railway station serves Kingswood in the county of Surrey. It is a late-Victorian station on the Tattenham Corner Line, 20 miles 72 chains (33.6 km) from London Charing Cross. Train services and the station are operated by Southern.

The station has a building on the up side only (platform 1), with just a metal shelter on the down side (platform 2). Part of the building is still used by Southern, with a large waiting area and ticket office on the ground floor, though this is only open during weekday morning peak travel. The upper floors and part of the ground floor are used as offices, the Tudor Business Centre. There is a small forecourt available for car parking on both sides of the station, cyclists are provided with a small shelter. The two platforms are connected by a new steel over bridge (which replaced the existing concrete bridge in early 2014).

There is a self-serve ticket machine located on each platform and Oyster smart card readers are installed at the entrance/exits on both sides of the station.

== History ==
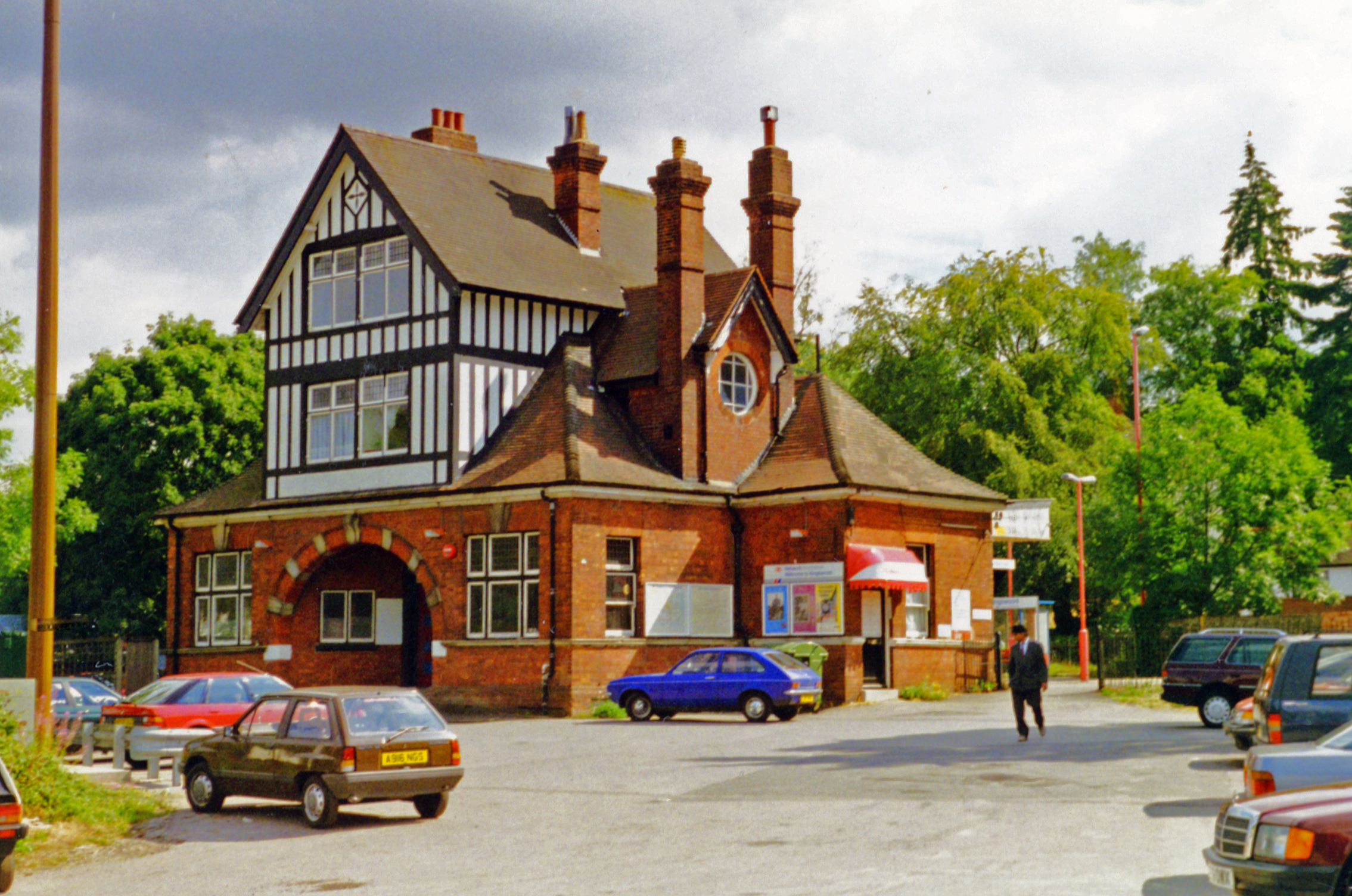
Kingswood station exterior 1995.jpg

Kingswood station originally opened in 1897 as Kingswood and Burgh Heath. It was the original terminus of the single-track Tattenham Corner Line before it was extended to Tadworth & Walton-on-the-Hill in 1900 (now Tadworth) and Tattenham Corner a year later.

An open air terrace was once provided on top of the station's platform canopy for afternoon tea. However, this only lasted until 1920 as the steam and soot from the trains beneath rendered it unprofitable.

== Services ==
All services at Kingswood are operated by Southern using Class 377 EMUs.

The typical off-peak service in trains per hour is:

- 2 tph to London Bridge (non-stop from Norwood Junction)
- 2 tph to Tattenham Corner

On Sundays, the service is reduced to hourly and runs between Tattenham Corner and Purley only. Passengers for London Bridge have to change at Purley.

| Preceding station | National Rail | Following station |
|---|---|---|
| Chipstead | Southern Tattenham Corner Line | Tadworth |

It was initially proposed that from 2018, when the Thameslink Programme is completed, services on this line would be operated with larger 12 car trains offering all day direct services to Cambridge via London Blackfriars. However, in September 2016, these proposals have been dropped; instead, services on the Tattenham Corner Line are to "remain as Southern South London Metro services with increased capacity as compared to today".
