= Reedham railway station (London) =

National Rail station in London, England

Reedham
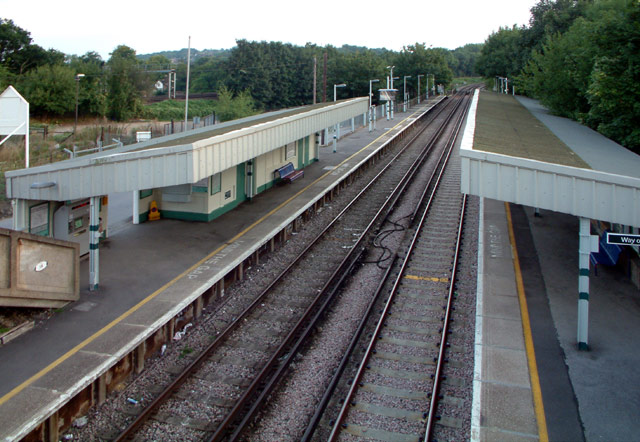
- Interactive map of Reedham

General information
- Location: Purley
- Local authority: London Borough of Croydon
- Grid reference: TQ309606
- Managed by: Southern
- Station code: RHM
- DfT category: E
- Number of platforms: 2
- Fare zone: 6

National Rail annual entry and exit
- 2020–21: ▼36,292
- 2021–22: ▲69,216
- 2022–23: ▲97,464
- 2023–24: ▼94,736
- 2024–25: ▲0.106 million

Railway companies
- Original company: South Eastern Railway
- Pre-grouping: South Eastern and Chatham Railway
- Post-grouping: Southern Railway

Key dates
- 1 March 1911: Opened as Reedham Halt
- 1 January 1917: Closed
- 1 January 1919: Reopened
- 5 July 1936: Renamed Reedham
- 12 May 1980: Renamed Reedham (Surrey)

Other information
- External links: Departures; Facilities
- Coordinates: 51.3313°N 0.1233°W

Reedham railway station is in the south of Purley in the London Borough of Croydon on the Tattenham Corner line. The local area is residential and the station is near the A23 Brighton Road. It is 15 miles 65 chains (25.4 km) measured from London Charing Cross. The Brighton Main Line is adjacent, but is not served by this station.

Although occasionally referred to as Reedham (London), it is most commonly suffixed as Reedham (Surrey) (despite not officially being part of Surrey county since the creation of the London borough of Croydon in 1965) in order to distinguish it from the station of the same name in Norfolk. Its three-letter station code is RHM.

== History ==
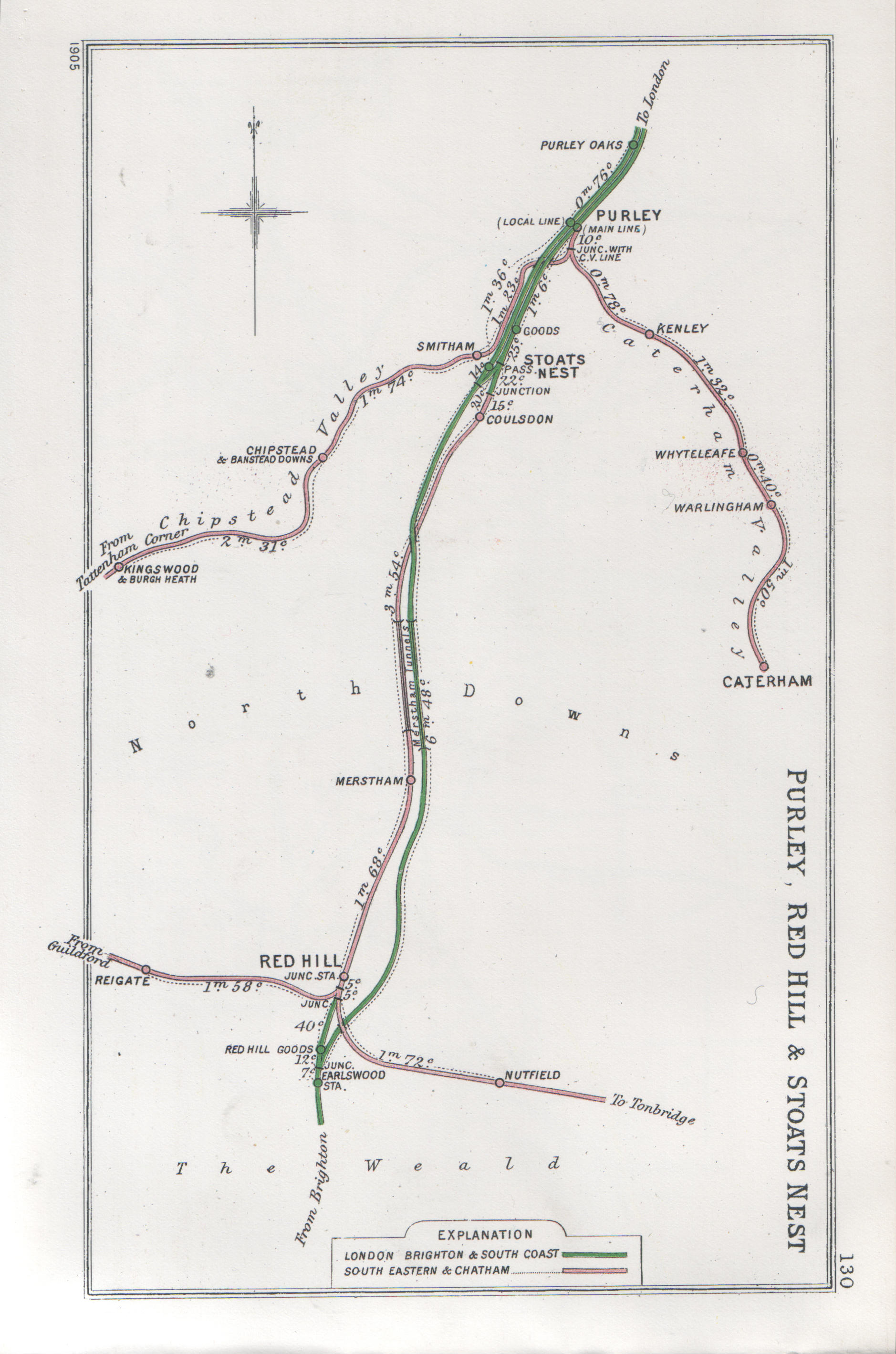
A 1905 Railway Clearing House map of lines around Reedham railway station.

The station was opened by the South Eastern and Chatham Railway on its branch line to Tattenham Corner as Reedham Halt on 1 March 1911. Situated 49 chains (990 m) from Purley railway station, it was built with 300-foot (91 m) long platforms and adjoined an overbridge crossing Old Lodge Lane in Purley. It took its name from the nearby Reedham Asylum for Fatherless Children, founded in Richmond by philanthropist Andrew Reed in 1844. The asylum was renamed Reedham Orphanage in 1904 and Reedham School in 1950. It closed in 1980, but the trust which ran it still occupies the original lodge (gatehouse) of the estate.

After a period of temporary wartime closure between 1917 and 1919, the halt became a station on 5 July 1936. On 12 May 1980, the suffix "Surrey" was added to the station's name to distinguish it from Reedham (Norfolk). Some timetables used to refer to the station as "Reedham (GLC)". Having first been lengthened in advance of electrification of the line in 1928, the platforms were again extended in 1982 to take eight-car trains in the days when a train had both a driver and a guard. However nowadays, due to lack of station CCTV to assist the driver to close the doors safely, trains without train-mounted external cameras are only permitted to open the doors on the first four carriages.

A new passenger footbridge was installed in late 2013, removing the existing disabled access; the platforms were also resurfaced. A request for full disabled access was made to Network Rail and declined in 2014.

It has Croydon's lowest passenger count in 2016 and it was the scene of a fatality in 2017. The council car park at Reedham was used as Network Rail's base to replace one of the rail bridges adjacent to the station over Christmas 2016.

The telecommunications mast adjacent to the station was increased in size again in 2017 to 25m from 22.5m inline with the planning permission granted in 2016.

It was initially proposed that from 2018, when the Thameslink Programme is completed, services on this line would be operated with larger 12 car trains offering all day direct services to Cambridge via London Blackfriars. However, in September 2016, these proposals have been dropped; instead, services on the Tattenham Corner Line are to "remain as Southern South London Metro services with increased capacity as compared to today".

== Services ==
All services at Reedham are operated by Southern using Class 377 EMUs.

The typical off-peak service in trains per hour is:

- 2 tph to London Bridge (non-stop from Norwood Junction)
- 2 tph to Tattenham Corner

On Sundays, the service is reduced to hourly and runs between Tattenham Corner and Purley only. Passengers for London Bridge have to change at Purley.

In May 2018, as part of the Thameslink Programme, the service frequency was increased from 2 to 4 trains per hour, although this has subsequently been reduced back to 2 trains per hour following the COVID-19 pandemic.

Preceding station	National Rail	Following station
Purley	Southern Tattenham Corner Line	Coulsdon Town

== Connections ==
London Buses route 312 provides service to the station. Additionally, several other routes, including 60, 166, 405, 434, 466, and Night Route N68, offer convenient stops within a 2-5 minute walking distance from the station.
