= Coulsdon North railway station =

Former railway station in England

Coulsdon North
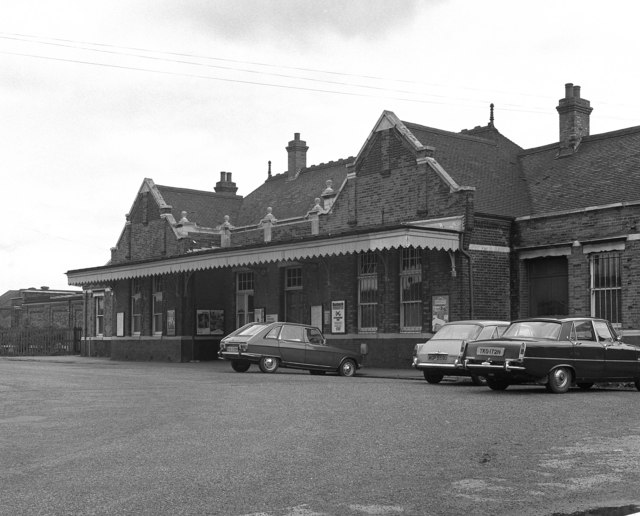

General information
- Location: Coulsdon, Croydon Surrey; England
- Coordinates: 51.3206°N 0.1344°W
- Grid reference: TQ301596
- Platforms: 4

Other information
- Status: Disused

History
- Original company: London, Brighton and South Coast Railway
- Pre-grouping: London, Brighton and South Coast Railway
- Post-grouping: Southern Railway

Key dates
- 5 November 1899: Opened as Stoats Nest and Cane Hill
- 1 June 1911: Renamed Coulsdon and Smitham Downs
- 9 July 1923: Renamed Coulsdon West
- 1 August 1923: Renamed Coulsdon North
- 3 October 1983: Closed
Location

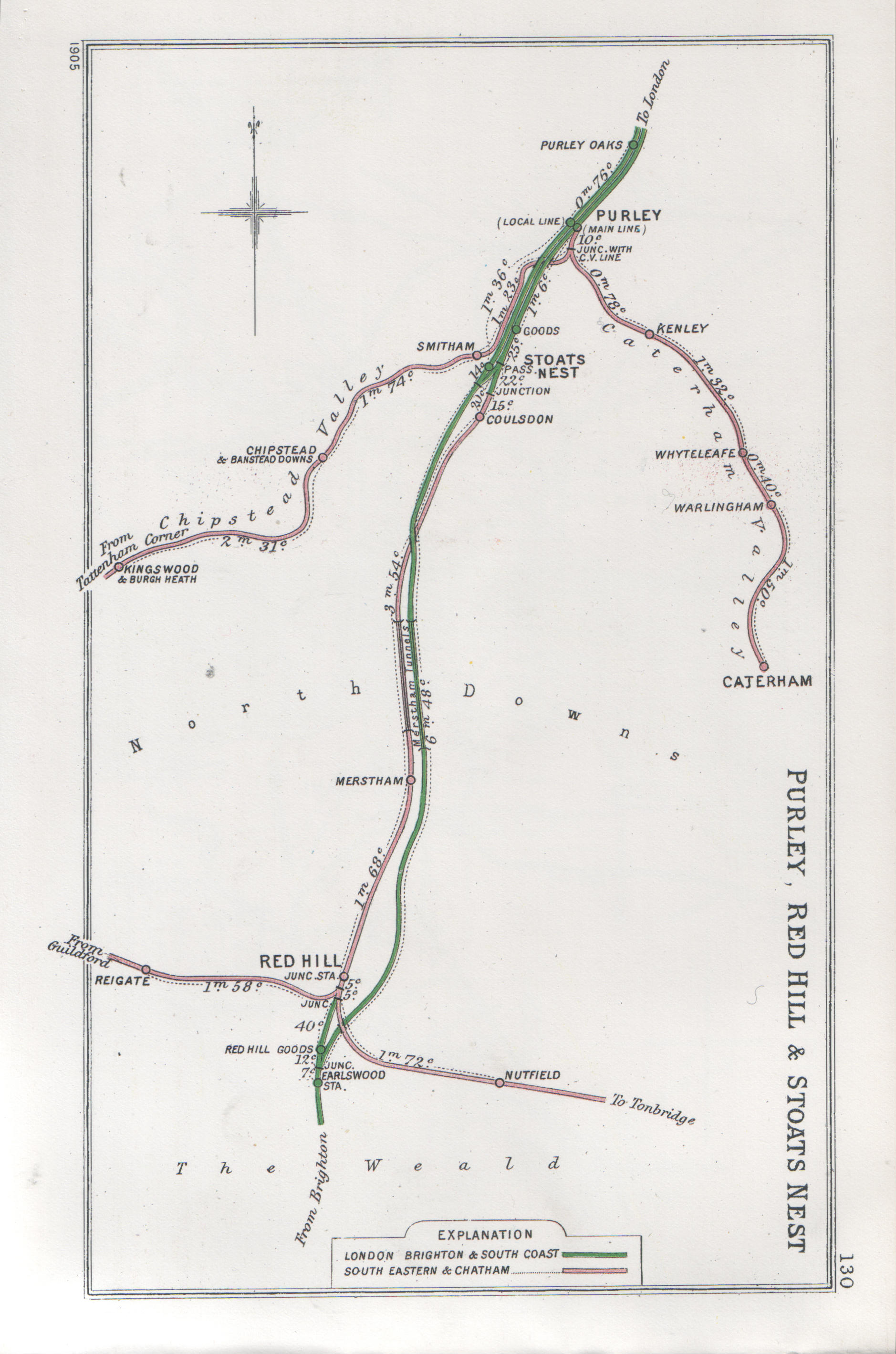
A 1905 Railway Clearing House map of lines around Coulsdon North railway station.

Coulsdon North is a closed railway station that served Coulsdon, Croydon, England, on the Brighton Main Line.

== Stoat's Nest ==
The first station in Coulsdon was opened by the London and Brighton Railway on 12 July 1841, named after a nearby settlement. It stood approximately at the junction of present-day Windermere Road and Stoat's Nest Road. Nothing remains of this station today. It was one mile south of Godstone Road station (later called Caterham Junction and then Purley), and was the first station to serve Epsom Downs Racecourse, albeit a distant eight miles (13 km) away. It was in service until December 1856, when Godstone Road station reopened and the L&BR successor, the London Brighton and South Coast Railway (LB&SCR) had its own route from Croydon to Epsom.

== Opening ==
The station was opened as "Stoats Nest and Cane Hill" on 5 November 1899 by the London, Brighton and South Coast Railway (LB&SCR). It took its name partly from the nearby Cane Hill asylum and partly from the nearby Stoats Nest village. The station kept its name until 1911 when it became known as "Coulsdon and Smitham Downs".

The Coulsdon North station was built by the LB&SCR and opened simultaneously with the widening to four tracks south of South Croydon and the opening of the Quarry Line, a "fast track" route which enabled the LB&SCR's South Coast expresses to bypass the line through Redhill. At the time of the new Stoats Nest's opening, it was the second station operating in the area, Coulsdon South (then named "Coulsdon") having been opened by the SER on 1 October 1889.

The LB&SCR equipped the new Stoats Nest station with four platforms: two on the Quarry Line and two terminal platforms with through access only to sidings beyond the station. It served as a through station for services from London Victoria to Brighton, as well as a terminus for services from Victoria via Streatham Common or Crystal Palace. The station also had a six-road carriage storage area just to its south.

== Grouping ==
Following the grouping ordered by the Railways Act 1921, the new operator, the Southern Railway, changed the name of the station to "Coulsdon West" with effect from 9 July 1923. However, this name only lasted 22 days before being changed to "Coulsdon North" on 1 August 1923.

The effect of the grouping - entailing the merger of the SER and LB&SCR - was that Coulsdon North lost its regular services on the Brighton Main Line. Nevertheless, the Southern Railway extended the LB&SCR's AC overhead electric system powered at 6700 V to the station in 1925, only to announce a year later that all AC lines were to be converted to the 660 V DC used by the neighbouring London and South Western Railway. This entailed the conversion of Coulsdon North to third rail in September 1929. It was one of the last to move across from the old overhead electric system.

== Decline and closure ==
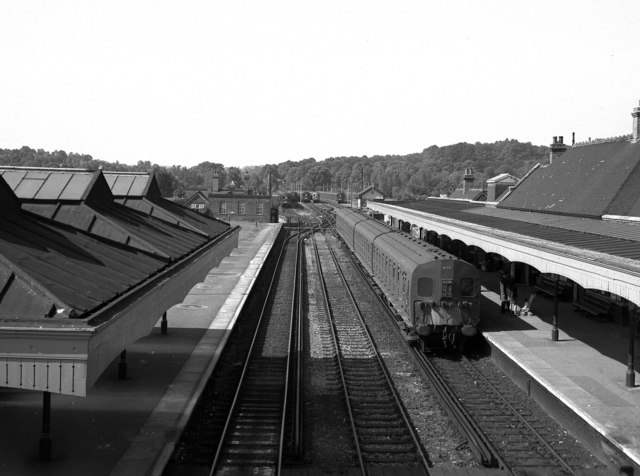
View south from the footbridge in 1968

The situation of Coulsdon North on the so-called "fast track" of the Quarry Line posed pathing problems, as the route had to give priority to express services heading for the South Coast. Accordingly, through services to the coast were withdrawn, and the fast platforms saw only occasional use for special trains. Furthermore, the opening of Smitham (now called Coulsdon Town) in 1904 had created three stations in the same area and, by the 1960s, the decline had begun to set in. Only the terminal platforms were regularly used, for stopping trains from Victoria or London Bridge. Weekend passenger services were withdrawn in 1965, the goods yard was closed in 1968, and from May 1970, passenger services only operated at peak hours on weekdays. The station finally closed in 1983 as part of the resignalling of the Brighton main line.

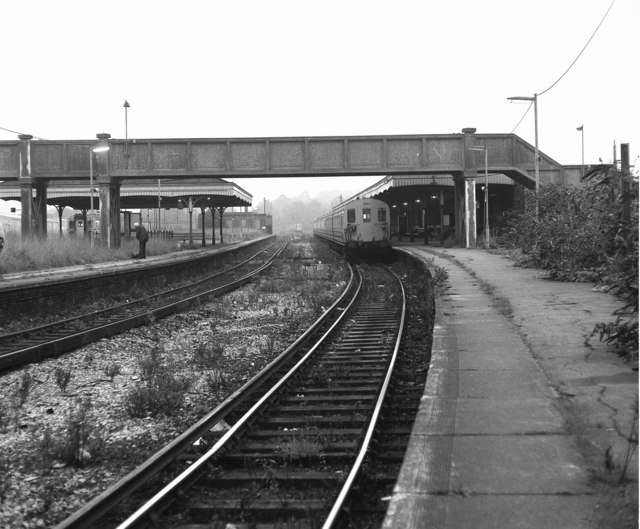
Last day at Coulsdon North

The last passenger train ran on the evening of Friday 30 September 1983, a special to East Croydon. The station and its sidings were officially closed as of Monday 3 October 1983. The station was demolished shortly afterwards.

During an archaeological excavation in March 1994, the arched foundation brickwork of the station subway was found. The site of the station buildings has since been redeveloped with small industrial units. In 2006 the A23 Coulsdon Relief Road was constructed through its site. Only the station approach road, alongside which are a few sections of railway fencing, indicate its former site.

== 1907 accident ==
Stoats Nest filming accident

Details
- Date: 17 April 1907; 12:26
- Location: Coulsdon North railway station
- Country: England
- Line: Brighton Main Line
- Operator: London Brighton and South Coast Railway
- Cause: Poor communication

Statistics
- Trains: 1
- Deaths: 1
- Injured: 0

On 17 April 1907, a locomotive, operated under the instructions of the station master, overran its intended stop point, mortally injuring a local resident who without the train crew's knowledge was lying in the path of the train as part of filming by the Clarendon Film Company.

== 1910 accident ==
Stoats Nest rail accident

Details
- Date: 29 January 1910; 16:30
- Location: Coulsdon North railway station
- Country: England
- Line: Brighton Main Line
- Operator: London Brighton and South Coast Railway
- Cause: Rolling stock failure

Statistics
- Trains: 1
- Deaths: 7
- Injured: 65 (8 serious)

On 29 January 1910 the Brighton to London Victoria express split in two when passing points at the station and the rear part of the train, consisting of two third-class carriages and a Pullman, derailed and crashed into the platform at 40 mph (65 km/h). Seven people were killed and eight seriously injured. The US Consul General, Robert Wynne, was travelling in the Pullman but was unhurt. The subsequent enquiry determined that one wheel of a carriage had become detached from its axle.

Preceding station	Disused railways	Following station
Purley	British Rail; Southern Region; Brighton Main Line	Terminus or Earlswood

== See also ==
- List of closed railway stations in London
