= Bonsor baronets =

Baronetcy in the Baronetage of the United Kingdom

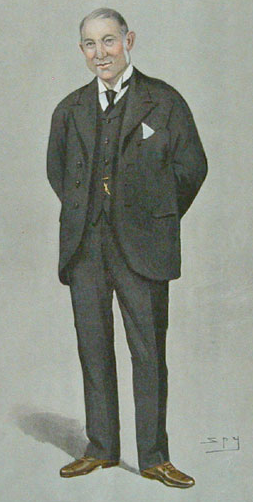
Sir Cosmo Bonsor, 1st Baronet, by Leslie Ward, 1895

The Bonsor Baronetcy, of Kingswood, in the parish of Epsom, in the County of Surrey, is a title in the Baronetage of the United Kingdom. It was created on 26 January 1925 for Cosmo Bonsor, Chairman of the South Eastern Railway, Conservative Member of Parliament for Wimbledon and a Director of the Bank of England. As of 2023 the title is held by his great-great-grandson, Alexander, the fifth Baronet, who succeeded his father in 2023. He became engaged in November 2005 to Jane Troughton, marrying the following year.

The family seat is Liscombe Park, Soulbury, Buckinghamshire. It is an Elizabethan manor hall.

== Bonsor baronets, of Kingswood (1925) ==
Escutcheon of the Bonsor baronets of Kingswood

- Sir (Henry) Cosmo Orme Bonsor, 1st Baronet (1848–1929)
- Sir Reginald Bonsor, 2nd Baronet (1879–1959)
- Sir Bryan Cosmo Bonsor, MC, 3rd Baronet (1916–1977)
- Sir Nicholas Cosmo Bonsor, 4th Baronet (1942–2023)
- Sir Alexander Cosmo Walrond Bonsor, 5th Baronet (born 1976)

The heir apparent is the present holder's son Cosmo Bonsor (born 2007).
