= Tattenham Corner line =

Railway line in southern England

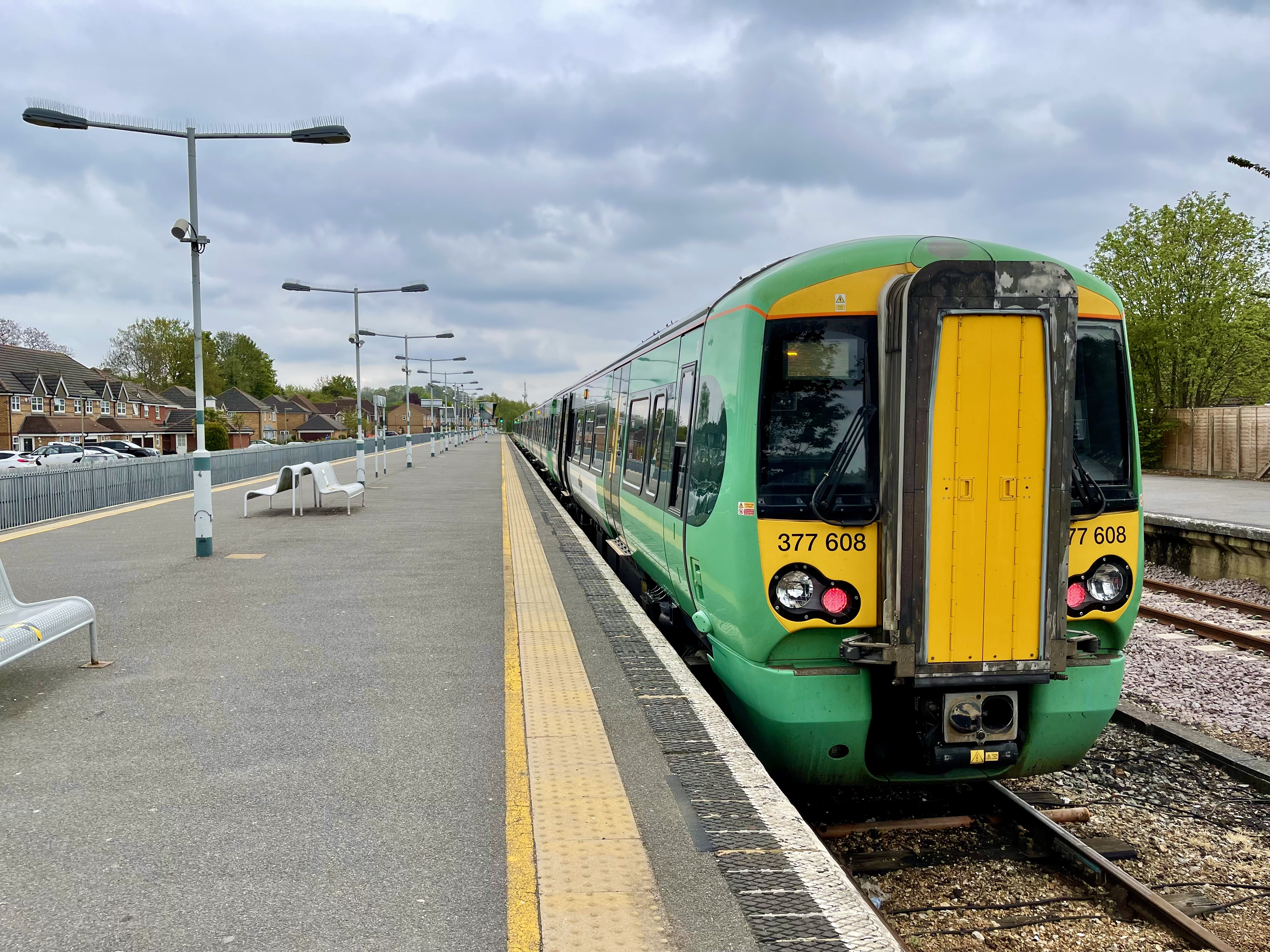
- A Southern Class 377 at Tattenham Corner

Overview
- Status: Operational
- Owner: Network Rail
- Locale: Greater London; Surrey
- Termini: London Bridge; Tattenham Corner

Service
- Type: Commuter rail, Suburban rail
- System: National Rail
- Operator: Southern
- Rolling stock: Class 377 "Electrostar"

History
- Opened: 2 November 1897

Technical
- Track gauge: 1,435 mm (4 ft 8 1/2 in) standard gauge
- Electrification: 750 V DC third rail
Route map
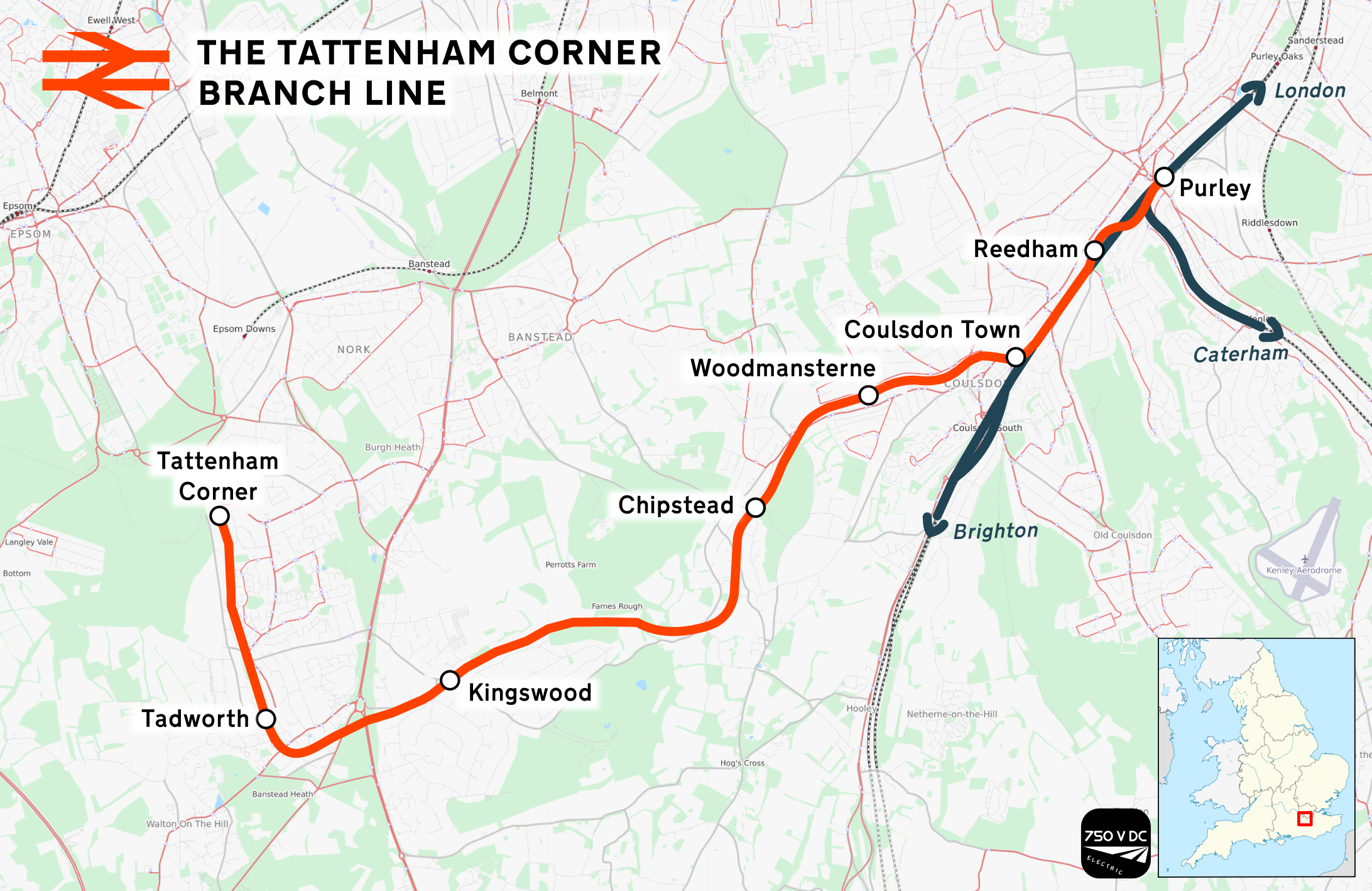
(Click to expand)

The Tattenham Corner line is an 8-mile-14-ch (13.2 km) railway line in Surrey and Greater London, England. It runs from its western terminus at Tattenham Corner, near Epsom Downs Racecourse, to a junction with the Caterham line south of Purley. There are intermediate stations at Tadworth, Kingswood, Chipstead, Woodmansterne, Coulsdon Town and Reedham. All seven stations are managed by Southern, which operates all passenger trains. Most services run between Tattenham Corner and London Bridge via East Croydon.

The line was promoted in two parts by the Epsom Downs Extension Railway and the Chipstead Valley Railway companies. The first section, between Purley Junction and Kingswood, opened on 2 November 1897 as a single-track line. The South Eastern Railway (SER) operated all services from the outset. The SER took over the line in 1899 and was responsible for finishing its construction and the provision of double track. Tattenham Corner station finally opened on 4 June 1901, the day of the Epsom Derby. The Southern Railway electrified the line using the 750 V DC third-rail system in 1928.

== Infrastructure and services ==
The Tattenham Corner line is a railway line in Surrey and Greater London, England. It runs for 8 miles 14 ch (13.2 km) from its terminus at Tattenham Corner station to an at-grade junction with the Caterham line, 15 mi 23 ch (24.6 km) down the line from London Charing Cross and 10 ch (200 m) south of Purley station. The maximum speed permitted on the branch is 60 mph (97 km/h). The line is electrified using the 750 V DC third-rail system and is double tracked throughout. Signalling is controlled from Three Bridges and Track Circuit Block is in operation. There are two tunnels on the line – the 310 yd (280 m) Kingswood Tunnel and the 37 yd (34 m) Hoppity Tunnel – both of which are to the east of Tadworth station. The steepest gradient on the line, between Chipstead Viaduct and the summit at Tadworth Street Bridge, is 1 in 80.

The seven stations on the branch are managed by Southern, which operates all services. Tattenham Corner has three operational platforms, but the other six stations have two platforms each. (Note: Platform 1 at Chipstead station is the shortest on the line with a length of 117.7 m (386 ft).) The buffer stops at Tattenham Corner are 23 miles 37 ch (37.8 km) down the line from London Charing Cross, when measured via Norwood Junction.

The off-peak service pattern is two trains per hour in each direction between Tattenham Corner and London Bridge. At Purley, trains join with or split from a train travelling to or from Caterham. Most trains serve all stations between East Croydon and Tattenham Corner, but run non-stop between London Bridge and East Croydon. Off-peak trains from Tattenham Corner typically reach Purley on the Brighton Main Line in around 23 minutes and arrive at London Bridge in about an hour. The entirety of the Tattenham Corner line is in Zone 6 of the London fare zones.

Stations on the Tattenham Corner line (ordered from east to west)
Station	Distance from Charing Cross via Norwood Junction	Number of platforms	Opening date	Original name	Ref.
Reedham	15 mi 65 ch (25.4 km)	2	1 March 1911	Reedham Halt	
Coulsdon Town	16 mi 66 ch (27.1 km)	2	1 January 1904	Smitham	
Woodmansterne	17 mi 40 ch (28.2 km)	2	17 July 1932		
Chipstead	18 mi 41 ch (29.8 km)	2	1 November 1897		
Kingswood	20 mi 72 ch (33.6 km)	2	1 November 1897	Kingswood & Burgh Heath	
Tadworth	22 mi 18 ch (35.8 km)	2	1 July 1900	Tadworth & Walton-on-the-Hill	
Tattenham Corner	23 mi 37 ch (37.8 km)	3	4 June 1901		

== History ==
=== Proposals and authorisations ===
Epsom Downs Extension Railway Act 1892
- Act of Parliament
- Parliament of the United Kingdom
- Long title: An Act for making a Railway from the Epsom Downs Branch of the London Brighton and South Coast Railway to near Walton-on-the-Hill in the County of Surrey and for other purposes.
- Citation: 55 & 56 Vict. c. cxlv

Dates
- Royal assent: 27 June 1892

The first proposals for a railway serving Tattenham Corner and Tadworth were drawn up in 1891 and a private bill was presented to Parliament in December 1891. The line, called the Epsom Downs Extension Railway (EDER), was to run from a station near Walton-on-the-Hill northwards to a junction with the Epsom Downs Branch near the Drift Bridge. The driving force behind the scheme was a group of local landowners, including Cosmo Bonsor, later the chairman of the South Eastern Railway (SER). (Note: Construction of the Epsom Downs Extension Railway was to cost £65,000, the majority of which was offered by Cosmo Bonsor.) Although the Epsom Downs Extension Railway Act 1892 (55 & 56 Vict. c. cxlv) was passed, there were several objectors including the Epsom Grand Stand Association, who feared that their plans to extend the racecourse would be jeopardised by the construction of the line. The Surrey Advertiser and County Times reported a formal ceremony on 6 June 1892 marking the start of construction, although royal assent was not granted until 27 June.

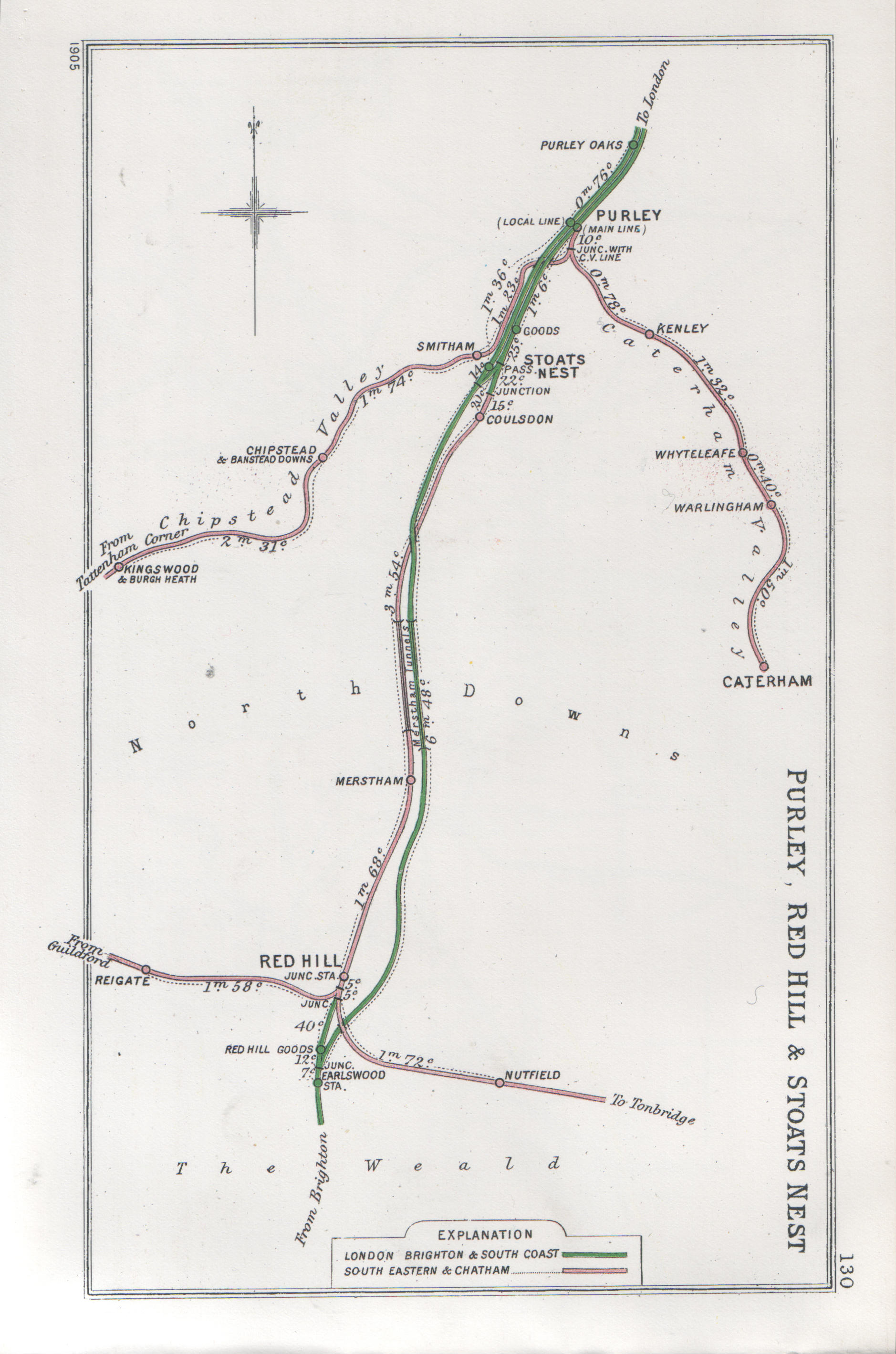
A 1905 Railway Clearing House map showing the eastern end of the Tattenham Corner line and its connection to the Caterham line and Brighton Main Line

Chipstead Valley Railway Act 1893
- Act of Parliament
- Parliament of the United Kingdom
- Long title: An Act for incorporating the Chipstead Valley Railway Company and authorising the construction of Railways from Walton-on-the-Hill (Surrey) to Purley and for other purposes.
- Citation: 56 & 57 Vict. c. cliii

Dates
- Royal assent: 27 July 1893

Text of statute as originally enacted

Epsom Downs Extension Railway Act 1897
- Act of Parliament
- Parliament of the United Kingdom
- Long title: An Act for conferring further powers on the Epsom Downs Extension Railway Company for the construction of works and otherwise in relation to their undertaking and for other purposes.
- Citation: 60 & 61 Vict. c. xlii

Dates
- Royal assent: 3 June 1897

Text of statute as originally enacted

A second line, the Chipstead Valley Railway (CVR), running from the southern terminus of the EDER to a junction with the SER Caterham line south of Purley, was proposed in 1893. Authorisation was granted by an act of Parliament, the Chipstead Valley Railway Act 1893 (56 & 57 Vict. c. cliii), on 27 July of that year. In proposing this second scheme, Bonsor had intended that the London, Brighton and South Coast Railway (LBSCR) would take over both the CVR and the EDER, and combine them into a single railway that it would then operate. The LBSCR refused and the CVR began to purchase the necessary land to construct their line. In October 1896, the SER agreed to seek parliamentary approval to take over both lines, which were by then under construction. The following year, the EDER was given approval in the Epsom Downs Extension Railway Act 1897 (60 & 61 Vict. c. xlii) to abandon its plans to build the section of its line north of Tattenham Corner. The SER formally absorbed the CVR and EDER in 1899.

=== Construction and openings ===
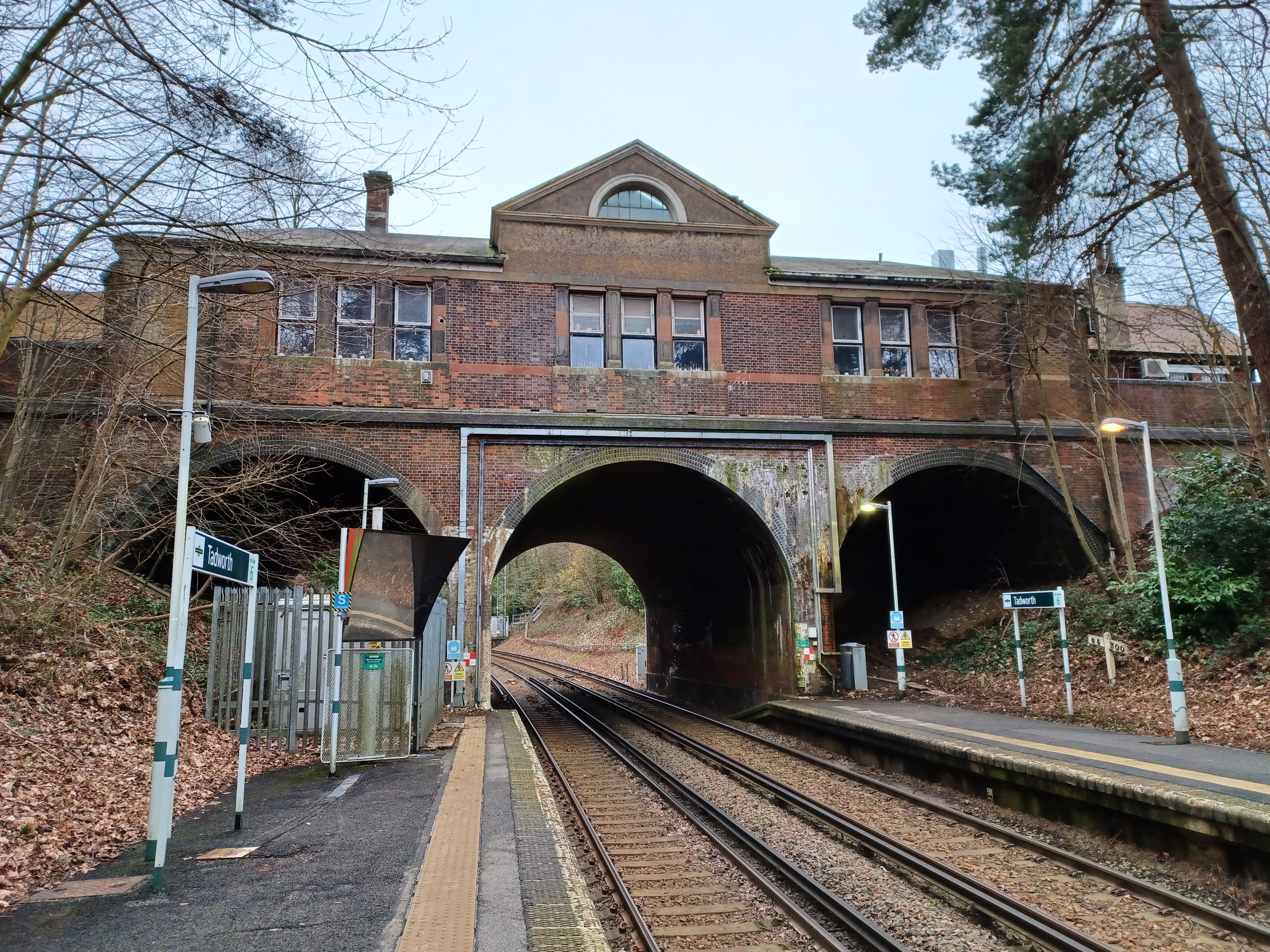
Tadworth station. The line is in a deep cutting at this point and the main station building is on a bridge above the tracks

As initially surveyed, the CVR was to have been a single-track railway costing £11,000 per mile to build. The SER was unhappy with the proposals and provided an additional £3000 per mile to widen the formation for two tracks and to reduce the maximum gradient from 1 in 60 to 1 in 80. On 2 November 1897, the section between Purley Junction and Kingswood opened as a single-track line with a passing loop at Chipstead, the only intermediate station. (Note: The railway historian, Adrian Gray, writes that regular, timetabled services between Purley and Kingswood probably began around a week after the formal opening on 2 November 1897.) From the outset, the line was worked by the SER. The section to Tadworth was opened as a single line on 1 July 1900. Double track was commissioned between Purley and Kingswood the following day and to Tadworth in November of the same year. All three CVR stations were provided with goods yards.

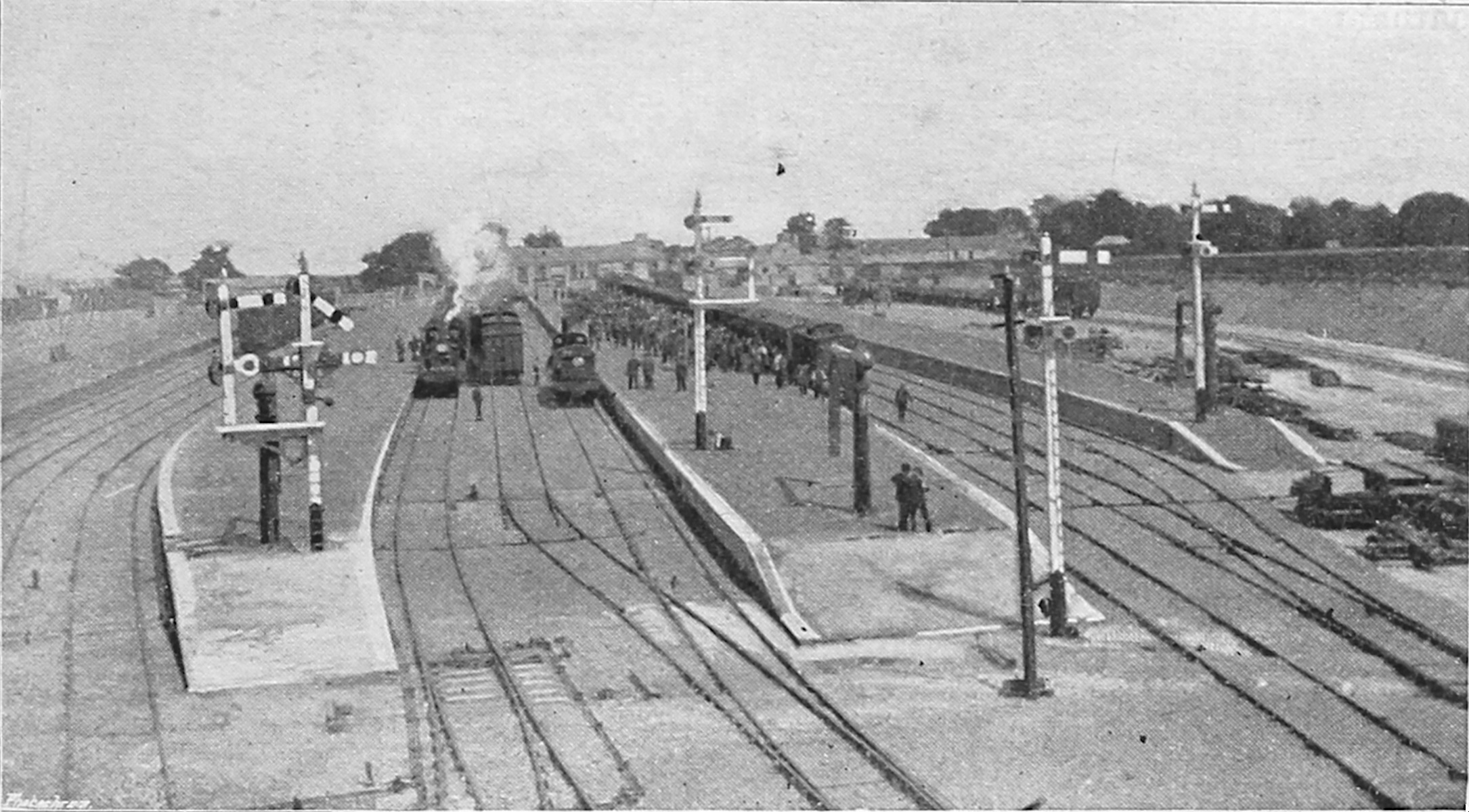
Tattenham Corner station in 1901

The final section of the line, between Tadworth and Tattenham Corner stations, opened on 4 June 1901, the day of the Epsom Derby. The terminus was laid out to cope with the volume of passengers travelling to the racecourse and had six operational platforms. Between 1902 and 1928, it saw no regular timetabled services and only opened for race day and summer excursion specials. Trains taking horses to the racecourse also used the station and the Epsom Grand Stand Association erected stables for 100 horses nearby.

=== Later 20th century developments ===
Detailed plans for Smitham station (now Coulsdon Town) had been drawn up in 1898 and 1899, but it was not opened until 1 January 1904. It was very close to Coulsdon North station on the Brighton Main Line, which had opened on 5 November 1899 and closed on 1 October 1983. Reedham station opened on 1 March 1911 as a halt. It closed for two years between 1 January 1917 and 1 January 1919, and became a staffed station on 5 July 1936.

During the First World War, racing at Epsom Downs was suspended and the area was used for military training camps. The line was used extensively for transport of troops and supplies. Following the end of the war, sidings at Tattenham Corner station were used to store surplus War Department locomotives. During the Second World War, casualties from the liberation of France were transported to a field hospital at Epsom Downs Racecourse via the line.

Electrification was first proposed in 1913 by the LBSCR. The company offered to install its overhead 6,700 V system, on the condition that it could lease the line from the South Eastern and Chatham Railway (SECR, the successor to the SER) and operate all services. Following the end of the First World War, the SECR engineer, Alfred Raworth, recommended that the LBSCR scheme should be adopted. The plans were not pursued and under the Railways Act 1921, the Tattenham Corner line became part of the London Central Division of the Southern Railway in 1923. A new proposal to electrify the line using the 750 V DC third-rail system was authorised in August 1926. (Note: The 1926-1928 electrification scheme was part of a wider £3.75M programme to electrify lines leading to London Victoria. As part of the same initiative, lines with overhead wires were converted to third rail electrification.) Electric services started running between Purley and Tadworth on 25 March 1928 and the platforms at Reedham, Chipstead and Kingswood were lengthened to accommodate the new rolling stock. Initially the new trains used the same timings as their steam-hauled predecessors, but on 17 June 1928 a new, accelerated timetable was introduced, which also restored regular services to Tattenham Corner.

Woodmansterne station opened on 17 July 1932. Taking the form of an island platform, linked by a concrete bridge to both sides of the line, it served a new area of semi-detached and terraced housing. The necessary land was donated by the developers, who also contributed around a fifth of the cost of construction. Woodmansterne signal box opened on 13 April 1932 and closed on 12 May 1963. Kingswood signal box closed on 2 December 1962.

A major resignalling project, in which colour light signals were installed, was commissioned on in the second half of 1970. Smitham signal box closed on 16 August, followed by the box at Tadworth on 29 November that year.

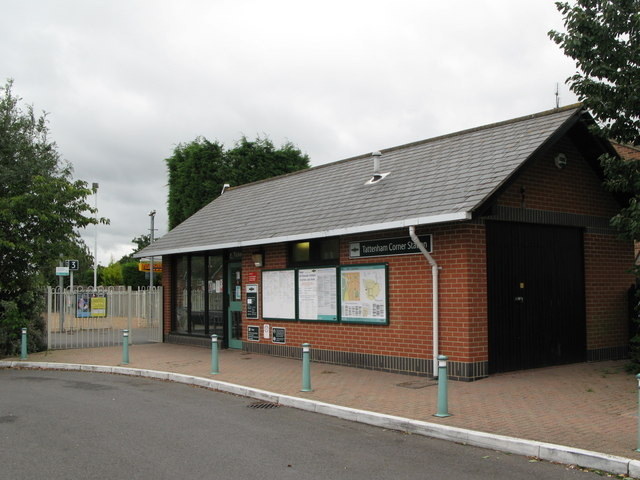
Tattenham Corner station building, opened in August 1994

The track layout at Tattenham Corner was altered in 1971, reducing the number of operational platforms to three. The redundant land no longer required for the terminus was sold in 1979 and 1980 for housebuilding. The original wooden station building was damaged beyond economic repair on 1 December 1993, when a train crashed through the buffer stops. The current single-storey ticket office was opened the following August.

=== 21st century ===
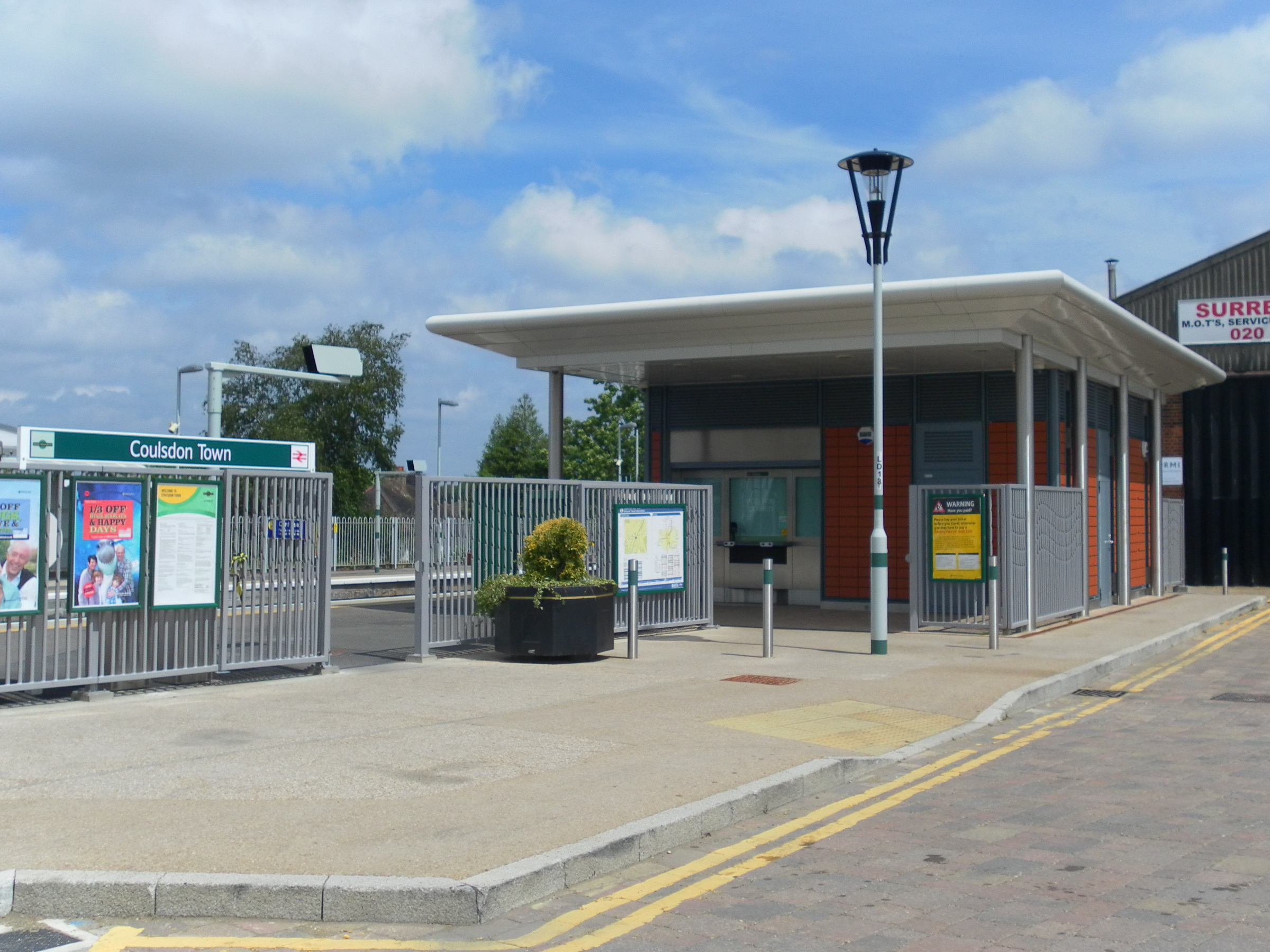
The new station building at Coulsdon Town in May 2011

Smitham station was renamed "Coulsdon Town" in May 2011, following a consultation with local residents. A new building had been constructed at the station the previous year.

Under the Thameslink Programme, the Tattenham Corner line was to have been served by 8-car Class 700 trains to destinations north of the River Thames via London Blackfriars. However, in late 2017, these plans were altered and the line was dropped from the programme in favour of running Thameslink trains to Rainham, Kent. The following May, Southern introduced 10-car trains to the Tattenham Corner line and reduced journey times to London. In 2022, the Sunday service on the route was reduced to a shuttle between Tattenham Corner and Purley, requiring passengers to change trains to continue their journeys to London.

== Bibliography ==
- Brown, David (2009). Development of the London Suburban Network and Its Trains. Southern Electric. Vol. 1. Crowthorne: Capital Transport Publishing. ISBN 978-1-85-414330-3.
- Gray, Adrian (1990). South Eastern Railway. Midhurst: Middleton Press. ISBN 978-0-90-652085-7.
- Jackson, Alan A. (1978). London's Local Railways. Newton Abbot: David & Charles. ISBN 978-0-71-537479-5.
- Jackson, Alan A. (1999). The railway in Surrey. Penryn: Atlantic Transport Publishers. ISBN 978-0-90-689990-8.
- Mitchell, Vic; Smith, Keith (1993). Caterham and Tattenham Corner. Midhurst: Middleton Press. ISBN 978-1-87-379325-1.
- Nock, O.S. (1961). The South Eastern and Chatham Railway. Shepperton: Ian Allan. ISBN 978-0-71-100268-5.
- Oppitz, Leslie (1988). Surrey railways remembered. Newbury: Countryside Books. ISBN 978-1-85-306005-2.
- Quick, Michael (2023) [2001]. Railway Passenger Stations in Great Britain (PDF) (5.05 ed.). London: Railway and Canal Historical Society.
- White, H.P. (1961). Southern England. A regional history of the railways of Great Britain. Vol. 2. Phoenix House.
- "Kent / Sussex / Wessex Routes Sectional Appendix" (PDF). Network Rail. 2009.
- "Delivering a better railway for a better Britain | Route Specifications: South East" (PDF). Network Rail. 2016.
