= Purley railway station =

National Rail station in London, England

Purley
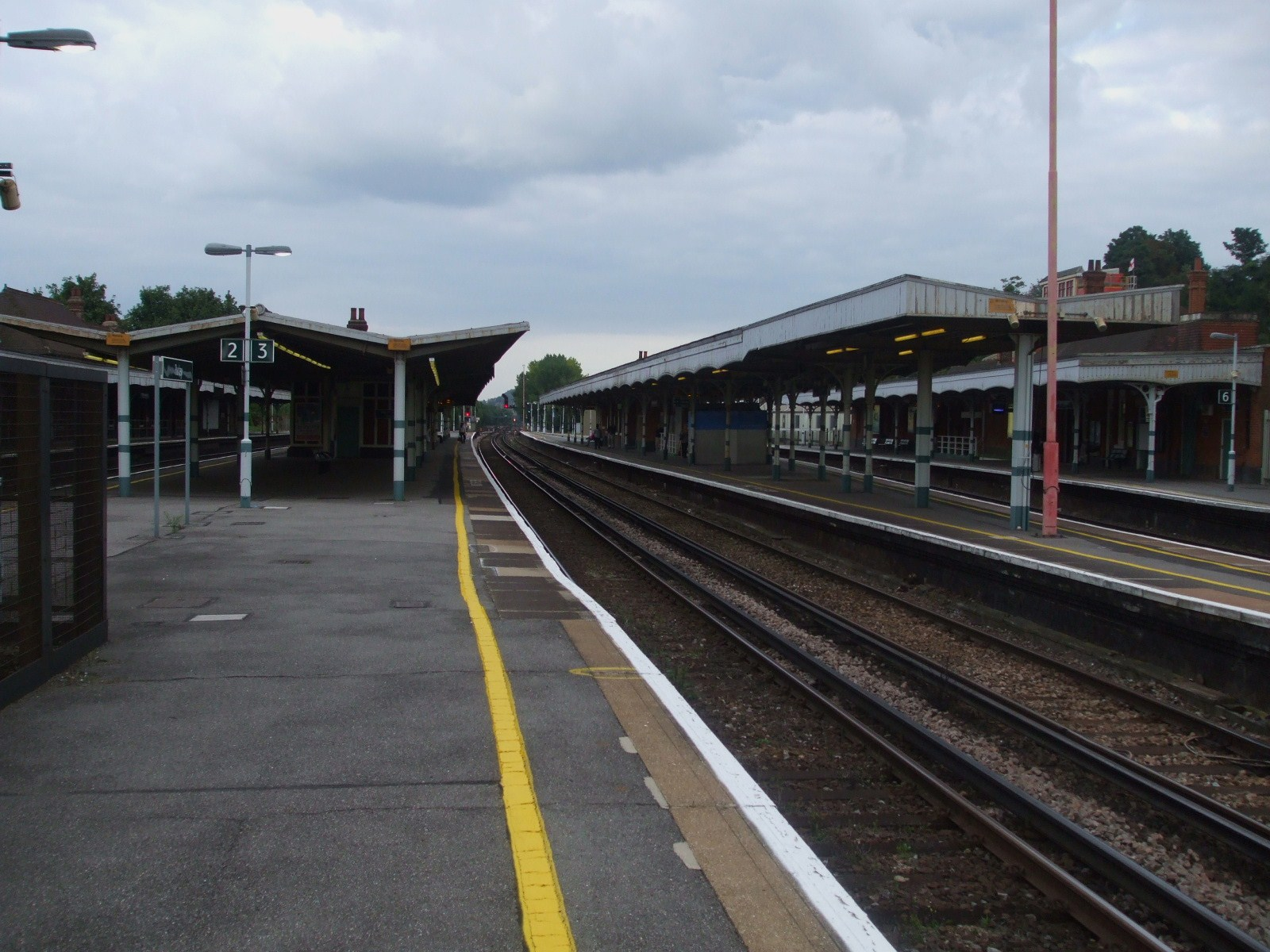
- Interactive map of Purley

General information
- Location: Purley
- Local authority: London Borough of Croydon
- Managed by: Southern
- Station code: PUR
- DfT category: C2
- Number of platforms: 6
- Accessible: Yes
- Fare zone: 6
- Toilet facilities: Yes

National Rail annual entry and exit
- 2020–21: ▼0.808 million
- Interchange: ▼0.140 million
- 2021–22: ▲1.864 million
- Interchange: ▲0.331 million
- 2022–23: ▲2.348 million
- Interchange: ▲0.549 million
- 2023–24: ▲2.568 million
- Interchange: ▲0.575 million
- 2024–25: ▲2.777 million
- Interchange: ▲0.577 million

Railway companies
- Original company: London & Brighton Railway
- Pre-grouping: London, Brighton & South Coast Railway
- Post-grouping: Southern Railway

Key dates
- 12 July 1841: Opened as Godstone Road
- 1 October 1847: Closed
- 5 August 1856: Reopened as Caterham Junction
- 1 October 1888: Renamed Purley

Other information
- External links: Departures; Facilities
- Coordinates: 51.3377°N 0.1135°W

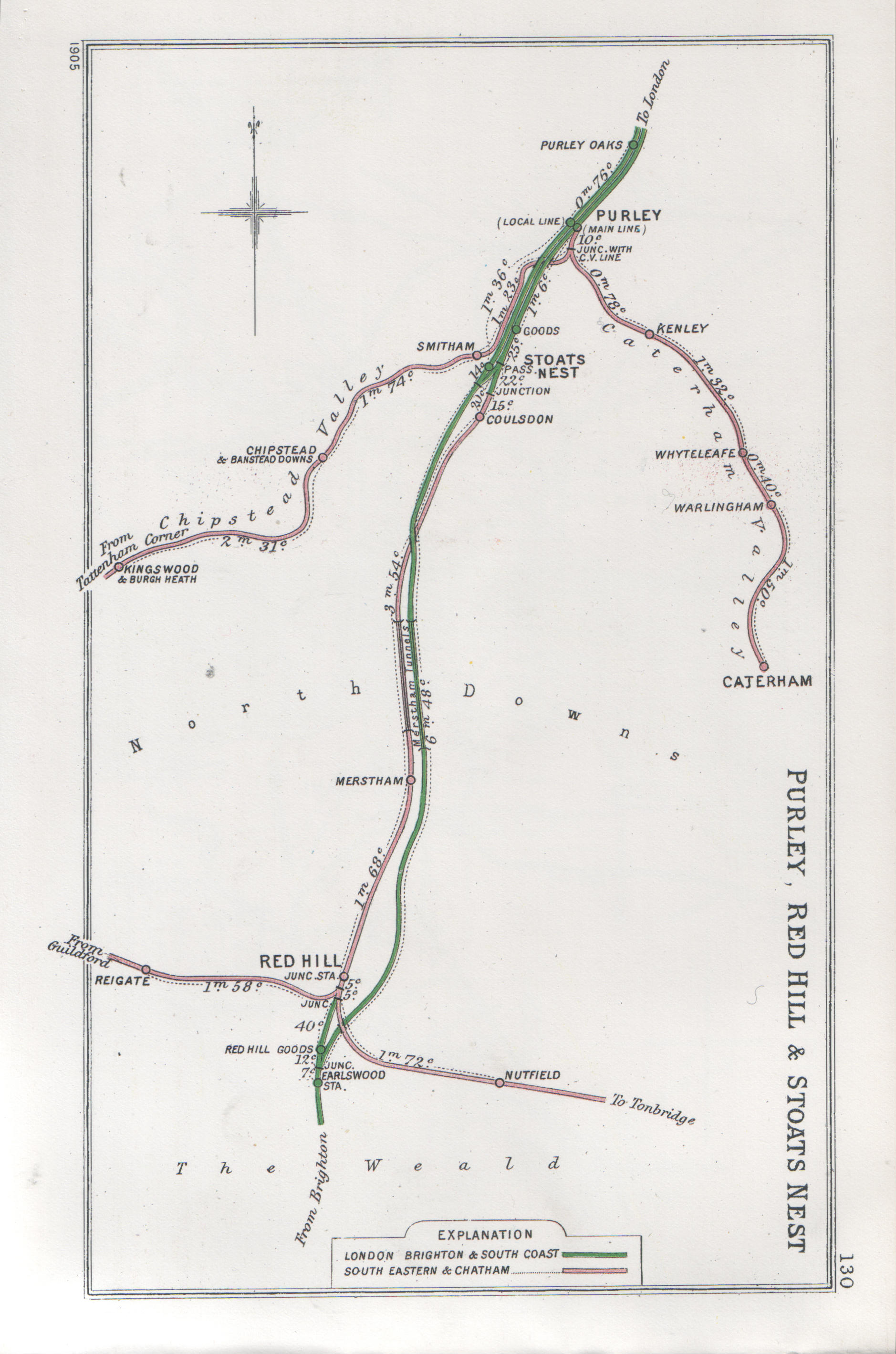
A 1905 Railway Clearing House map of lines around Purley railway station.

Purley railway station is in the London Borough of Croydon on the Brighton Main Line, 13 miles 29 chains (21.50 km) measured from London Bridge (15 miles 13 chains (24.40 km) from Charing Cross), in London fare zone 6. It is a junction, with branches to Caterham and Tattenham Corner.

== History ==
Purley station has been known by three different names.

=== Godstone Road ===
The station was opened by the London & Brighton Railway on 12 July 1841 as Godstone Road. Due to low passenger traffic, this was closed on 1 October 1847 by the London, Brighton & South Coast Railway (LB&SCR), which had opened the new Stoat's Nest station 1 mile (1.6 km) away at Coulsdon.

=== Caterham Junction ===
In 1855 a proposal by a local company to connect the sandstone quarries at Caterham to the main line railway became embroiled in a long-running dispute between the LB&SCR and the rival South Eastern Railway (SER), which resulted in the reopening of the station as Caterham Junction. The proposed line was in the territory of the SER, and was to be operated by that company. It would have to join the railway system on a section of the LB&SCR, where the SER had running powers but no stations. The new railway had to sue the LB&SCR to force it to allow the junction with its line and to reopen the station. On 5 August 1856 the station reopened with the opening of the single track Caterham branch.

=== Purley ===
The station was renamed Purley on 1 October 1888, and rebuilt between c. 1896 and 1899 during the widening of the main line between East Croydon and the beginning of the new Quarry Line at Coulsdon North in 1899. The SER built a line from Purley to Kingswood, extended to Tattenham Corner between 1897 and 1901. By the latter date it had become the South Eastern & Chatham Railway. The main station building facade reads 1899 as the year of construction.

== Accidents and incidents ==
On 22 September 1873, John Cunliffe Pickersgill-Cunliffe, a former member of Parliament, was struck by a train at the then Caterham Junction station. He died two weeks later at Guy's Hospital. At the time there was no bridge or underpass between two of the station's four platforms requiring passengers who wished to transfer between them to walk across the line.

On 22 December 1894, a collision between a light engine and a passenger train injured six people.

The Purley station rail crash on 4 March 1989 occurred just to the north of the station, and left five dead and 94 injured. A memorial garden was created at the station to commemorate this.

On the night of 5 July 2002 a fire occurred on the 23:15 service from Caterham to London Bridge. A rail attendant, Philip Cable, helped put out the fire, and suffered an asthma attack and collapsed. He died at Mayday Hospital in Croydon a few hours later. A charge of manslaughter was laid against Karl Lacey, who was aged 16 at the time of the fire, and had set fire to newspapers and cushions in the carriage. After being found guilty, he was sentenced to four years' youth custody.

== Platforms ==
Platform 1 and 2 are normally used only on early mornings and when engineering works dictate. At all other times, services on the Brighton Main Line run limited stop between East Croydon and Brighton: these trains, together with Gatwick Express and Thameslink services, pass through platforms 1 and 2. During 2008 a fence was erected to prevent access to Platform 2, for safety reasons. Gates at both end of this fence are opened by staff for the few trains that stop.

Platform 3 is used for main line services to London Bridge, London Victoria and Thameslink services to Bedford.

Platform 4 is used for main line services to Horsham and Reigate, Thameslink services to Three Bridges and Sunday services to Bognor Regis.

Platform 5 and 6 serve the branch lines to Tattenham Corner and Caterham. Both these platforms can be used by trains in either direction, though platform 5 is primarily northbound towards London and platform 6 is usually southbound.

== Services ==
Services at Purley are operated by Southern and Thameslink.

The typical off-peak service in trains per hour is:

Southern

- 2 tph to London Victoria (semi-fast)
- 2 tph to London Bridge (semi-fast)
- 2 tph to Reigate via Redhill
- 2 tph to Caterham
- 2 tph to Tattenham Corner

Southern services at Purley are operated using Class 377 EMUs.

Thameslink

- 2 tph to Bedford via London Bridge
- 2 tph to Three Bridges via Redhill

Thameslink also operate an hourly night service between Bedford and Three Bridges although this service does not call at London Bridge.

Thameslink services at Purley are operated using Class 700 EMUs.

Preceding station	National Rail	Following station
South Croydon	Thameslink Brighton Main Line	Redhill
East Croydon	Southern Brighton Main Line	Coulsdon South
Purley Oaks	Southern Caterham Line	Kenley
Purley Oaks	Southern Tattenham Corner Line	Reedham
	Historical railways	
Purley Oaks	British Rail Southern Region Brighton Main Line	Coulsdon North

== Connections ==
Several London Buses routes serve the station.
