= Tattenham Corner railway station =

National Rail station in Surrey, England

Tattenham Corner
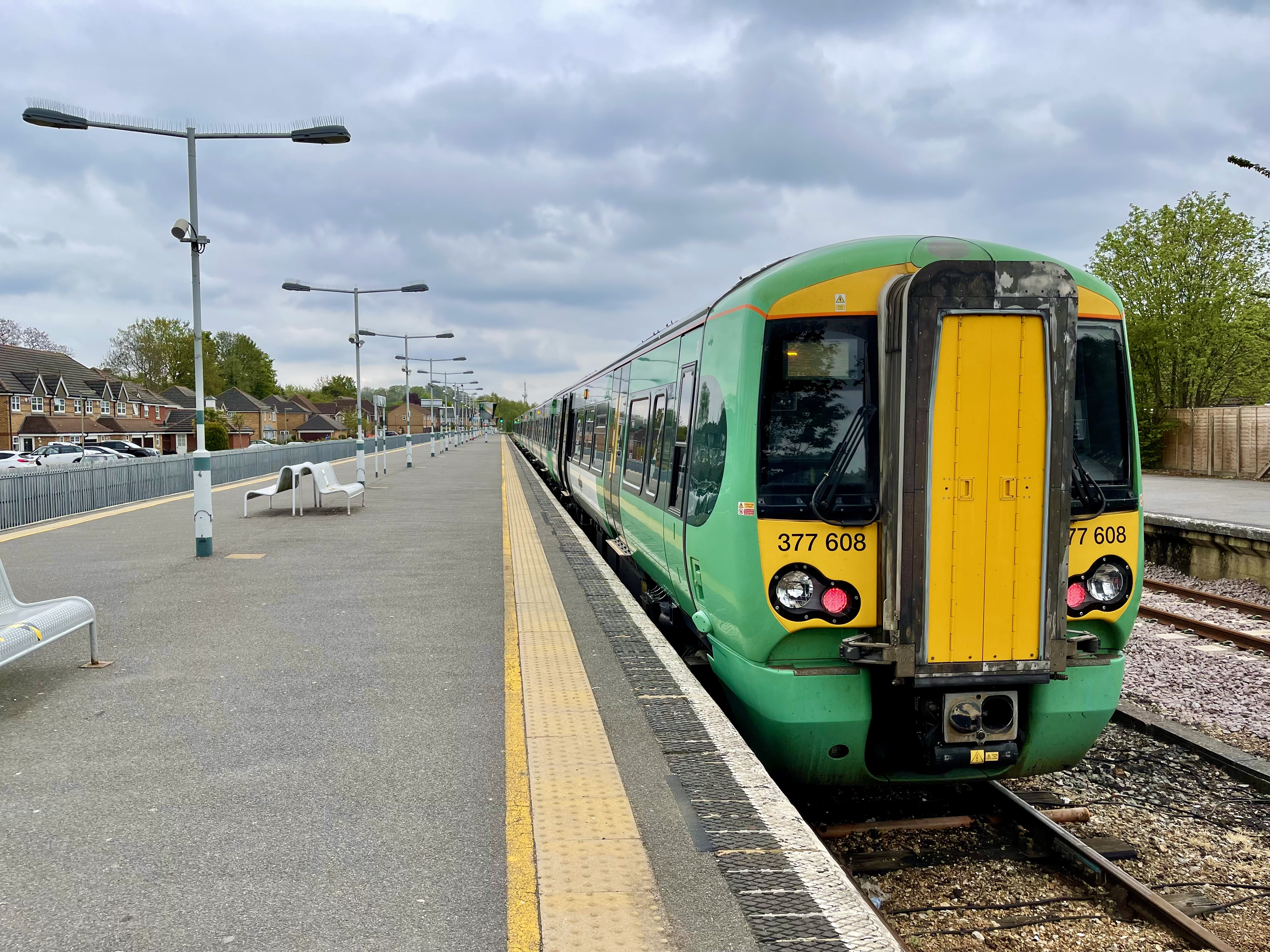
- Interactive map of Tattenham Corner

General information
- Location: Tattenham Corner
- Local authority: Borough of Reigate and Banstead
- Managed by: Southern
- Station code: TAT
- DfT category: E
- Number of platforms: 3
- Accessible: Yes
- Fare zone: 6

National Rail annual entry and exit
- 2020–21: ▼41,976
- 2021–22: ▲89,690
- 2022–23: ▲0.135 million
- 2023–24: ▼0.126 million
- 2024–25: ▲0.150 million

Railway companies
- Original company: South Eastern Railway
- Pre-grouping: South Eastern and Chatham Railway
- Post-grouping: Southern Railway

Key dates
- 4 June 1901: Opened
- September 1914: Closed
- 25 March 1928: Reopened

Other information
- External links: Departures; Facilities
- Coordinates: 51°18′33″N 0°14′33″W

Tattenham Corner railway station is in Surrey, in England. The station and all trains serving it are operated by Southern, and it is the terminus of the Tattenham Corner Line. It is 23 miles 37 chains (37.8 km) from London Charing Cross.

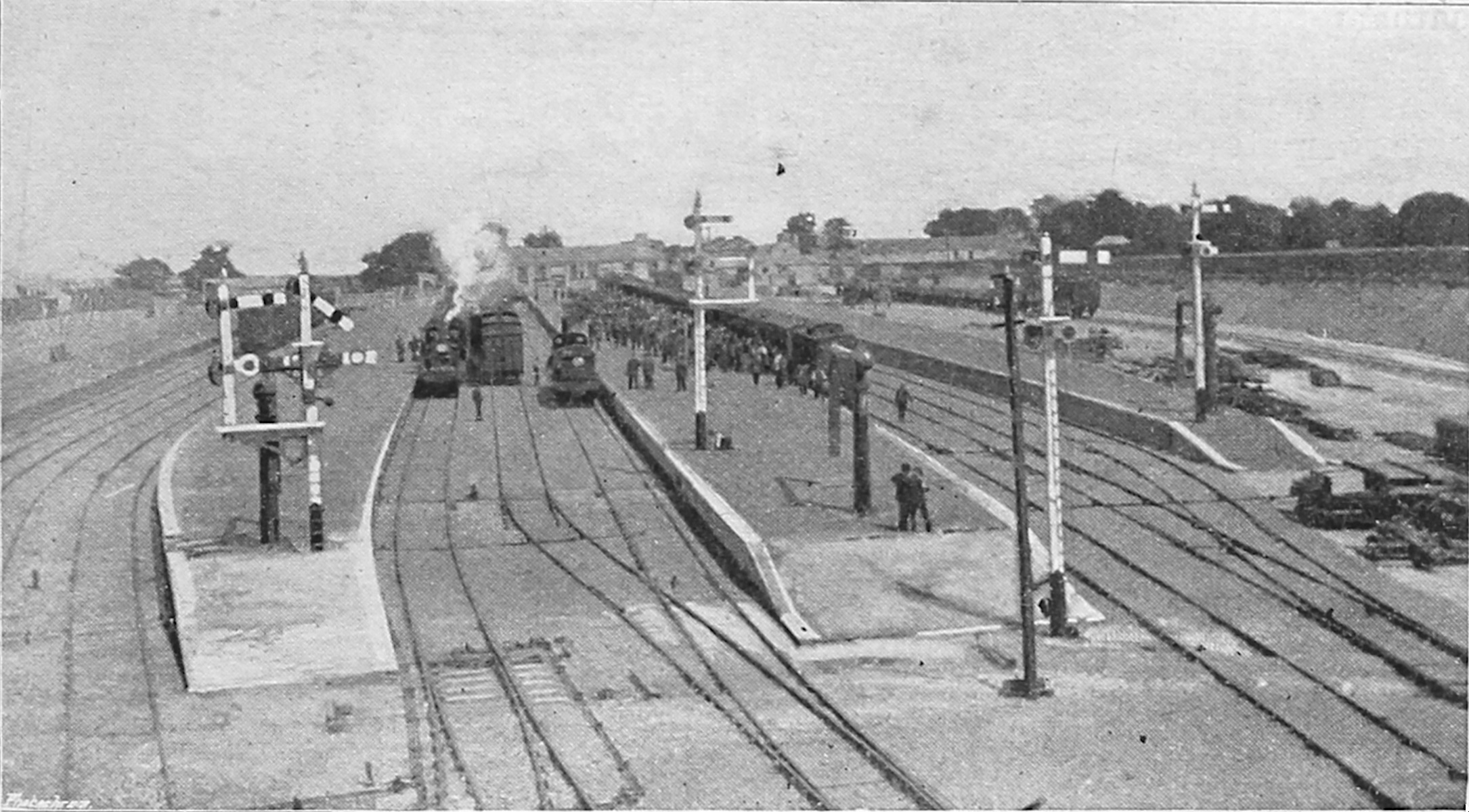
1901 view

It lies on the outskirts of Epsom and is the closest station for Epsom Downs Racecourse, where the Derby is held and the British monarch traditionally alights from the British Royal Train in those years when attending the Derby. The line serving it was opened (as the Chipstead Valley Railway) in stages between 1897 and 1901, with the commissioning of the final section coinciding with the opening of the station on 4 June that year (by which time the SER had absorbed the independent company). The station closed in September 1914 and was used occasionally for race specials from 1920 until full public service restored (upon electrification) on 25 March 1928. In its heyday, the station had seven platforms (to handle the sizeable amounts of racecourse traffic) but today only three remain.

Epsom Downs station is nearby as the terminus of the Epsom Downs branch line from Sutton, also served by Southern services.

== Accidents and incidents ==
On 1 December 1993, an approaching train (the 06.16 from Victoria) failed to brake in time to stop in the platform and overran the buffer stops; the leading vehicle ended up mounting the concourse and becoming embedded in the wooden station booking office (which subsequently had to be demolished). No passengers were injured in the crash, though the train driver and a member of station staff were hospitalised. The driver was later found to be intoxicated on duty and jailed for nine months.

== Services ==
All services at Tattenham Corner are operated by Southern, using Class 377 EMUs.

The typical off-peak service is two trains per hour to London Bridge, running non-stop from Norwood Junction.

On Sundays, that is reduced to an hourly shuttle service to Purley, where passengers for London Bridge have to change trains.

Preceding station	National Rail	Following station
Tadworth	Southern Tattenham Corner Line	Terminus

It was initially proposed that, from 2018, when the Thameslink Programme was completed, services on the line would be operated with larger 12-car trains, offering all-day direct services to Cambridge via London Blackfriars. However, in September 2016, those proposals were dropped and instead, services on the Tattenham Corner Line were to "remain as Southern South London Metro services with increased capacity as compared to today".
