= List of parks and open spaces managed by the City of London Corporation =

The City of London Corporation owns and maintains open space in and around Greater London.

They have mainly been acquired since 1878, when two Acts of Parliament entrusted the management of Epping Forest and several other areas within a 25-mile (40 km) radius to the corporation: these areas laid the foundation for the Green Belt in the 20th century. On dedicating the opening of Epping Forest on 6 May 1882, Queen Victoria said "It gives me the greatest satisfaction to dedicate this beautiful forest to the use and enjoyment of my people for all time."

== Within the City ==
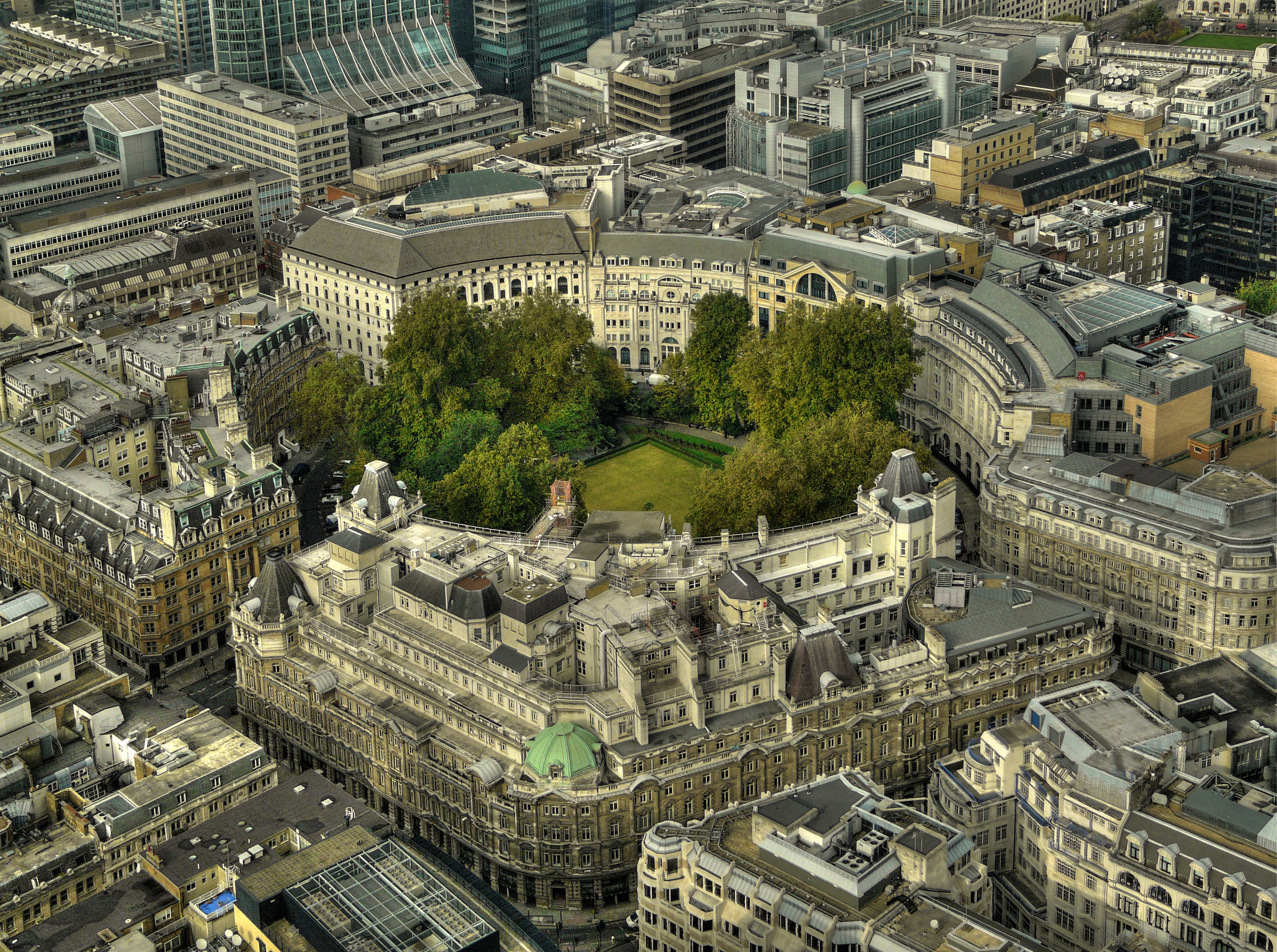
Finsbury Circus, the largest public open space, seen from Tower 42

The city has no sizeable parks within its boundary, but does have a network of a large number of gardens and small open spaces, many of them maintained by the corporation. These range from formal gardens such as the one in Finsbury Circus, to churchyards such as St Olave Hart Street, to water features and artwork in courtyards and pedestrianised lanes. There are 150 smaller areas within the square mile of the City of London, including:

- Barber-Surgeon's Hall Garden, London Wall
- Cleary Garden, Queen Victoria Street
- Churchyard at St Olave Hart Street
- Courtyard of St Vedast Foster Lane
- Finsbury Circus, Blomfield Street/London Wall/Moorgate
- Jubilee Garden, Houndsditch
- Portsoken Street Garden, Portsoken Street/Goodman's Yard
- Postman's Park, Little Britain
- Seething Lane Garden, Seething Lane
- St Dunstan-in-the-East, St Dunstan's Hill
- St Mary Aldermanbury, Aldermanbury
- St Olave Hart Street churchyard, Seething Lane
- St Paul's churchyard, St Paul's Cathedral
- West Smithfield Garden, West Smithfield
- Whittington Gardens, College Street

== Outside the City ==
The total managed area is 4,200 hectares (42 km^{2} (16 sq mi)). Included in the open spaces are:

- Hampstead Heath 274 hectares. Located in the boroughs of Camden and Barnet
- Epping Forest, 3,188 hectares. Largest public open space in the London area.
- Burnham Beeches, 218 hectares. An area in Buckinghamshire purchased 1880.
- Stoke Common, 83 hectares in Buckinghamshire.
- The City Commons, seven green spaces in South London and Surrey managed by the corporation:
  - Ashtead Common, 200 hectares
  - Farthing Downs, 95 hectares
  - Coulsdon Common, 51 hectares
  - Kenley Common, 56 hectares
  - Riddlesdown Common, 43 hectares
  - Spring Park, 20 hectares
  - West Wickham Common, 10 hectares
- Highgate Wood 28 hectares Purchased in 1886
- Queen's Park in northwest London, 12 hectares. Purchased 1886, having been the site of 1879 Royal Agricultural Exhibition
- West Ham Park, 31 hectares. Purchased 1874

It also has an interest in the Downlands Countryside Management Project in South-east London.
