= Merstham railway station =

Network Rail station in Surrey, England

Coordinates: 51.264°N 0.150°W

Merstham
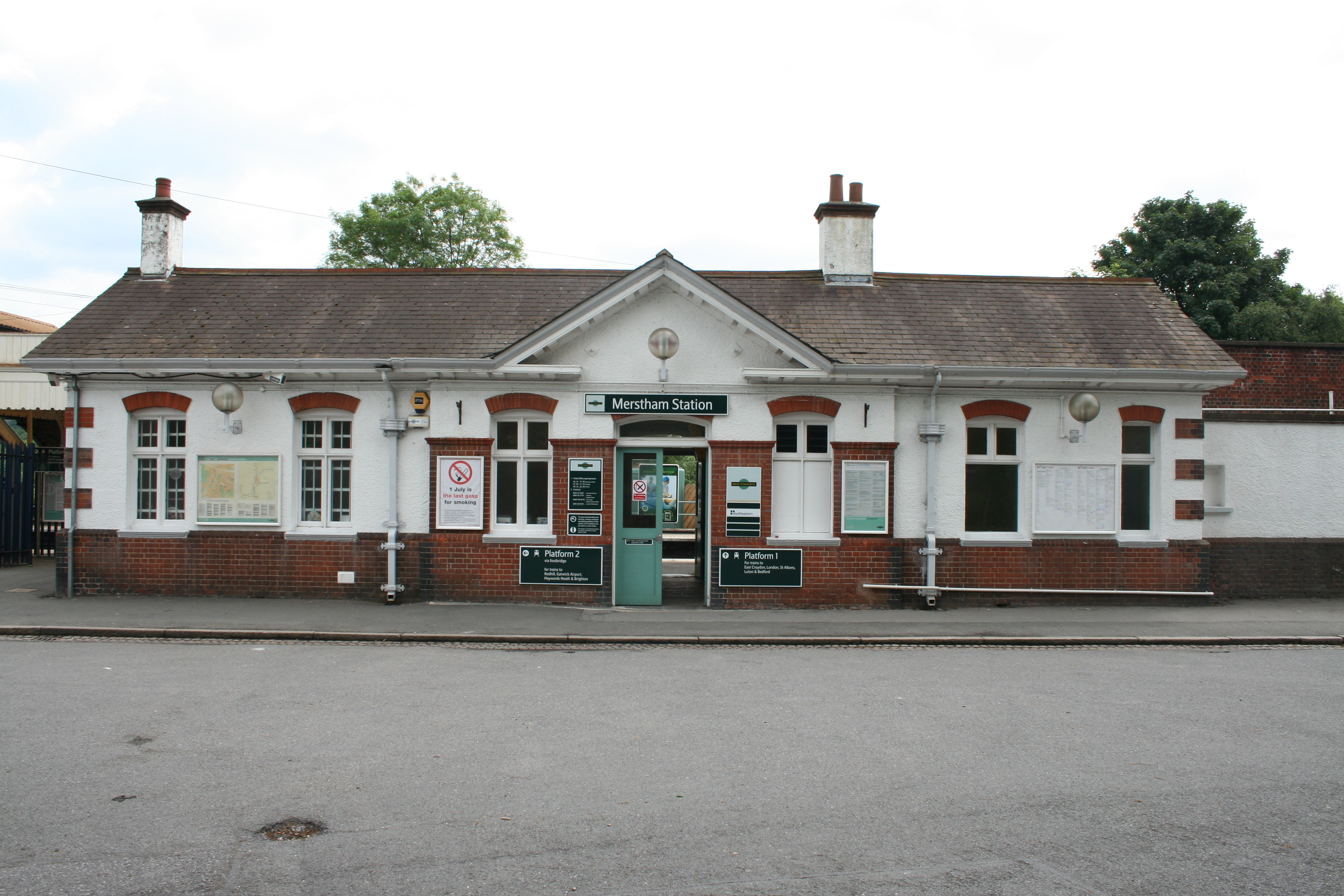
- Interactive map of Merstham

General information
- Location: Merstham
- Local authority: Reigate and Banstead
- Grid reference: TQ291532
- Managed by: Southern
- Station code: MHM
- DfT category: D
- Number of platforms: 2
- Accessible: Yes
- Fare zone: D

National Rail annual entry and exit
- 2020–21: ▼0.190 million
- 2021–22: ▲0.462 million
- 2022–23: ▲0.608 million
- 2023–24: ▲0.681 million
- 2024–25: ▲0.744 million

Key dates
- 1841: first station opened
- 1843: closed
- 1844: present station opened on different site from first station

Other information
- External links: Departures; Facilities

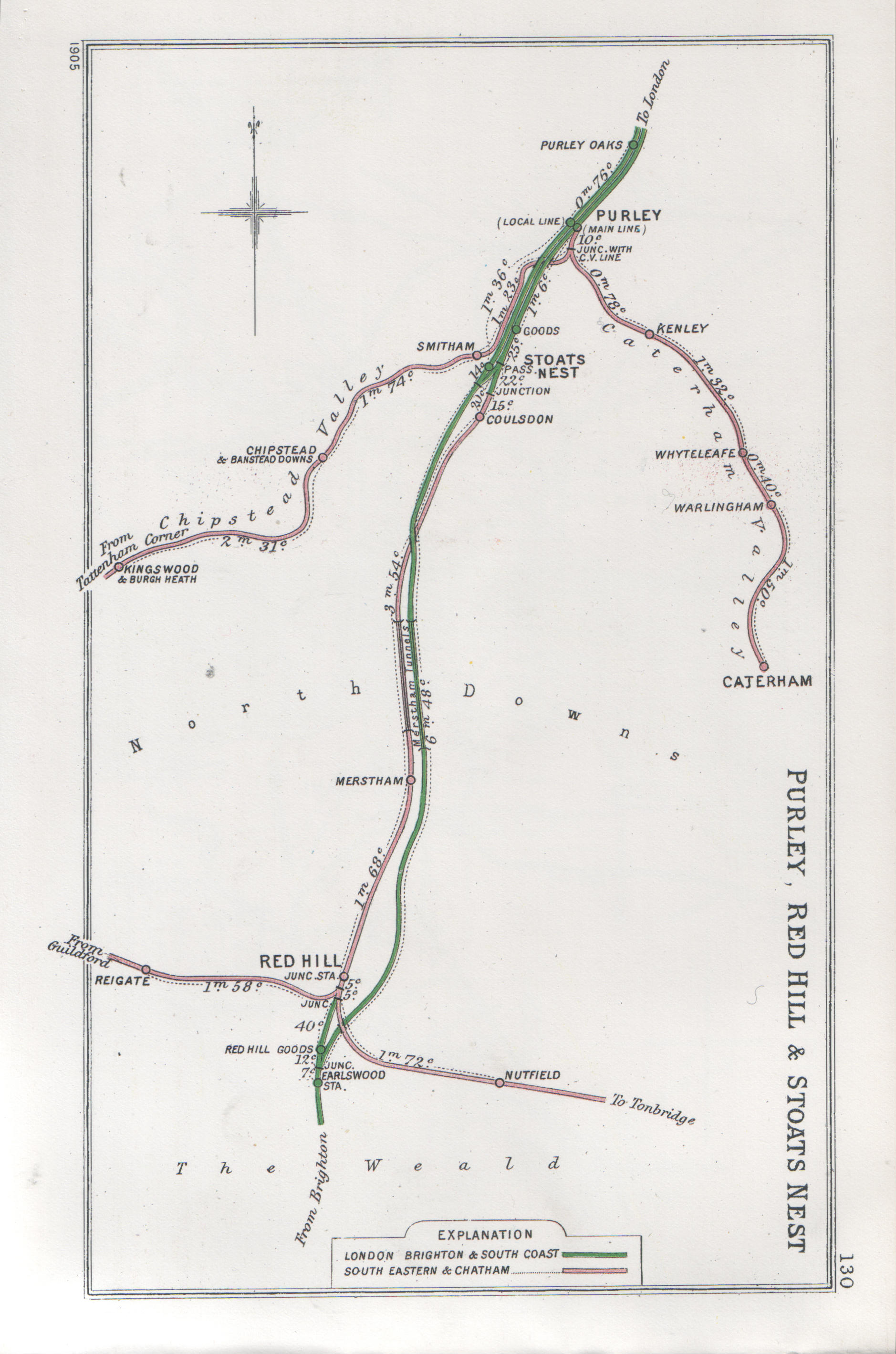
A 1905 Railway Clearing House map of lines around Merstham railway station.

Merstham railway station is in Merstham, Surrey, England. It is on the Brighton Main Line, 20 miles 59 chains (33.4 km) measured from London Charing Cross, and train services are currently provided by Southern, who manage the station, and Thameslink.

== History ==
Merstham was on a stretch of line between Croydon and Redhill which Parliament insisted should be shared by the London and Brighton Railway (L&BR) route to Brighton, and the South Eastern Railway (SER) route to Dover. As a result, there have been two railway stations at Merstham.

=== London and Brighton Railway station ===
The original station was located 3/4 mile south of the current station. It was opened by the L&BR on 1 December 1841, and from 1842 it was also used by SER and was the point at which travellers between the two railways exchanged trains. The section of line between Coulsdon and Redhill was transferred to SER operation, and the new owners decided to close Merstham station on 1 October 1843, thereby forcing passengers wishing to change trains to walk between the two stations at Redhill. This was a tactic to force the L&BR to share the new SER Reigate station at Redhill. Once the L&BR had given way and closed their existing station at Reigate Road, Redhill, the SER opened a new station at Merstham on the present site.

=== South Eastern Railway station ===
This station was opened 4 October 1844. The up side booking office (badly damaged by fire in the late 1980s and later rebuilt) and footbridge date from a 1905 rebuilding.

Despite being on the Brighton line, this station, along with Coulsdon South and Redhill, was owned by the South Eastern Railway (later South Eastern & Chatham Railway), and was not used by L&BR (later London Brighton and South Coast Railway trains. It was not until the creation of the Southern Railway in 1923 that trains from the Brighton line called at the station. It is 20 miles 59 chains (33.4 km) from Charing Cross, and has two platforms each long enough for a 12-coach train.

== Services ==
Services at Merstham are operated by Southern and Thameslink using Class 377 and 700 EMUs.

The typical off-peak service in trains per hour is:

- 2 tph to London Victoria
- 2 tph to Peterborough via London Bridge
- 2 tph to Reigate
- 2 tph to Horsham via Gatwick Airport

On Sundays, the service between London and Reigate reduces to hourly. In addition, the Peterborough to Horsham service also reduces to hourly and northbound, runs only as far as London Bridge.

Preceding station	National Rail	Following station
Coulsdon South	Southern Brighton Main Line	Redhill
Coulsdon South	Thameslink Peterborough to Horsham via Redhill	Redhill

== Oyster extension ==
As of January 2016, Oyster and contactless payment cards can be used from this station.
