= London Outer Orbital Path =

150-mile circular walk around London

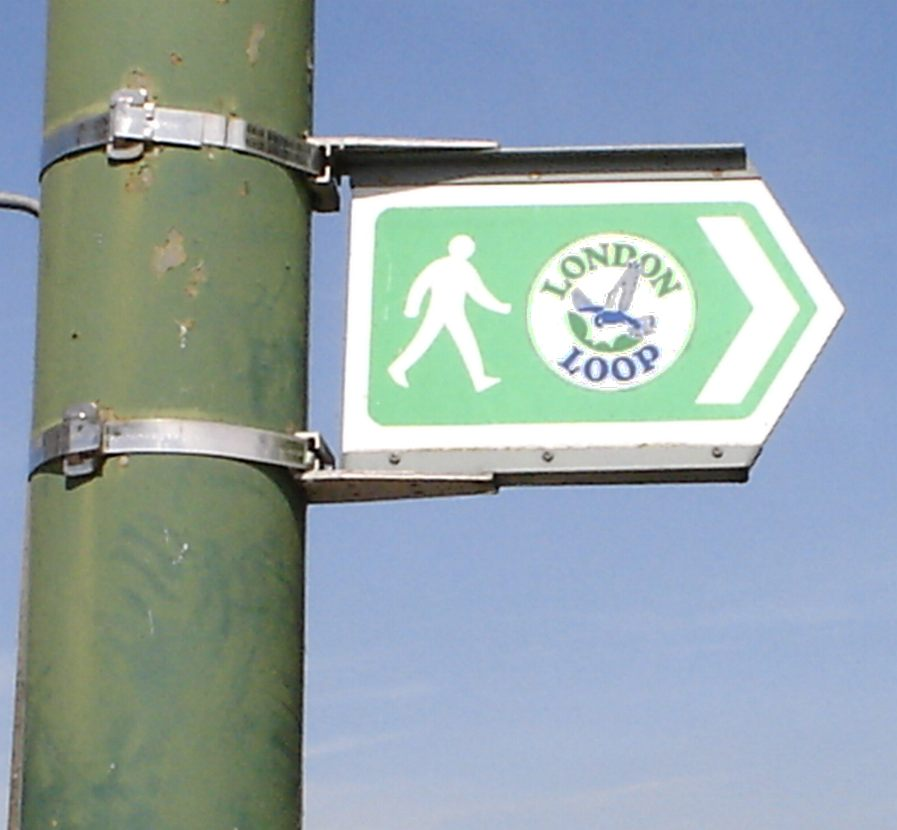
- The London LOOP's logo, a flying kestrel, can be seen on the signs marking the route
- Length: 150 mi (242 km)
- Location: London, England
- Trailheads: Circular
- Use: Hiking
- Season: All year

Trail map
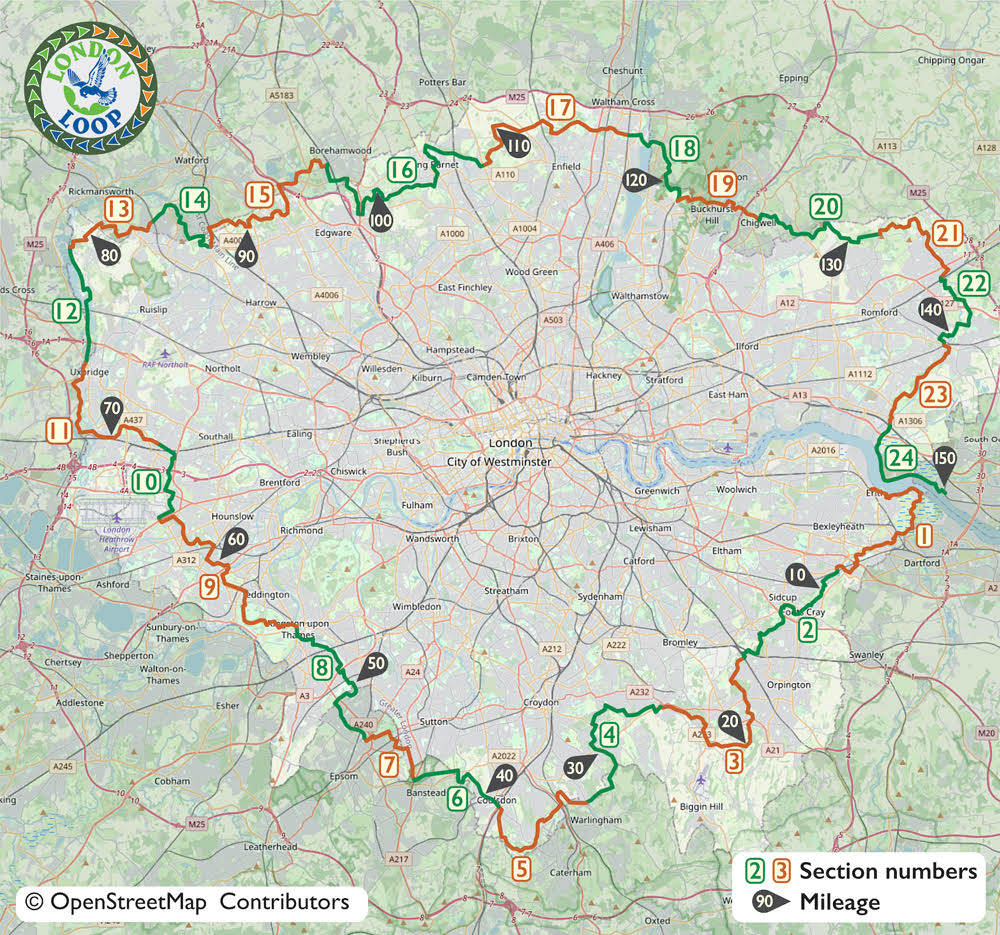

The London Outer Orbital Path—more usually the "London LOOP"—is a 150-mile (242 km) signed walk along public footpaths, and through parks, woods and fields around the edge of Outer London, England, described as "the M25 for walkers". The walk begins at Erith on the south bank of the River Thames and passes clockwise through Crayford, Petts Wood, Coulsdon, Banstead, Ewell, Kingston upon Thames, Uxbridge, Elstree, Cockfosters, Chingford, Chigwell, Grange Hill and Upminster Bridge before ending at Purfleet, almost directly across the Thames from its starting point. Between these settlements the route passes through green buffers and some of the highest points in Greater London.

== History ==
The walk was first proposed at a meeting between The Ramblers and the Countryside Commission in 1990. It was given an official launch at the House of Lords in 1993. The first section was opened on 3 May 1996, with a ceremony on Farthing Downs, Coulsdon. Other sections followed at the rate of two or three per year as signs were installed and leaflets for individual sections published, the route becoming fully walkable in 2001. Following the election of Ken Livingstone as Mayor of London, the London Loop became one of his key routes, along with its sister route, the Capital Ring.

== Route ==
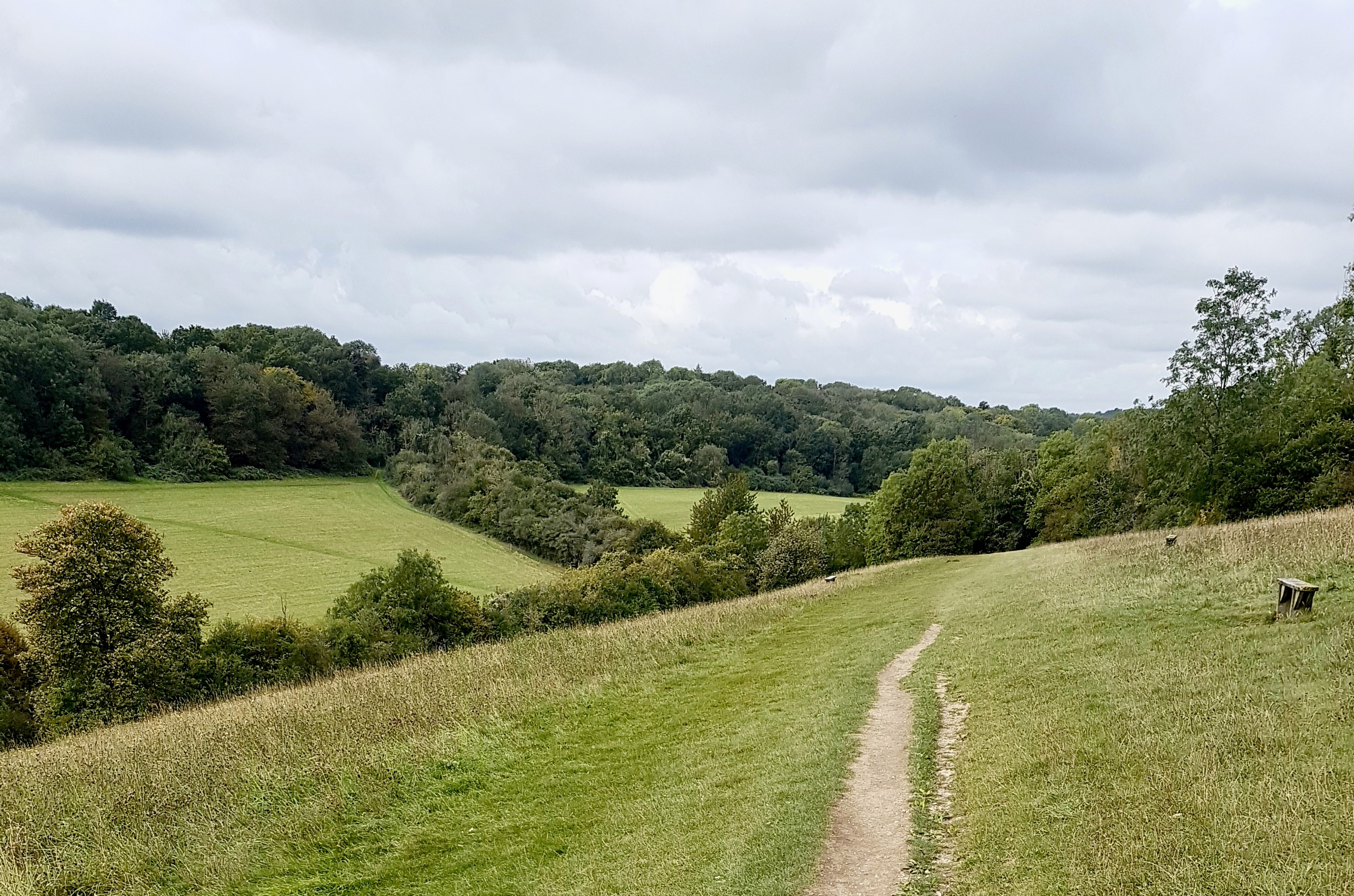
Happy Valley

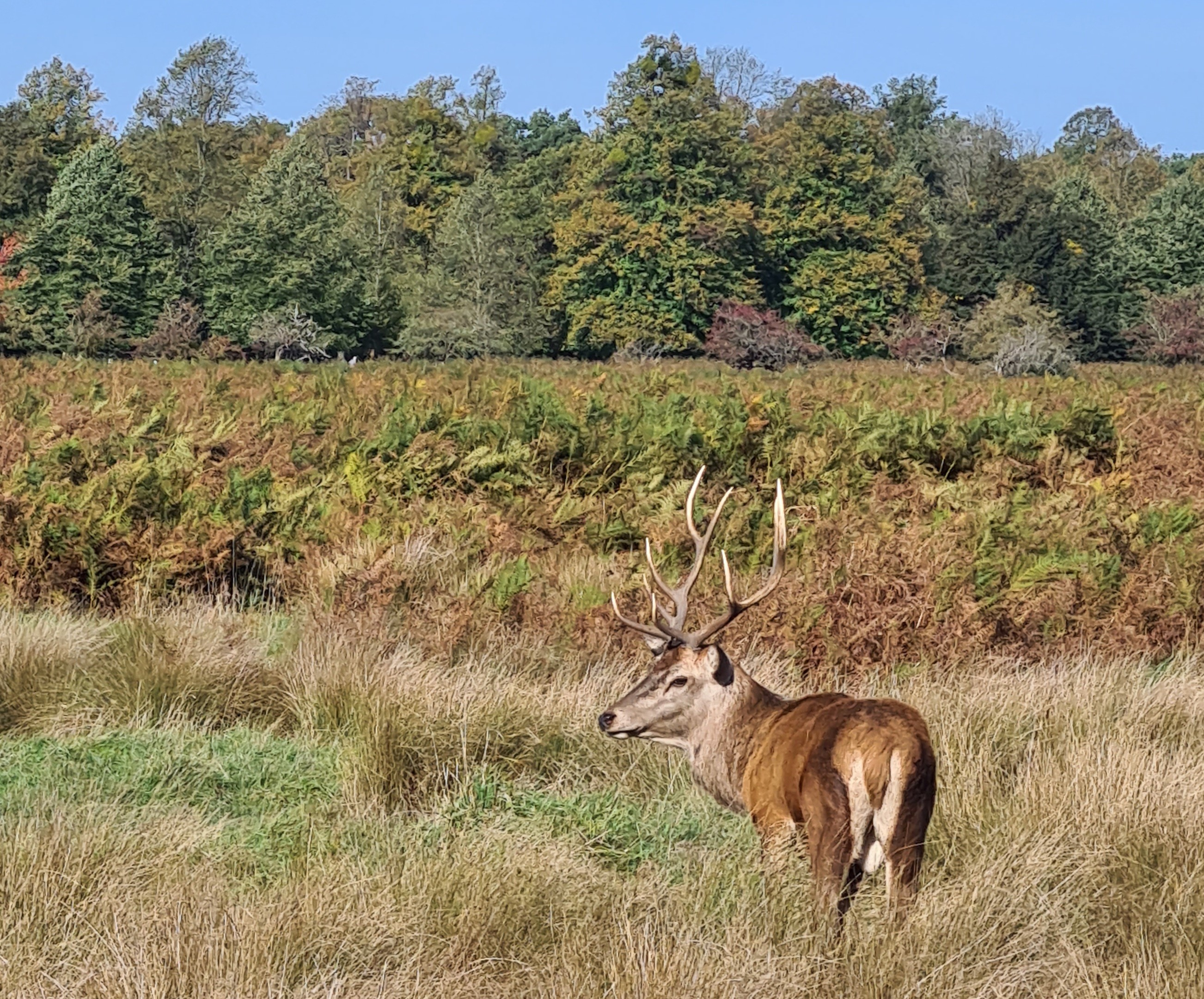
Stag in Bushy Park

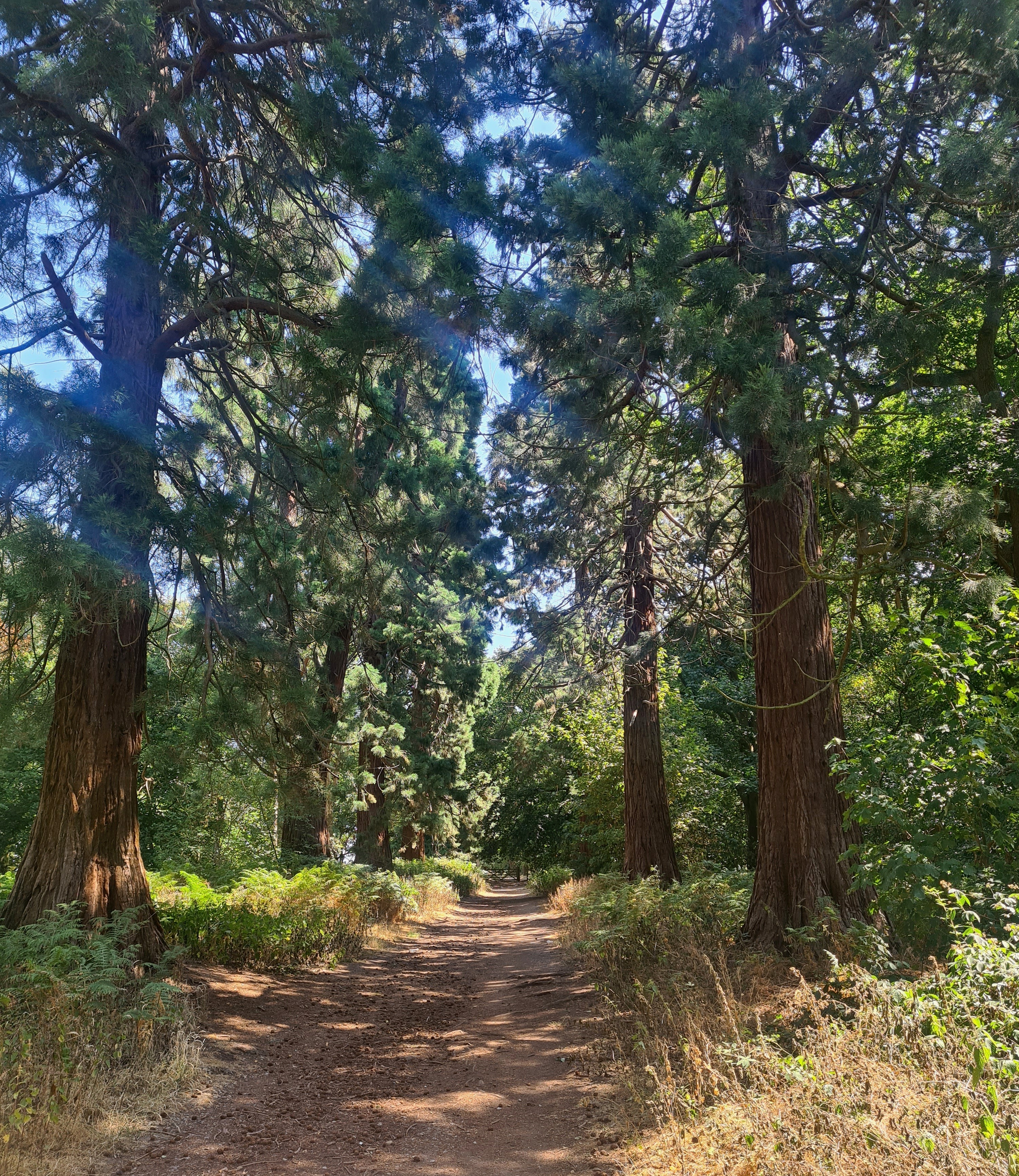
Wellingtonia Avenue

The route is divided into 24 sections in three groups: the "blue" group in South London, the "green" group in north-west London, and the "yellow" group in north-east London. The sections vary in length, from 3.8 miles (6.1 km) section 14 to 10 miles (16 km) section 16. Some sections start and/or end directly at public transport stops. However most sections have a further waymarked 'LOOP Link' to from their start and/or end to the nearest train or underground station. Additionally, there are waymarked 'LOOP Links' to train station midway along some sections. All these links are listed in the table below.

=== South London (sections 1–8) ===
The Loop officially begins by the River Thames in Erith. Points of interest in these sections south of the Thames include: Hall Place, the memorial to William Willett (advocate of summer time), the Wilberforce Oak, Shirley Windmill, Happy Valley, Farthing Downs, the Mayfield Lavender Farm and the Coronation Stone in Kingston.

=== North-west London (sections 9–16) ===
Having crossed the Thames at Kingston Bridge the Loop continues north of the river. Points of interest in these sections include: Bushy Park, the Shot Tower by the River Crane, the Grand Union Canal, the ancient woodland of Park Wood, Grim's Dyke and a cottage where David Livingstone once lived.

=== North-east London (sections 17–24) ===
Commencing at Cockfosters, the final third of the Loop heads south to its end at the Thames in Purfleet. Points of interest in these sections include: the New River, Forty Hall, Gilwell Park, Queen Elizabeth's Hunting Lodge in Epping Forest, the Wellingtonia Avenue in Havering Country Park, the valley of the River Ingrebourne, the Upminster Windmill, Hornchurch Country Park, the Concrete Barges by the Thames at Rainham and the RSPB Centre by the marshes at Purfleet.

Signposts, waymarks and information boards direct the walker along the route. In countryside locations the waymarks consist mostly of a simple white disc mounted on a wooden post, with a directional arrow and flying kestrel logo in blue and text in green. However, local authorities are responsible for funding these signs, so the quality varies from one borough to the next, with some sections not signed at all. The 54-mile (87 km) blue route from Erith to Kingston is maintained by the Downlands Countryside Management Project, a joint initiative by several councils, and is complete with signs and information boards, in addition to maps available from Tourist Information Centres.

There is no way to cross the river between Purfleet and Erith to complete the loop, although there was once a ferry to Erith which was mainly used by pilgrims on their way to Canterbury. In 2011 a proposal for a ferry to link the ends, and to link to riverbuses upstream at Woolwich, was shortlisted in the RIBA Forgotten Spaces competition.

The full route is also mapped on OpenStreetMap and available on the Go Jauntly app, in partnership with Transport for London.

Section	Description	Distance		Start coordinates	Public transport links		
Section	Description	mi	km	Start coordinates	Section start	Section end	Further signposted LOOP Links along the section
1	Erith to Old Bexley	8.5 mi	13.7 km	51.483144°N 0.177975°E	link from Erith station	link to Bexley station	Slade Green station Crayford station
2	Old Bexley to Petts Wood	7 mi	11 km	51.441233°N 0.148956°E	link from Bexley station	link to Petts Wood station	
3	Petts Wood to West Wickham Common	9 mi	14 km	51.393209°N 0.069081°E	link from Petts Wood station	link to Hayes station	
4	West Wickham Common to Hamsey Green	10 mi	16 km	51.370944°N 0.004860°E	link from Hayes station	Hamsey Green bus stop	
5	Hamsey Green to Coulsdon South	6 mi	9.7 km	51.319035°N 0.063420°W	Hamsey Green bus stop	Coulsdon South station	Whyteleafe station
6	Coulsdon South to Banstead Downs	4.5 mi	7.2 km	51.315728°N 0.136744°W	Coulsdon South station	link to Banstead station	
7	Banstead Downs to Ewell	3.5 mi	5.6 km	51.332148°N 0.209290°W	link from Banstead station	link to Ewell West station	
8	Ewell to Kingston Bridge	7.3 mi	11.7 km	51.351650°N 0.250176°W	link from Ewell West station	link to Kingston station	Malden Manor station
9	Kingston Bridge to Hatton Cross	8.5 mi	13.7 km	51.411854°N 0.308274°W	link from Kingston station	link to Hatton Cross underground station	Fulwell station
10	Hatton Cross to Hayes & Harlington	3.5 mi	5.6 km	51.469927°N 0.409793°W	link from Hatton Cross underground station	link to Hayes & Harlington station	
11	Hayes & Harlington to Uxbridge	7.5 mi	12.1 km	51.505117°N 0.418654°W	link from Hayes & Harlington station	link to Uxbridge underground station	West Drayton station
12	Uxbridge to Harefield West	4.5 mi	7.2 km	51.550933°N 0.483414°W	link from Uxbridge underground station	link to Hareford West / Belfry Avenue bus stop	
13	Harefield West to Moor Park	5 mi	8.0 km	51.610477°N 0.498761°W	link from Hareford West / Belfry Avenue bus stop	link to Moor Park underground station	
14	Moor Park to Hatch End	3.8 mi	6.1 km	51.623932°N 0.427529°W	link from Moor Park underground station	link to Hatch End station	
15	Hatch End to Elstree	10 mi	16 km	51.610702°N 0.380326°W	link from Hatch End station	link to Elstree & Borehamwood station	Stanmore underground station
16	Elstree to Cockfosters	10 mi	16 km	51.653365°N 0.281950°W	link from Elstree & Borehamwood station	short link to Cockfosters underground station	High Barnet underground station
17	Cockfosters to Enfield Lock	9.5 mi	15.3 km	51.652244°N 0.148998°W	short link from Cockfosters underground station	link to Enfield Lock station	Gordon Hill station
18	Enfield Lock to Chingford	4 mi	6.4 km	51.668264°N 0.028316°W	link from Enfield Lock station	link to Chingford station	
19	Chingford to Chigwell	4 mi	6.4 km	51.634306°N 0.012118°E	link from Chingford station	link to Chigwell underground station	
20	Chigwell to Havering-atte-Bower	6 mi	9.7 km	51.621468°N 0.078004°E	link from Chigwell underground station	short link to Havering Green bus stop	
21	Havering-atte Bower to Harold Wood	4.5 mi	7.2 km	51.616860°N 0.183245°E	short link from Havering Green bus stop	Harold Wood station	
22	Harold Wood to Upminster Bridge	4 mi	6.4 km	51.593421°N 0.234098°E	Harold Wood station	Upminster Bridge underground station	
23	Upminster Bridge to Rainham	4 mi	6.4 km	51.559197°N 0.236748°E	Upminster Bridge underground station	Rainham station	
24	Rainham to Purfleet	5 mi	8.0 km	51.516886°N 0.191433°E	Rainham station	link to Purfleet station	
