= Coulsdon =

Town in south London, England

Coordinates: 51.3211°N 0.1386°W

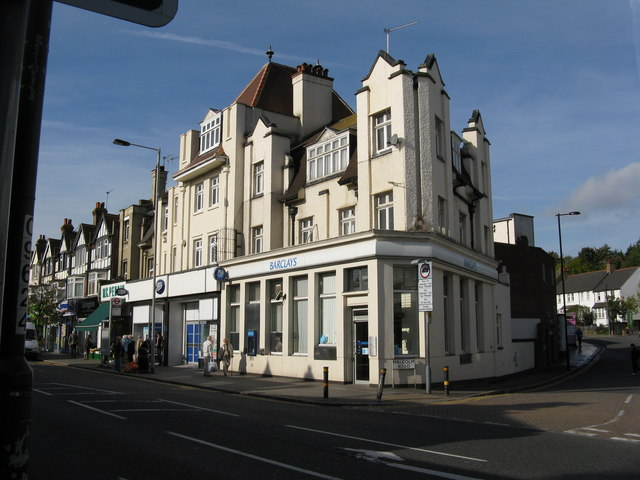
- Brighton Road

- Location within Greater London
- Population: 25,530 (2021 Census)
- OS grid reference: TQ3059
- London borough: Croydon
- Ceremonial county: Greater London
- Region: London
- Country: England
- Sovereign state: United Kingdom
- Post town: COULSDON
- Postcode district: CR5
- Dialling code: 020; 01737
- Police: Metropolitan
- Fire: London
- Ambulance: London
- UK Parliament: Croydon South
- London Assembly: Croydon and Sutton

Coulsdon (/ˈkuːlzdən/, traditionally pronounced /ˈkoʊlzdən/) is a town in south London, England, within the London Borough of Croydon. Coulsdon was an ancient parish in the county of Surrey that included the settlements of Purley and Kenley. It was merged with Sanderstead in 1915 to form the Coulsdon and Purley Urban District and has formed part of Greater London since 1965.

== History ==
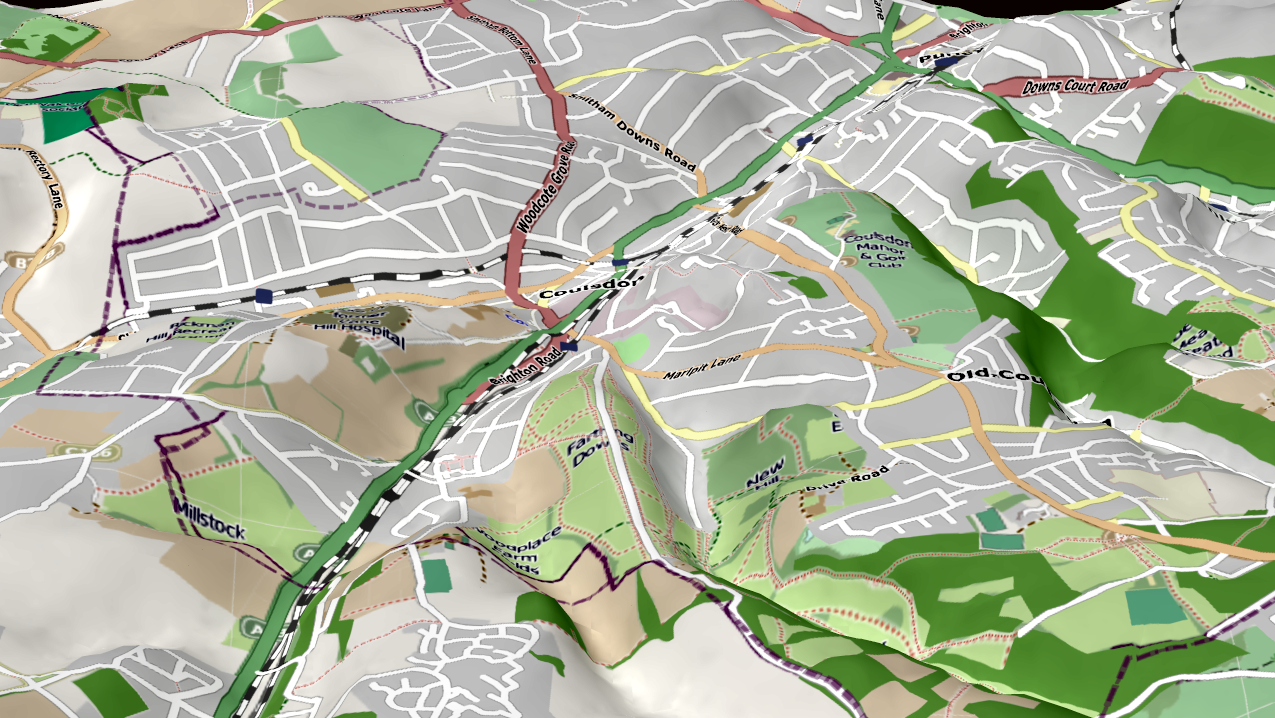
A topological view of Coulsdon, showing the various hill and valleys.

The location forms part of the North Downs. The hills contain chalk and flint. A few dry valleys with natural underground drainage merge and connect to the main headwater of the River Wandle, as a winterbourne (stream), so commonly called "the Bourne". Although this breaks onto the level of a few streets when the water table is exceptionally high, the soil is generally dry. The depression and wind gap was a natural route across the Downs for early populations.

Fossil records exist from the Pleistocene period (about 4,000,000 years ago).

There is evidence of human occupation from the Neolithic period, Iron Age, Anglo-Saxon, Bronze Age, Roman and Medieval. In 675, Frithwald, an Ealdorman and viceroy of King Wulfhere of Mercia, gave land at Cuthraedesdune to Chertsey Abbey. It appears as Colesdone in the Domesday Book. In 1537, the dissolution of the monasteries passed ownership to the King.

In 1545, Henry VIII granted two homes with land in Whattingdon and Coulsdon, Welcombes and Lawrences, to Sir John Gresham, the manor having been owned by Chertsey Abbey in the 8th century, when it was recorded as Whatindone.

The Coulsdon Manor was granted or sold in 1553 to various families, including Sir Nicholas Carew (1553), Sir Francis Carew (1557), Jerome Weston, 2nd Earl of Portland, Sir Richard Mason, Sir Edward Darcy, Sir Robert Darcy and Sir Edward Bouverie (see Earl of Radnor).

From 1782 to 1921, it was owned by three generations of the Byron family, who had already purchased the sub-manor of Hooley.

In 1801, the Byron family moved to live at Hooley House. Then, having sold a large amount of land in 1838 to the 'London to Brighton railway company', they moved from Hooley House to Portnall's Farm.

In 1850, Hartley Farm was demolished and Coulsdon Court was built by Thomas Byron. It was said to have been constructed of the last bricks to be made locally at Crossways (at Coulsdon Road, Old Coulsdon). In 1854, to avoid the court, he adjusted the paths of some local roads, and created a gated drive from the public road.

In 1863, Edmund Byron inherited the title. After his use of the inclosure acts was curtailed when he lost a case in 1877 at the Court of Chancery, large areas were sold in 1883 to the Corporation of London. The importance of this event was reported in The Times. He also sold and gave away various plots.

In 1921, Edmund Byron died. The remaining lands owned by the Byrons were sold. Land and manorial rights were passed to the Coulsdon and Purley Urban District Council.

For many centuries, the lands contained several farms and manors and only on the coming of the railway were a few wealthy people from outside the traditional borders attracted to build grand houses, by 19th century descriptions, such as:

This parish, which is situated on the road from London to Brighton, occupies an elevated position, and commands extensive and varied prospects.

— S. Lewis, A Topographical Dictionary of England, 1848

Until 1921, the Byron family had largely maintained this tradition, despite sales of earlier land. The sales in the 1860s increased the number of landowners. Most housing in Smitham (Bottom/Valley) and the clustered settlement of Old Coulsdon, as well as the narrower valley between them, was built in the 80 years from 1890 to 1970. The area developed mixed suburban, and in its centre urban, housing:

The whole aspect of the parish has been completely transformed during the last twenty years by building. It was a little while ago entirely rural with a few new houses scattered along the line of the railway and up the valley towards Caterham, whence another deep depression in the chalk runs down to Smitham Bottom. Now there are continuous rows of villas and cottages and shops from Croydon to south of Coulsdon station.

— Victoria County History, vol. 4, 1912

The valley and routes in Smitham Bottom encouraged some early settlements. An inn, the Red Lion, appears on the Bainbridge map of 1783. The coming of the railway and improved road links encouraged buildings along the sides of the major roadways and close to the stations. Since 1921, the sales of the old estate lands have replaced a countryside of discrete farms with thousands of suburban dwellings.

Coulsdon segregated its long-haul from its local traffic with the construction of the Farthing Way A23 bypass, which opened in December 2006 as part of the Coulsdon Town Centre Improvement Scheme.

== Quarrying ==
The Hall family had been active in the Croydon area as coal and lime merchants since the 18th. In 1853 they leased an area of land in Coulsdon. In 1864 they closed their quarries at Merstham and increased their quarrying for chalk and flints and use of lime kilns in Coulsdon.

This quarry at Coulsdon (Marlpit Lane) was named the 'Stoats Nest Quarry'. The works had its own internal railway system which connected to nearby main lines.

In 1898, the Hall family were refused permission (by their landlord) to build cement works on the Coulsdon site.

The lime principally supplied for waterworks, gas works and tanneries. Demand reduced in 1902 when the Army changed from leather to webbing equipment. And in 1905 there was no longer demand from the gasworks.

Between 1905 and 1910 chalk was supplied for the Halls' cement works at Beddington. In 1905, 13,000 tons of chalk were sent by rail from Coulsdon. By 1918, it was processing lime for use as fertilizer.

In 1920, the Hall company purchased 102 acres from their landlord, Byron. This offered their full benefit of the railways and kilns on the land.

Halls maintained a trading depot in the Marlpit Lane quarry from 1923. It was named the "Ullswater trading estate". The limeworks closed in 1961, and a park now lies in its place.

== Toponymy ==
The town's spelling, pronunciation and location have changed. Coulsdon originally referred to the area now known as Old Coulsdon.

The name derives from Cuðrædsdun via Cullesdone pre-1130, Culesdone pre-1190, Cullisdon 1242, Culesdene 1255, Colendone c1270, Kulisdon 1279, Collesdon 1288, Cullesdon 1323, Colleston 1324, Coulesdon 1346, Cullysdon 1377, Colynsdon 1428, Colysdon 1439, Collysdon 1563, Cowlesdon 1557, Coulsdon 1597, Cowisden 1604, Couldisdon 1610, Couldesdon 1675, Culsdon 1678, Colsdon 1724.

Additional variations include Curedesdone 675, Cudredesdone 675, Cudredesdune 967, Coulsdon 1083, Colesdone 1085, Culesdon 1234, Culisdon 1242, Cudredestreow 1251, Cullesdon 1266, Colesdene 1287, Colesdon 1290, Colesdun 1290, Culesdon 1291, Culesden 1292, Colieston 1324, Coulesden 1326, Coueleston 1332, Colisdon 1344, Culeston 1346, Cullysdon 1377, Cullisdoun 1403, Cullesdoun 1422, Culledon 1424, Colynsdon 1428, Collesdon 1439, Culsdon 1446, Cowlesdon 1539, Collesden 1544, Cowlesdowne 1553, Cullesdoy 1556, Colsdon 1558, Cowlesden 1558, Cullesden 1558, Cowllysdon 1567, Cowisden 1618, Coulsden 1619, Cowsdon 1620, Coolsden 1650, Coulesden 1650, Coilsoun 1655, Coulden 1655.

The widely accepted origin of the name is ‘hill of a man called Cūthrǣd’, (from OE pers. name + dūn, a hill). Alternatively the name originates from the Celtic or primitive Welsh "cull", meaning a leather bag, scrotum, bosom, womb or belly.

The current town centre appears as Leydown Cross (1738) or Leaden Cross (1800) and Smitham Bottom. In 1905, the parish council, and then the Post Office renamed "Smitham bottom" as "Coulsdon". The name "Smitham Bottom" has also changed. Smetheden (1331), Smithdenbottom (1536), Smythedean(e)(1548), Smythden Bottom (1588), Smitham Bottom (1719)

== Local government ==
Coulsdon was an ancient parish in the county of Surrey that included the settlements of Purley and Kenley. In 1894 it became part of Croydon Rural District. The population of the parish had almost doubled between 1901 and 1911. In 1915 the rural district was split up and Coulsdon along with Sanderstead became part of the Coulsdon and Purley Urban District. On 1 April 1965 the civil parish was abolished and Coulsdon and Purley became part of the London Borough of Croydon in Greater London. At the 1951 census (one of the last before the abolition of the parish), Coulsdon had a population of 42,753.

== Localities ==
Coulsdon is a largely suburban district of London. The central area has substantial industrial, automotive and distribution services. It is served by standard retail and social facilities, as well as a library and local professions of a typical town in the country. The alternate centre, Old Coulsdon, has a recreation ground/cricket pitch-focused village green, a small parade of shops and a medieval church.

=== Old Coulsdon ===
Old Coulsdon occupies the south-east of the district. Scattered, rather than clustered, are six buildings listed for their national heritage and architectural value, at Grade II. Two categories above this, in the highest class, Grade I, is the Church of St John the Evangelist. This is by the recreation ground, shortly after Marlpit Lane has been joined by Coulsdon Road, from the north. St John's is late thirteenth century with extensive later additions, made of flint and rubble with much brick patching. Its nave spans two (window) bays. Older still is its "good" chancel of 1250 with stepped sedilia and piscina. The west tower above the entrance is of circa 1400 with corner buttresses and a tapering broach spire. A nave at right angles, replacing the south aisle, in decorated style, was designed for its 1958 construction by J. B. S. Comper.

=== Coulsdon (Formerly Smitham Bottom or Smitham) ===
In the early 19th century, the present-day location of Coulsdon was occupied by a coaching inn called the Red Lion and its associated green (Lion Green), but few other buildings. Smitham Bottom was a geographical feature in the form of a chalk valley running between the Red Lion and Purley. The coach route between London and Brighton ran through this depression and, in 1841, the London and Brighton Railway completed construction of a railway along it.

With the arrival of Coulsdon (now Coulsdon South) railway station in 1889 and the commencement of work on the Cane Hill asylum, accommodation near the site was required by workers and residential development started in the area. The village initially took the name of Smitham Bottom or Smitham. The population expanded and soon overtook that of the original settlement to the south-east. Despite strong opposition from local residents the village of Smitham Bottom was officially renamed Coulsdon by the GPO, while the older village became Old Coulsdon. The former site of the Red Lion inn is currently occupied by an Aldi store.

Most retail and commerce is set beside the Brighton Road which, until 2006, also carried the A23, a major route from London to Brighton. Since 2006 the A23 bypasses the town centre and runs along the Coulsdon relief road (Farthing Way).

The soil is dry, and water was obtained even in 1912 by deep wells here in the chalk. This dry valley in the chalk has a watercourse below, the water of which until the 16th century occasionally in times of flood ran here but after this, inexplicably, waits to break out as far as at the foot of the chalk in Croydon and Beddington.

Coulsdon has two railway stations, Coulsdon South and Coulsdon Town.

=== The Marlpit business and industrial estate ===
Marlpit (a former chalk quarry) is the town's Marlpit Industrial / Business Park estate, which is strong in storage, distribution and technology.

=== The Mount or Clockhouse ===
The Clockhouse Estate is a square neighbourhood on a hill plateau north of Coulsdon. It was begun in 1934 but the bulk of its development by Carshalton Urban District Council took place after the Second World War with blocks of flats built in the 1950s and 1960s. It is also known as The Mount after the central street. It is located in a cut-off corner of the London Borough of Sutton, being only accessible by road through the London Borough of Croydon.

The London Loop Section 6 runs along its eastern edge, continuing to the Banstead Downs and East Ewell to Nonsuch Palace 4 miles (6.4 km) north-west.

=== Coulsdon Woods ===
The Coulsdon Woods estate lies on the hillside between Byron Avenue and the railway. It was built by Wates, with construction commencing in 1967.

=== Cane Hill ===
This area forms the area of the former buildings and grounds of Cane Hill Hospital; there had been proposals to expand this again in the late 1990s, but these were delayed and then cancelled.

An approved development of the former site of Cane Hill Hospital by Barratt Developments and David Wilson Homes, an associated organisation, gained planning permission, and started in about 2015, with intent to create over six hundred new dwellings. In 2013, Barratt published a Public Consultation document and report of feedback. Some residents protested concerns relating to the likely effect on local infrastructure, including access routes, the proposed mix of housing, transport, notably road traffic, and the provision of educational services.

In 2016 planning application approvals were finalised and the development of 677 homes on the 210-acre site was later completed in November, 2021.

== Open spaces ==
In 1883, to prevent further loss of common lands arising from the inclosure acts, the Corporation of London (under provisions of the Corporation of London (Open Spaces) Act 1878), purchased from Squire Byron (Lord of the Manor of Coulsdon) Farthing Downs, Coulsdon Common and Kenley Common, to add to the earlier purchase of Riddlesdown Common. The London Borough of Croydon own and maintain several parks, including Happy Valley, which, together with Farthing Downs, is designated is a Site of Special Scientific Interest.

Rickman Hill Park is the highest public park in London, at 155 metres above sea level.

A memorial park and recreation ground was purchased from the Byrons by Coulsdon and Purley Urban District Council and Hall & Co Ltd in 1920, it was opened in 1921.

The London Loop footpath passes through Happy Valley and Farthing Downs between Hamsey Green and Banstead. The Coulsdon section was the first of the 24 to be opened.

Grange Park was obtained partly by Public Subscription but mostly by Coulsdon and Purley Urban District Council in 1929 from the owners of the Coulsdon Court Golf Course. The land was sold for use as an open space or pleasure and recreation ground. Grange Park was formerly part of Squire Byrons Coulsdon Court Estate. Grange Park is situated in a designated conservation area in the heart of Old Coulsdon and incorporates a children's play area and recreational green space. In total, Grange Park represents local green space of around 8 acres.

== Places of religious interest ==
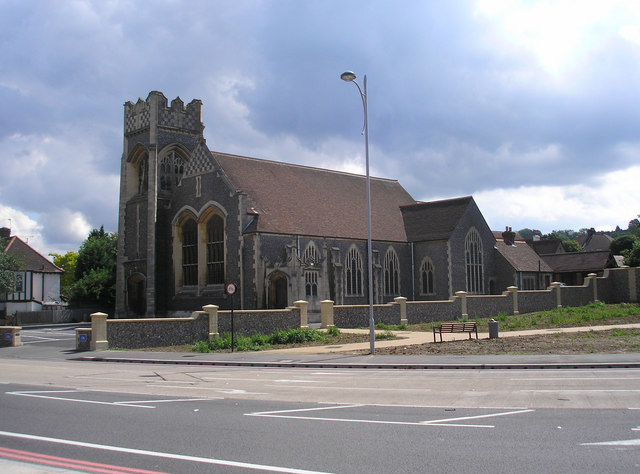
Methodist Church, Coulsdon

Places of worship include:

- St Mary and St Shenouda Coptic Orthodox Church, which was visited by the then Coptic Pope in 2017.
- St Andrew's Anglican church. From 1914.
- St Aidan's Roman Catholic church from 1964.
- The Brighton Road Methodist church. From 1911.
- Beit Hallel Messianic Synagogue
- St John's Anglican church (Old Coulsdon)
- St Mary's Roman Catholic church (Old Coulsdon)
- Old Coulsdon Congregational Church
- Kingdom Hall of Jehovah's Witnesses

== Leisure ==
Athletics: The Old Coulsdon Hash House Harriers (or "OCH3") is a local hashing group.

Gordon Pirie (1931–1991), an English long-distance runner lived in Coulsdon and was a member of South London Harriers, one of the oldest and most successful athletics club in Britain. The club has been based in Coulsdon since 1913, and remains there to this day. The club competes in cross-country, road running and track and field events, and trains from its Coulsdon HQ three times a week. The club has been heavily involved in recent years in building an eight lane all weather running track at Woodcote School. It also has an active and successful triathlon section.

Bare-knuckle boxing fights were held at Smitham Bottom. Records exist of fights in 1788 and 1792.

Bowls has been played at the Marlpit Lane Recreation Ground since the 1920s. A separate team played at the Ashdown Park Hotel.

Chess has been played from 1949.

Old Coulsdon had one of the first cricket clubs in the world, founded in 1762. It was one of the strongest teams in the country in the late 18th and early 19th century and once boasted eight England internationals, as well as a young Stuart Surridge. The club was possibly the first to use three stumps and two bails and frequently played matches on the most famous early cricket grounds such as Mitcham, and later in Grange Park in the village. In 1995 falling player numbers forced the club to merge with the nearby Redhill Cricket Club, playing at the Ring on Earlswood Common in the Earlswood neighbourhood of Redhill as Redhill & Old Coulsdon Cricket Club. Cricket was originally played at 'Smitham Bottom' opposite the Red Lion. The first archived results come from a games was played in 1731 (Surrey vs East Grinstead). A 'Cricket Shed' appears in Smitham Bottom as a fixed building in a map of 1785. In the 1880s, this area became was built over, and the club moved to Old Coulsdon. From the 1920s, cricket was played at The Memorial Gardens.

A cycling group meets at the Temperance Hotel.

Coulsdon United Football Club participated in the Combined Counties League .

Golf is played at Woodcote Park Golf Club (since 1920) and at Coulsdon Manor. Green bowls is available next door. Ashdown Park Golf Club (now defunct) was founded in 1912. The club did not appear following WW1.

Horse riding is available on the downs. Coulsdon has wide and long pavements and indoor cafés from which to watch any of the London-Brighton rallies (vintage cars, minis, Land Rovers, vintage commercial vehicles, motorbikes, cycling etc.).

Hunting meetings of the Old Surrey Foxhounds were held at the Red Lion from 1735 until 1908. In 1915, the hunt merged with Old Surrey Burstow and West Kent Hunt.

Rugby Union: Purley John Fisher Rugby Football Club at Parsons Pightle, Old Coulsdon. Chipstead Rugby CLub play locally at The Meads, Chipstead, offering mini, youth, adult social and adult league rugby.

The Coulsdon Martial Arts Club] (also known as Yoshin Ryu) is long established. Yoshin Ryu was originally started in the late seventies as a collection of clubs based in youth centres and sports halls around the Croydon area. Coulsdon Martial Arts is on the site of what was originally a 'tin' church built by the Roman Catholic Church in 1916. The church building located on this site was purchased in the mid-1990s.

Theatre Workshop Coulsdon branched out of the Croydon Youth Theatre Organisation in 1970. It is based at the Coulsdon Community Centre on Chipstead Valley Road.

The Memorial Gardens has an adventure park, crazy golf, basketball, tennis, cricket and, in the summer, 'beach games' and events organised by the café.

Grange Park in Old Coulsdon has a playground, and football pitches. Rickman Hill Park hosts football, and has a children's playground and tennis courts.

== Demography ==
The 2021 United Kingdom Census recorded that the two wards: Coulsdon Town (ward) and Old Coulsdon (ward), contained respectively: 15,419 people living in 5,724 homes and 10,109 people living in 3,951 homes. The percentage of the population who declared their health as very good was 55% and 51% respectively. Ethnic makeup was as follows:

Ethnic Group	Coulsdon Town Ward	Old Coulsdon Ward
Asian, Asian British or Asian Welsh	15.6%	7.6%
Black, Black British, Black Welsh, Caribbean or African	10.4%	7.5%
Mixed or Multiple ethnic groups	6.5%	6.7%
White	65.2%	76.9%
Other ethnic group	2.3%	1.3%

== Education ==
- Chipstead Valley Primary School
- Coulsdon Church of England Primary School
- Coulsdon Sixth Form College
- Keston Primary School
- The Lodge
- Oasis Academy Byron
- Oasis Academy Coulsdon formerly known as Coulsdon High and before that as Taunton Manor.
- Smitham Primary School and Nursery
- St. Aidan's R.C. Primary School
- Woodcote High School
- Woodcote Primary School

== Nearest places ==
- Banstead
- Carshalton
- Caterham
- Croydon
- Kenley
- Old Coulsdon
- Purley
- Reedham
- South Croydon
- Wallington

== Railway ==
1804. The Surrey Iron Railway was enhanced by the "Coulsdon Merstham & Godstone Railway". These were horsedrawn railways which carried quarried materials and crops from Coulsdon and Merstham, and returned with fuel, metals and other materials. To maintain a regular elevation at Coulsdon required large changes in direction and the construction of 20 ft embankments and a road bridge. Remnants of the 1805 railway embankment are still evident. The railway closed in 1838 due to underuse. A bridge over the Chipstead Valley road was demolished as dangerous in 1854.

1841. The London & Brighton Railway line opened.

1856. The Caterham railway opened. Initially intended to serve residents of Old Coulsdon, a station named 'Coulsdon' opened; later to be renamed 'Kenley'.

1893. Authorisation was given for a new (second) line to be built between Purley and Kingwood. This was the Chipstead Valley Railway which was later extended to become the Tattenham Corner line. Constructed by the South Eastern Railway in 1896, it opened in 1897 as a single-track line.

1900. The main line between Croydon and Coulsdon was widened. A new (third) line was added named the Quarry Line between Coulsdon North and Earlswood (bypassing Redhill). Constructed 1898–9. The line involved engineering work including cuttings, embankments and a covered way at Cane Hill Hospital.

1923. Various station names changes, following amalgamations between various Railway companies.

Railway stations' names:

- Stoats Nest (1841–1856). Located over 500 yards to the north of the current stations. Closed December 1856. On the London-Brighton line.
- Coulsdon South. Named 'Coulsdon' (1889), 'Coulsdon and Cane Hill' (1896), 'Coulsdon East' (1923), 'Coulsdon South' (1929). Located on the original London and Brighton Railway.
- Coulsdon North. Named 'Stoats Nest and Cane Hill' (1899–1910) or simply 'Stoats Nest' and replaced the earlier 'Stoats Nest Station', which was further north, 'Coulsdon and Smitham Downs' (1911), 'Coulsdon West' (1923), 'Coulsdon North' (later in 1923). The station closed in 1983. It was on the Quarry Line and included terminal platforms and sidings.
- Coulsdon Town. Named 'Smitham' (1904), 'Coulsdon' (2010), 'Coulsdon Town' (2011). On the Tattenham Corner line.
- Reedham (Surrey). Named 'Reedham Halt' (1911), 'Reedham (Surrey)' (1980). On the Tattenham Corner line.
- Kenley. Named "Coulsdon" (1856), it was intended to serve the residents of Old Coulsdon. The station was shortly renamed as "Kenley". On the Caterham Line.
- Woodmansterne. Opened in 1932, meeting the demand from new housing in the area. On the Tattenham Corner line.

== Notable residents ==
- Arthur Thomas Chapman, builders' merchant and estate developer
- Herbert Edlin, botanist and forester
- Gordon Pirie, long-distance runner
