= Happy Valley Park =

Public park in London, England

Coordinates: 51.295605°N 0.115443°W

Happy Valley
- Site of Special Scientific Interest
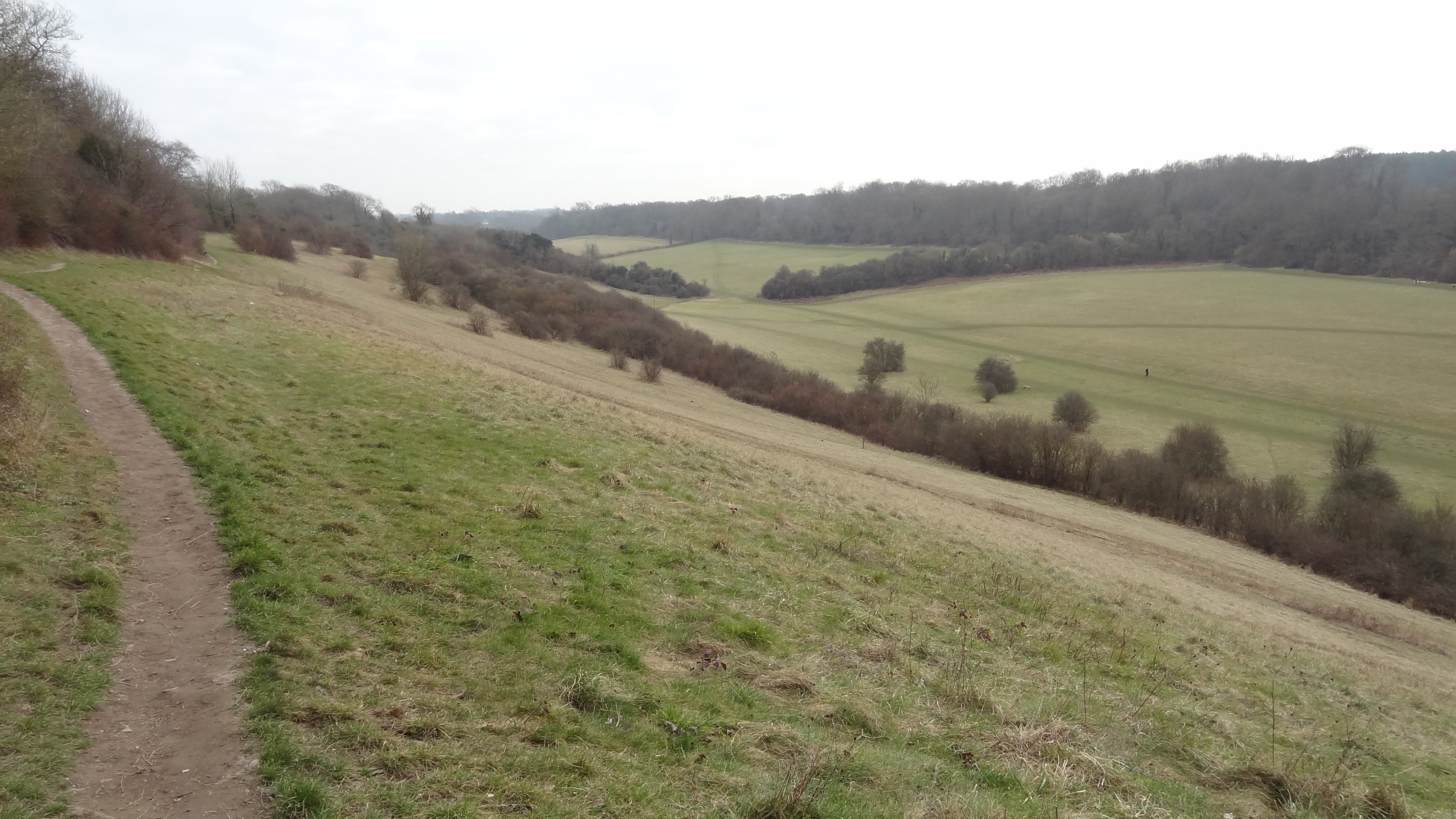
- Location of Happy Valley.
- Area of search: Greater London
- Grid reference: TQ310565
- Interest: Biological
- Area: 67.2 ha (166 acres)
- Notification date: 1987
- Location map: Magic Map

Happy Valley Park is a public park in Coulsdon in the London Borough of Croydon. It is owned and managed by Croydon Council. Located in the Green Belt, most of it forms part of the Farthing Downs and Happy Valley Site of Special Scientific Interest.

The 67-hectare (170-acre) site is a steeply sided valley with large areas of grassland and wooded slopes. The diverse chalk grasslands on the eastern and north-western sides are rich in many species of herb which are uncommon in London, and the nationally scarce man orchid and round-headed rampion have also been recorded. Devilsden Wood on the western side has a canopy of ash, oak and hazel. Trees such as midland hawthorn and plants such as sweet woodruff are characteristic of ancient woodlands.

== History ==
The site was purchased in 1937 by the former Coulsdon and Purley Council as a link between Farthing Downs and Coulsdon Common under the Green Belt scheme. The name Happy Valley was adopted in 1970.

== Access ==
There is access from Fox Lane, off Coulsdon Road, and from Farthing Downs. The London Loop goes through the park.

== See also ==
- List of Sites of Special Scientific Interest in Greater London
- Croydon parks and open spaces
