= Redhill railway station =

Railway station in Surrey, England

Redhill
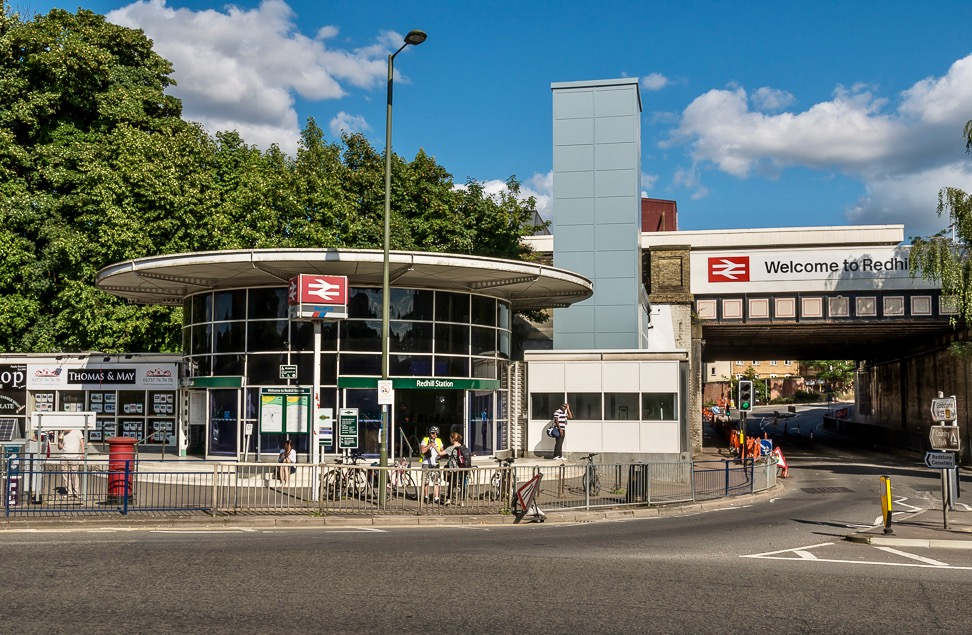
- Main station building
- Interactive map of Redhill

General information
- Location: Redhill
- Local authority: Borough of Reigate and Banstead
- Grid reference: TQ281506
- Managed by: Southern
- Station code: RDH
- DfT category: C1
- Number of platforms: 4 (numbered 0–3)
- Accessible: Yes
- Fare zone: D

National Rail annual entry and exit
- 2020–21: ▼0.751 million
- Interchange: ▼0.190 million
- 2021–22: ▲2.053 million
- Interchange: ▲0.512 million
- 2022–23: ▲2.712 million
- Interchange: ▲0.883 million
- 2023–24: ▲2.930 million
- Interchange: ▼0.627 million
- 2024–25: ▲3.175 million
- Interchange: ▲0.699 million

Key dates
- 12 July 1841: Opened as Redhill and Reigate Road (L&BR)
- 26 May 1842: Opened as Redhill (SER)
- 1843: Renamed Reigate (SER)
- 15 April 1844: Both stations closed and relocated to new Redhill and Reigate built by SER
- August 1858: Renamed Red Hill Junction after reconstruction
- July 1929: Renamed Redhill

Other information
- External links: Departures; Facilities
- Coordinates: 51°14′25″N 0°09′57″W

Redhill railway station serves the town of Redhill, Surrey, England. The station is a major interchange point on the Brighton Main Line, 22 miles 40 chains (36.2 km) measured from London Charing Cross. It is managed by Southern, and is also served by Thameslink and Great Western Railway.

== History ==
The local topography determined that it was cheaper to build and operate a railway line between London and Brighton which by-passed the parliamentary borough and long-established market town of Reigate and instead passed through the nearby Redstone or Red Hill gap in the Reigate Foreign (countryside) parish. According to the Acts of Parliament establishing railways between London and Brighton, and London and Dover, the line was to be shared between Croydon and Red Hill after which these two would deviate. The London and Brighton Railway (L&BR) constructed the new line during 1840 and 1841, with the South Eastern Railway (SER) contributing half of the construction cost and taking ownership of the section between Croydon and Red Hill. The continuing conflict between the two railway companies over the use of this joint line gave rise to the construction of four railway stations at the site of what was then a hamlet on the eastern side of Reigate.

=== Red Hill and Reigate Road (London & Brighton Railway) station ===
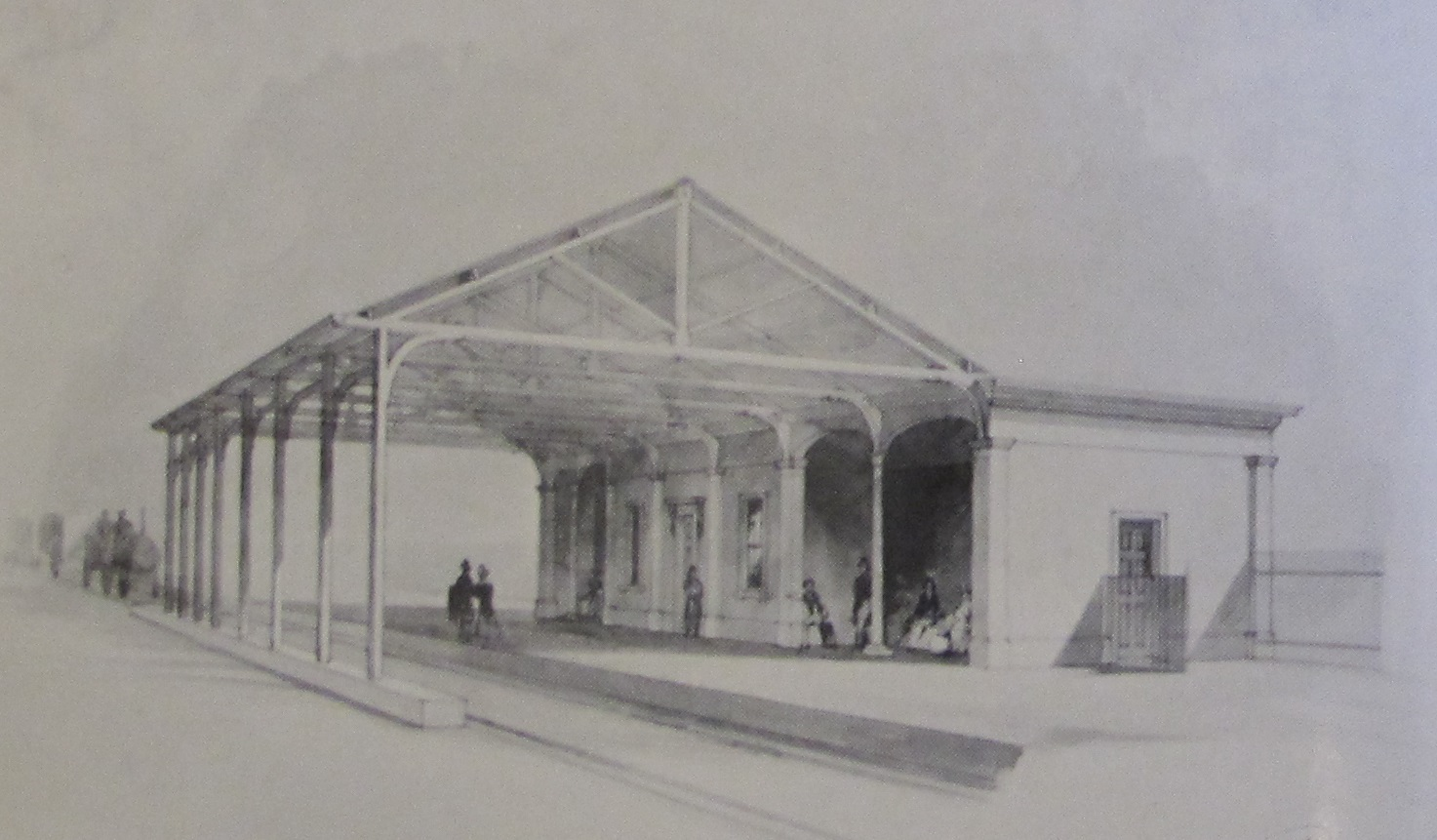
Red Hill and Reigate Road railway station in 1841.

The original station was opened by the London and Brighton Railway on 12 July 1841 on a site to the south of the proposed junction with the South Eastern Main Line to Dover. The nearby market town was served by a horse-drawn omnibus service operated by the railway. This station was designed by the architect David Mocatta, and was one of a series of standardised modular buildings used by the railway. It closed on 15 April 1844, when the L&BR began to share the SER Redhill and Reigate station and was demolished soon afterwards.

=== Redhill/Reigate (SER) stations ===
On 26 May 1842 the SER opened what was originally called 'Redhill', but later misleadingly renamed 'Reigate' station, on their own stretch of line just beyond the junction. Passengers transferring between the two railways did so at the old Merstham station further up the line. The SER wanted to replace their 'Reigate' station with a joint station immediately before the junction, but the L&BR opposed the plan. As a result, the SER forced the issue by ending the arrangements at Merstham, thereby forcing passengers to transfer between the two stations at Redhill by foot.

=== Redhill and Reigate station ===
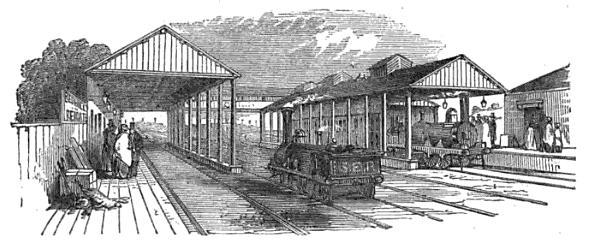
Redhill and Reigate station c.1853

On 15 April 1844 the SER built a new station at the present site, named 'Redhill and Reigate' which was to be used by both railways as the interchange station. On the same day the two existing stations were closed. The branch line to Reigate was opened in 1849 with a new station called Reigate Town. Nevertheless, the London Brighton and South Coast Railway (the successor of the L&BR) continued to operate the omnibus service for its own passengers.

=== Redhill Junction station ===
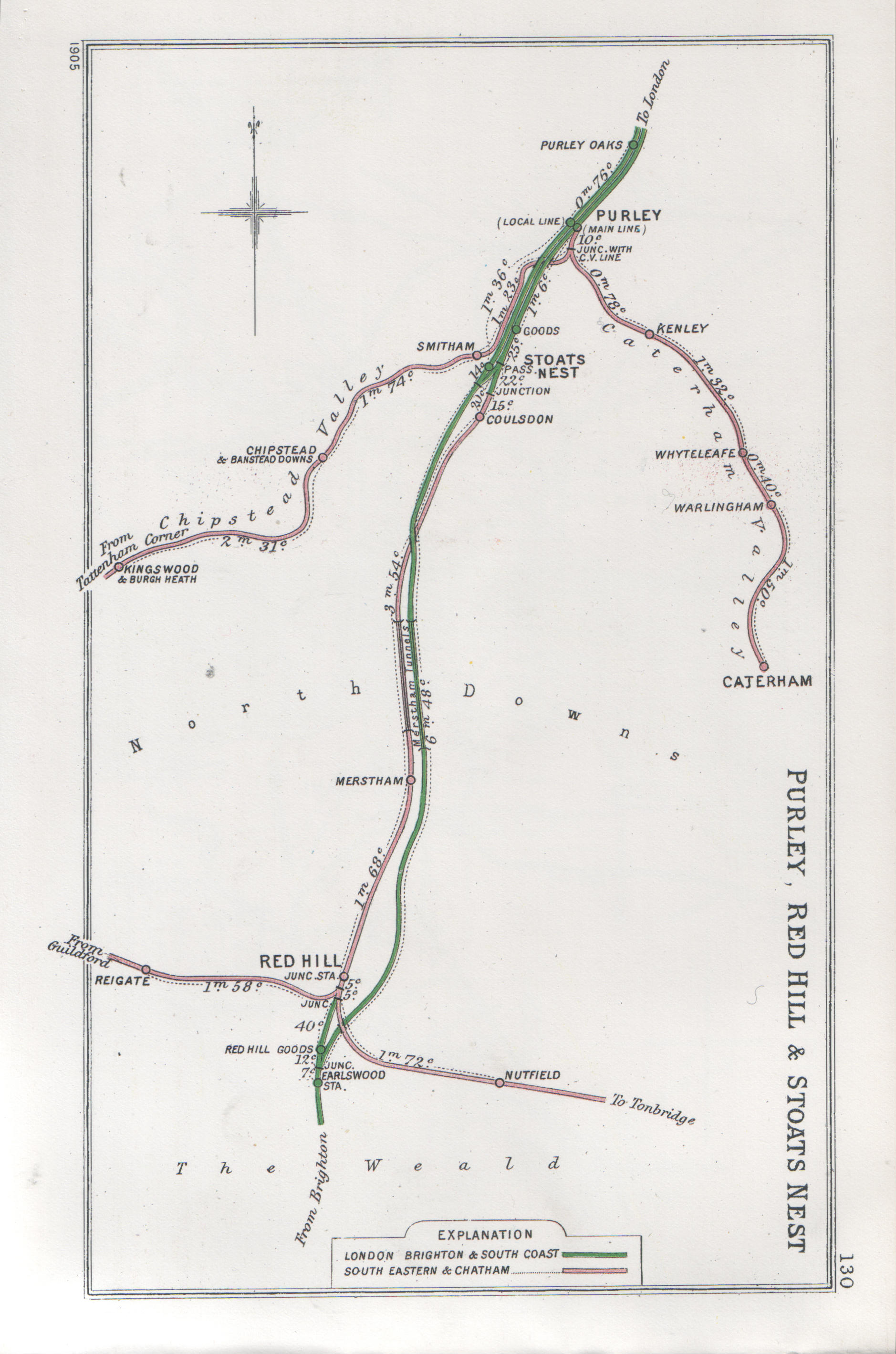
A 1905 Railway Clearing House junction diagram, including the two lines between Purley and Redhill (original line of 1841 in pink; "Quarry Line" of 1899 in green)

The SER 'Redhill and Reigate' station was rebuilt and enlarged on the same site in August 1858 when it was renamed 'Redhill Junction'. The chronic congestion at the station was however eased after 1 May 1868 when Redhill ceased to be on the South Eastern Main Line to Dover following the opening of the 'Sevenoaks cut off' line between St Johns and Tonbridge railway station. A ten-year agreement between the SER and the London Brighton and South Coast Railway (LB&SCR the successor to the L&BR after July 1846) over the use of the station and lines to Coulsdon was signed 1 February 1869 and renewed ten years later.

During the 1880s, as traffic increased, the disputes over the use of line and Redhill station re-occurred. This became known as the 'Southern Lines Controversy' and ultimately led to the construction of the Quarry Line by the LB&SCR in 1899, which avoided Redhill. The LB&SCR diverted many of its Brighton Main Line trains to the new line, but retained running powers over the original line and the use of Redhill station. These were continued until both the SER and the LB&SCR came under the ownership of the Southern Railway 1 January 1923 and the name of the joint station was changed to Redhill in July 1929.

=== Electrification ===
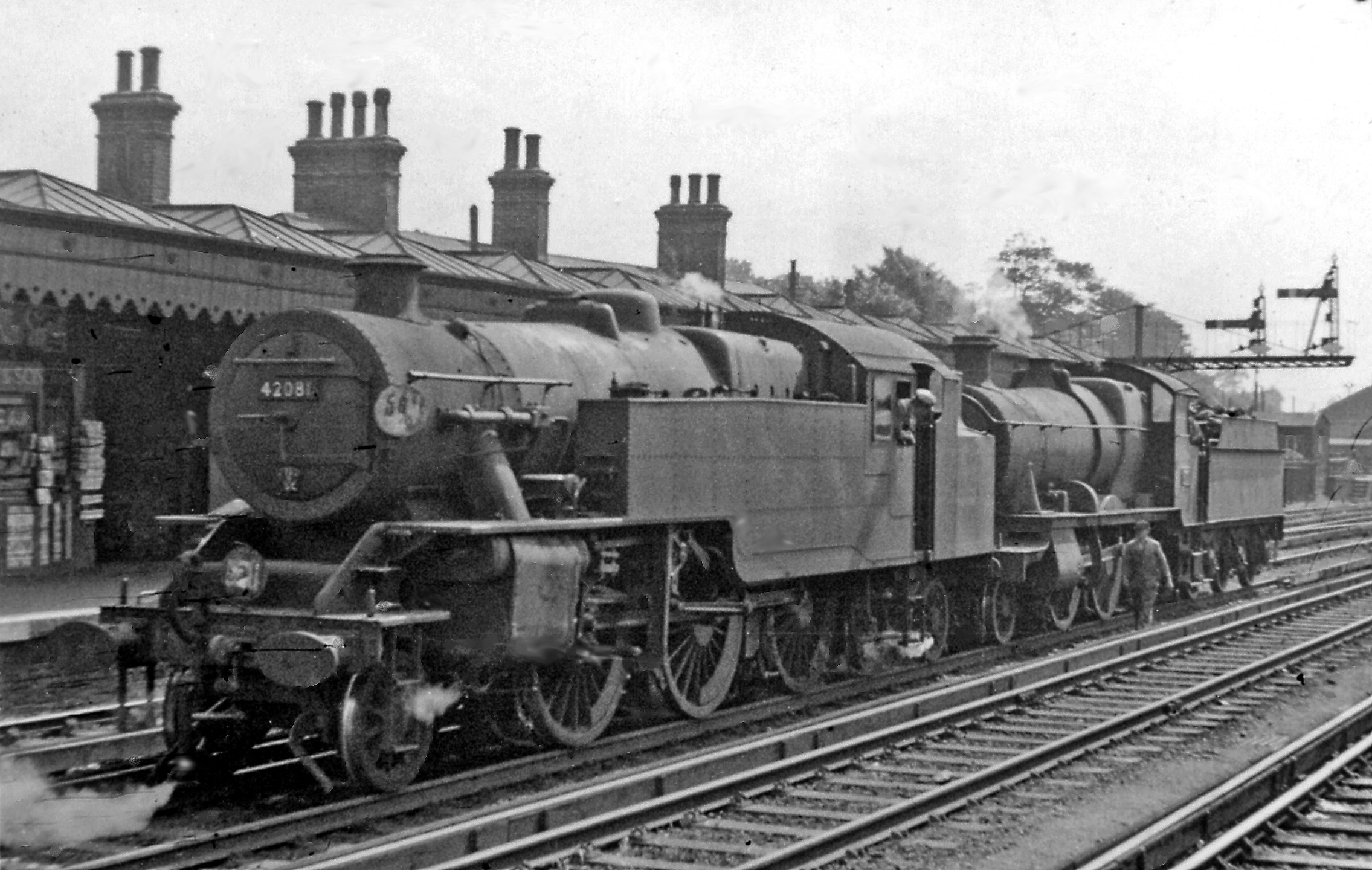
View northward from the Down platform in 1955

The Brighton Main Line and the line from Redhill to Reigate were both electrified under the Southern Railway on 1 January 1933. The Redhill to Tonbridge Line was electrified under British Rail in 1993.

== Description ==
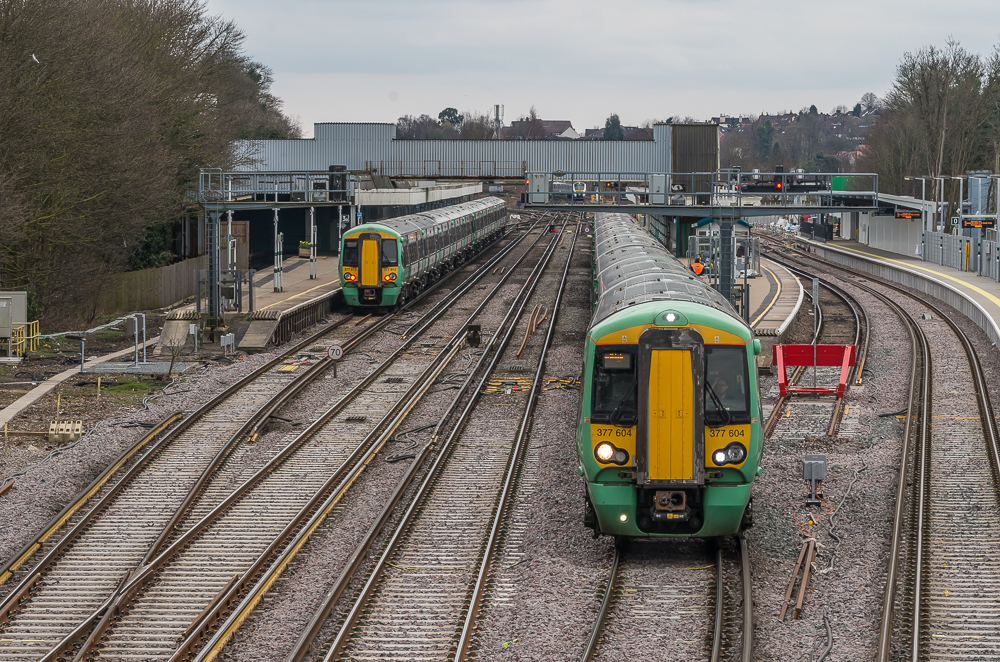
2018 Layout looking southwards with the new Platform 0 to the right

Redhill station is at the junction of the Brighton Main Line, which runs north to London and south to Gatwick Airport and Brighton, with the ex-SER North Downs Line, which runs west to Guildford and Reading, and the Redhill to Tonbridge Line, to the east

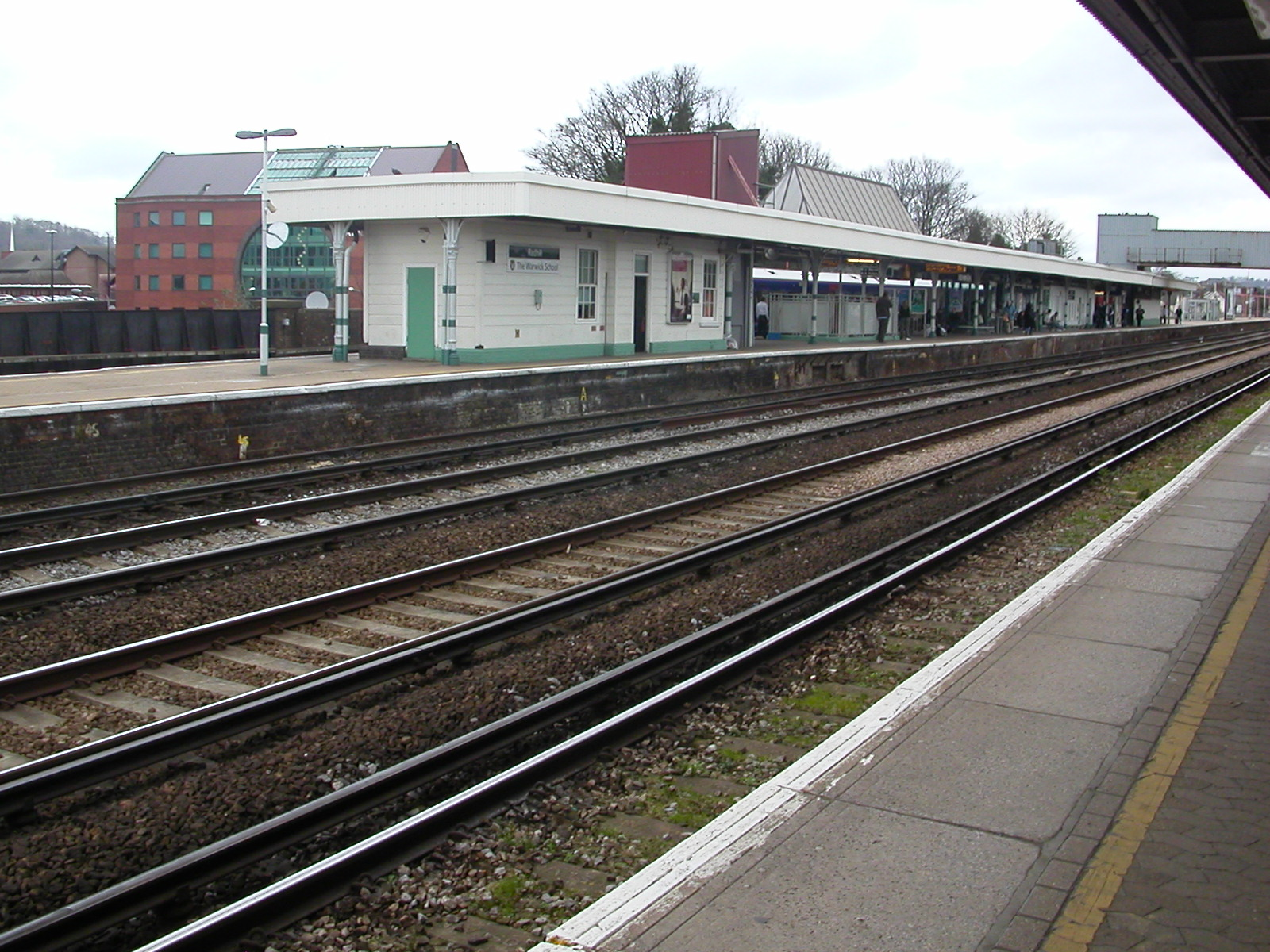
Platforms 1a/1b (far side) and 2a/2b at Redhill, with the through lines and the edge of Platform 3 visible. The disused parcels bridge is in the background. Platform 0 was not yet built when this photo was taken.

The station has four passenger platforms and a parcels bay (which is now out of use). From west to east: platform 0 is the most recently built (which accounts for its unusual numbering) and serves destinations including Bedford, Reading, London Victoria and Reigate; platforms 1 and 2 are an island; there are two through lines between platforms 2 and 3; platform 3 and the old parcels dock are on the eastern side with a secondary entrance/exit. All passenger platforms are of 12 car length, and all are subdivided into 'a' (north end) and 'b' (south end). Platform 1 became a bay platform with no northbound access, when platform 0 opened. Its operational length was reduced to 8 car as a result of the signalling changes associated with platform 0. Otherwise all platforms have access to all routes. There is no access from either through line to or from the North Downs Line – all traffic from this direction must pass through a platform.

Platforms are linked by a subway, and by an out-of use parcels/staff bridge. There are lifts from the platforms to the subway and a level entrance from the Platform 3 exit, with a further lift between the subway and the main entrance, which is at street level. The main entrance faces the town centre, and is opposite Redhill bus station.

The ticket office is staffed and also has ticket machines, and there are ticket barriers. There is a coffee shop in the ticket hall, and a takeaway-only coffee shop on platforms 1 and 2.

== Services ==
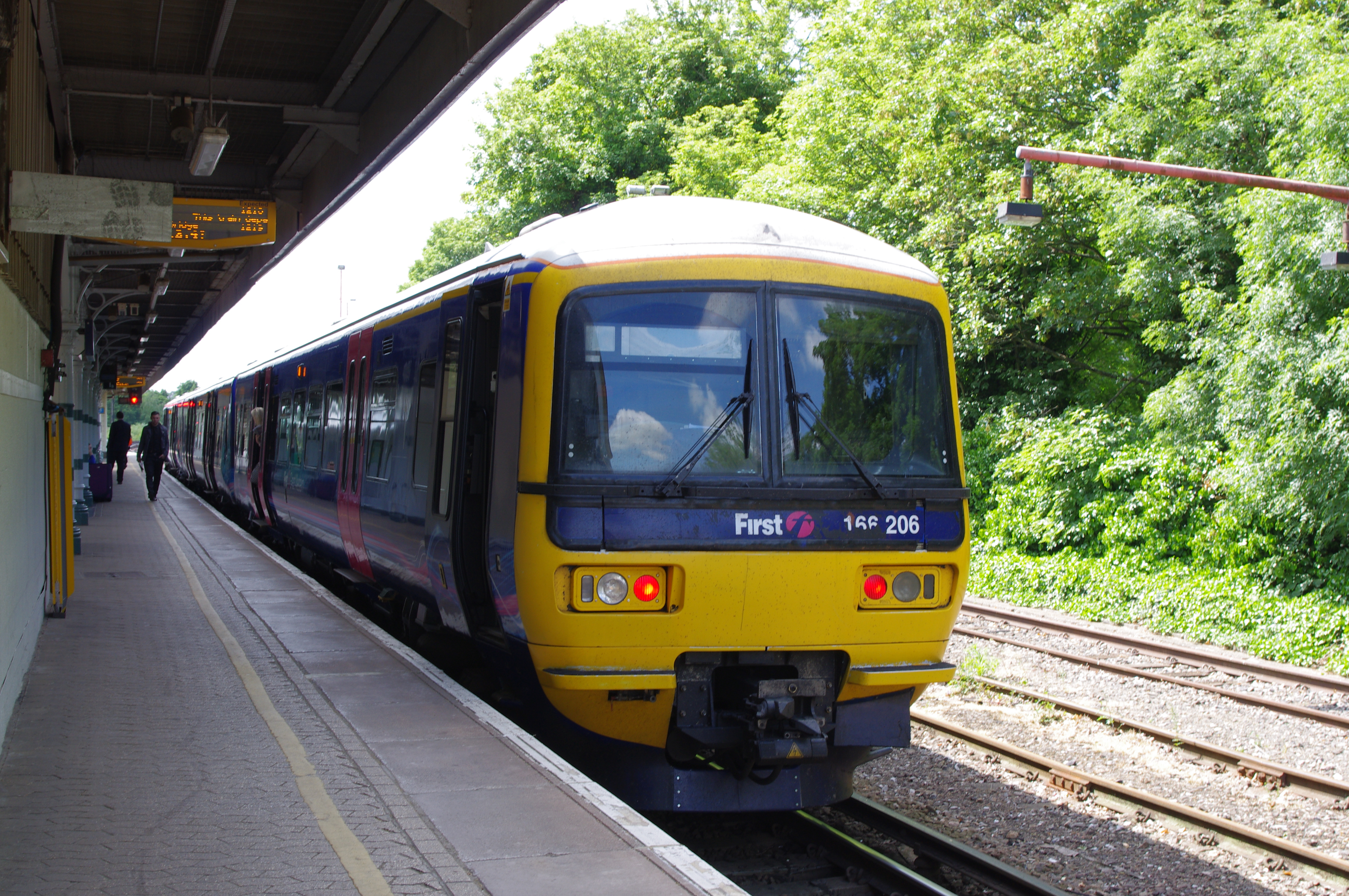
A Class 166 DMU (166 206) with a First Great Western service to Reading at platform 1; this route is served by diesel trains as third rail electrification is not installed on all of the North Downs Line. Platform 0 was not yet built when this photo was taken.

Services at Redhill are operated by Southern, Thameslink and Great Western Railway using Class 165, 166 DMUs, Class 377 and 700 EMUs.

Services at the station are as follows.

=== Southern ===
The typical off-peak service in trains per hour is:

- 2 tph to London Victoria
- 2 tph to Reigate
- 1 tph to Tonbridge

During the peak hours, the service to Reigate divides and attaches at Redhill with an additional portion continuing to and from Gatwick Airport.

On Sundays, the service between London and Reigate is reduced to hourly; the station is served by an additional hourly service between London Victoria, Portsmouth Harbour and Bognor Regis (dividing and attaching at Barnham) to maintain two trains per hour to and from Victoria.

=== Thameslink ===
The typical off-peak service in trains per hour is:

- 2 tph to Bedford via London Bridge
- 2 tph to Peterborough via London Bridge
- 4 tph to Three Bridges, of which 2 continue to Horsham

On Sundays, the service between Peterborough and Horsham does not operate; instead, one train per hour to and from Bedford is extended to and from Horsham.

=== Great Western Railway ===
Great Western Railway services from Reading to Gatwick Airport reverse at Redhill. The typical off-peak service in trains per hour is:

- 2 tph to Reading via Guildford
- 2 tph to Gatwick Airport

Preceding station	National Rail	Following station
Terminus	Southern Redhill to Tonbridge Line	Nutfield
Merstham	Southern North Downs Line	Reigate
Merstham	Southern Brighton Main Line Peak Hours Only	Earlswood
Merstham or Purley	Thameslink Brighton Main Line	Earlswood or Horley
Reigate	Great Western Railway North Downs Line	Gatwick Airport

==== Platform Layout ====
Redhill Station has four platforms, one of which is a bay platform.

- Platform 0 – Services to Reading via the North Downs Line, some services to London Victoria and Reigate.
- Platform 1 – South-facing bay platform with stopping services to Reading and trains towards Tonbridge.
- Platform 2 – All northbound Thameslink services and the majority of services to London Victoria.
- Platform 3 – All southbound Thameslink services and the majority of trains to Reigate.

== Oyster extension ==
On 11 January 2016, payment using Oyster and contactless payment cards was introduced at Redhill, as part of the Oyster extension from Merstham to Gatwick Airport. The station is outside the London Fare Zone area, and special fares apply.

Some Oyster photocards (as well as Freedom Passes) are not valid on the Gatwick Airport extension. The nearest station that these cards can be used is Coulsdon South only in the northbound direction.

== Motive power depot ==
An engine shed, turntable and locomotive coaling and servicing facilities were installed by the South Eastern Railway in 1855 in the area between the Brighton and Tonbridge lines. These facilities were rebuilt by the Southern Railway in 1924 and lasted until the end of steam in the area in 1965. The site of the depot remained in use as a stabling point for many years after this. Further sidings to the west and south-west of platform 1 were removed during the construction of platform 0 in 2016–17.
