= Coulsdon South railway station =

National Rail station in London, England

Coulsdon South
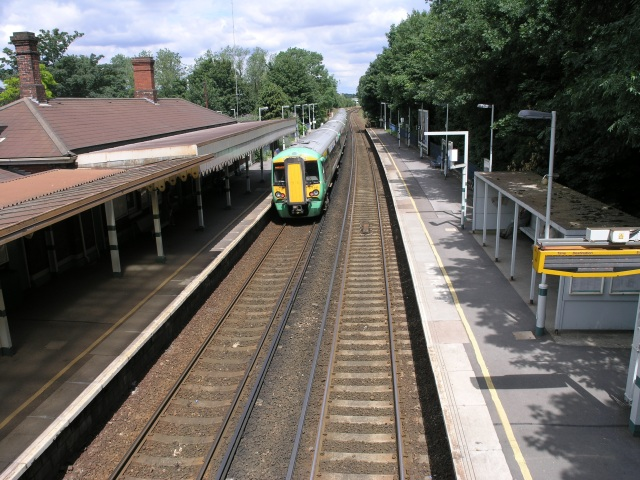
- Interactive map of Coulsdon South

General information
- Location: Coulsdon
- Local authority: London Borough of Croydon
- Managed by: Southern
- Station code: CDS
- DfT category: D
- Number of platforms: 2
- Accessible: Yes
- Fare zone: 6

National Rail annual entry and exit
- 2020–21: ▼0.459 million
- 2021–22: ▲1.222 million
- 2022–23: ▲1.556 million
- 2023–24: ▲1.735 million
- 2024–25: ▲1.960 million
- Interchange: 44,387

Railway companies
- Original company: South Eastern Railway
- Pre-grouping: South Eastern and Chatham Railway
- Post-grouping: Southern Railway

Key dates
- 1 October 1889: Opened

Other information
- External links: Departures; Facilities
- Coordinates: 51.3157°N 0.138°W

Coulsdon South railway station serves Coulsdon in the London Borough of Croydon, and is in London fare zone 6, on the Brighton Main Line. It is 17 miles 3 chains (27.42 km) measured from London Charing Cross. The station is served by Southern and by Thameslink. It is the most southerly mainline station in Greater London.

== History ==
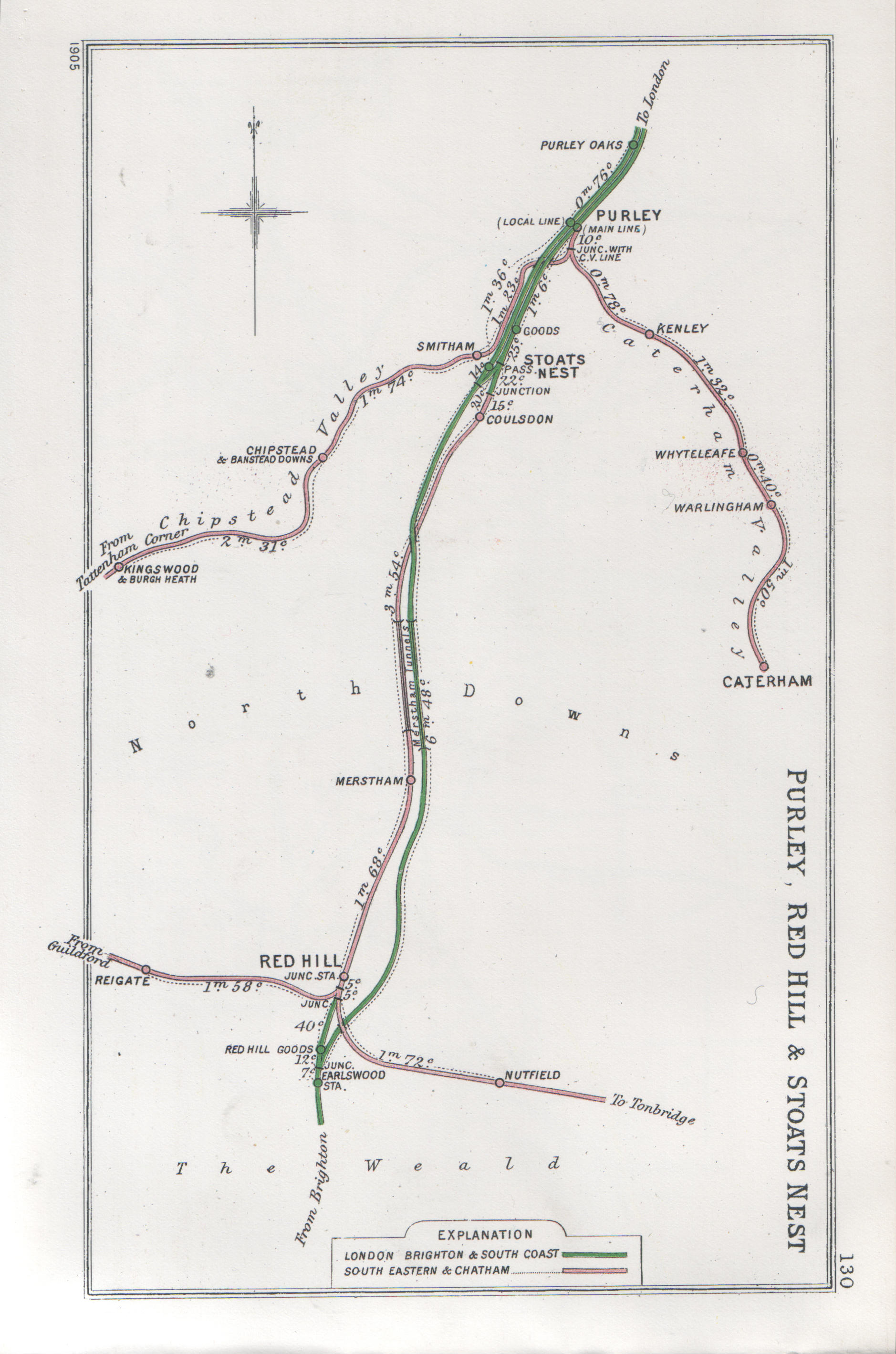
A 1905 Railway Clearing House map of lines around Coulsdon South railway station

Coulsdon is on a stretch of line between Croydon and Redhill which the UK Parliament insisted should be shared by the London and Brighton Railway (L&BR) route to Brighton, and the South Eastern Railway (SER) route to Dover. As a result, there have been a number of railway stations at Coulsdon.

=== Coulsdon South ===
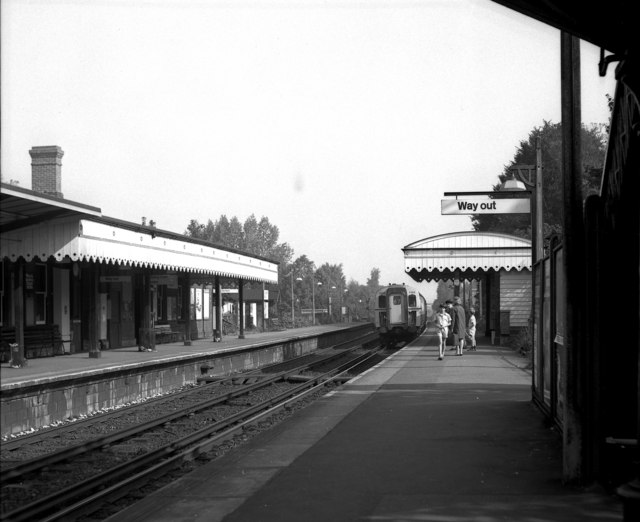
Coulsdon South in 1971 with a Class 423 at platform 2

This station was opened by the South Eastern Railway (SER) on 1 October 1889. The line is on a steep gradient climbing towards Merstham Tunnel. It is 17 miles 3 chains (27.4 km) from Charing Cross, and has two platforms each long enough for a 12-car train. It was originally called Coulsdon and Cane Hill, referring to the nearby psychiatric hospital: a covered way connected the station to the hospital. By the 1960s, the covered way had been removed.

=== Ticketing ===
The station remains staffed for most of the operational day, with a booking office located on the up (west) side of the station. At the entrance to the ticket office from the station approach road, there are two self-service ticket machines. Automatic Ticket Barriers were installed at the station in 2011.

=== Other stations in Coulsdon ===
- Stoats Nest for Coulsdon and Cane Hill (later Coulsdon North) was opened on 8 November 1899, by the LB&SCR on their Quarry Line which bypassed Redhill. It closed 3 October 1983.
- Smitham (later Coulsdon Town) was opened in 1904 by the SER on their Tattenham Corner Line and is named after another nearby settlement. This station was renamed from Smitham in 2011 as part of Southern Railway's new franchise agreement. This change was made as a result of a local consultation carried out by Croydon Council and it intended to better reflect the location of the station near Coulsdon town centre.

=== Miscellaneous ===
On 16 January 1985, David Bowie's schizophrenic half-brother, Terry, died by suicide when he walked in front of a train at Coulsdon South railway station. This incident inspired Bowie to write a song about suicide.

In May 2019, work began to install a new accessible footbridge with lifts and tactile paving. The work was completed in August 2020 having been delayed due to the COVID-19 pandemic.

== Services ==
Services at Coulsdon South are operated by Southern and Thameslink using Class 377 and 700 EMUs.

The typical off-peak service in trains per hour is:

- 2 tph to London Victoria
- 2 tph to Peterborough via London Bridge
- 2 tph to Reigate
- 2 tph to Horsham via Gatwick Airport

On Sundays, the service between London and Reigate reduces to hourly. In addition, the Peterborough to Horsham service doesn’t run, instead the Bedford to Three Bridges service operates through the station (with some extending to Horsham)

Preceding station	National Rail	Following station
East Croydon or Purley	Thameslink Brighton Main Line	Merstham
Purley	Southern Brighton Main Line	Merstham

== Connections ==
London Buses routes 60, 404, 405, 463 and night route N68 serve the station.
