= Riddlesdown Common =

Green space in Kenley, England

Coordinates: 51.323562°N 0.092651°W

Riddlesdown
- Site of Special Scientific Interest
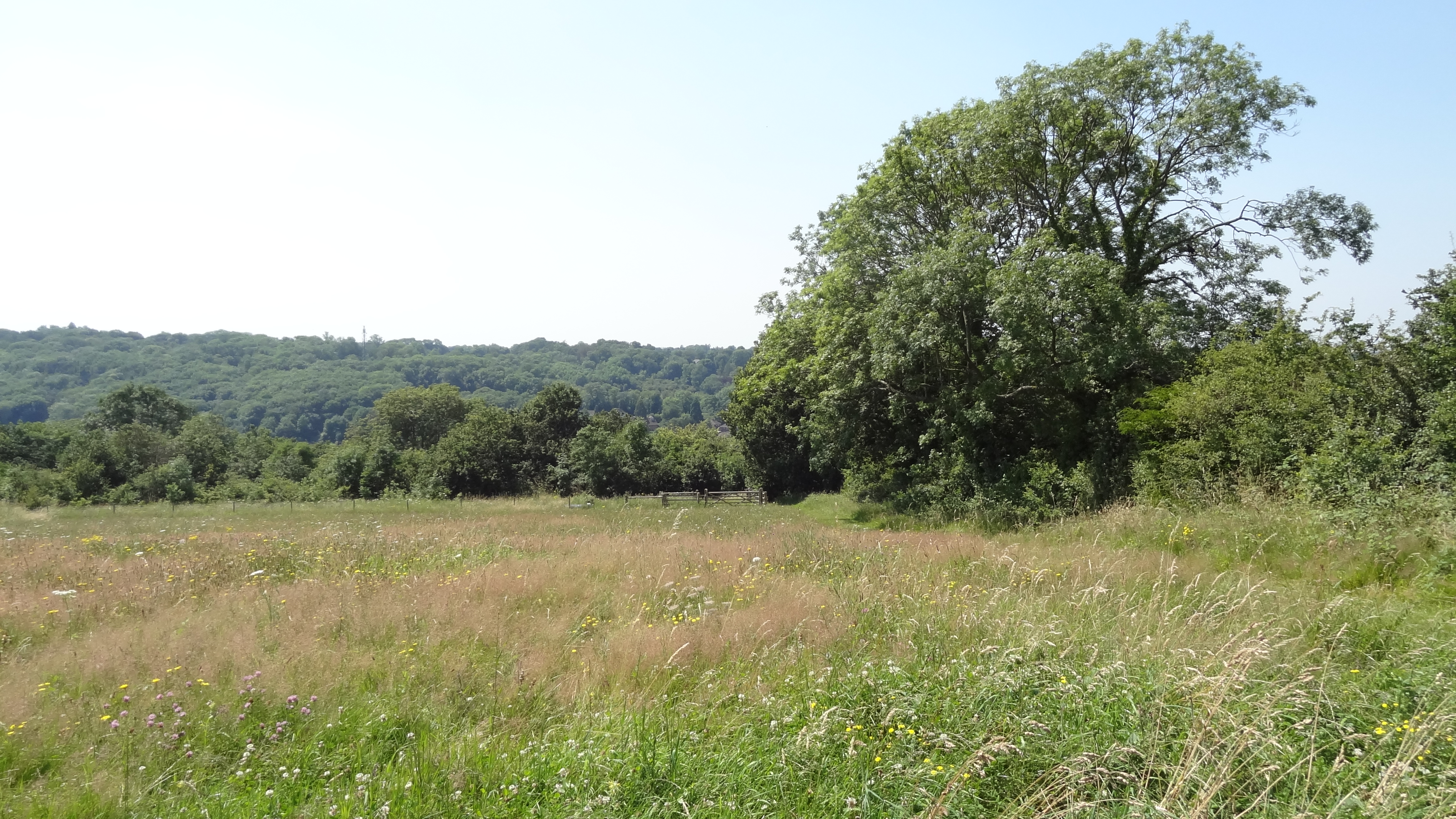
- Location of Riddlesdown.
- Area of search: Greater London
- Grid reference: TQ330600
- Interest: Biological
- Area: 32.0 ha (79 acres)
- Notification date: 1988
- Location map: Magic Map

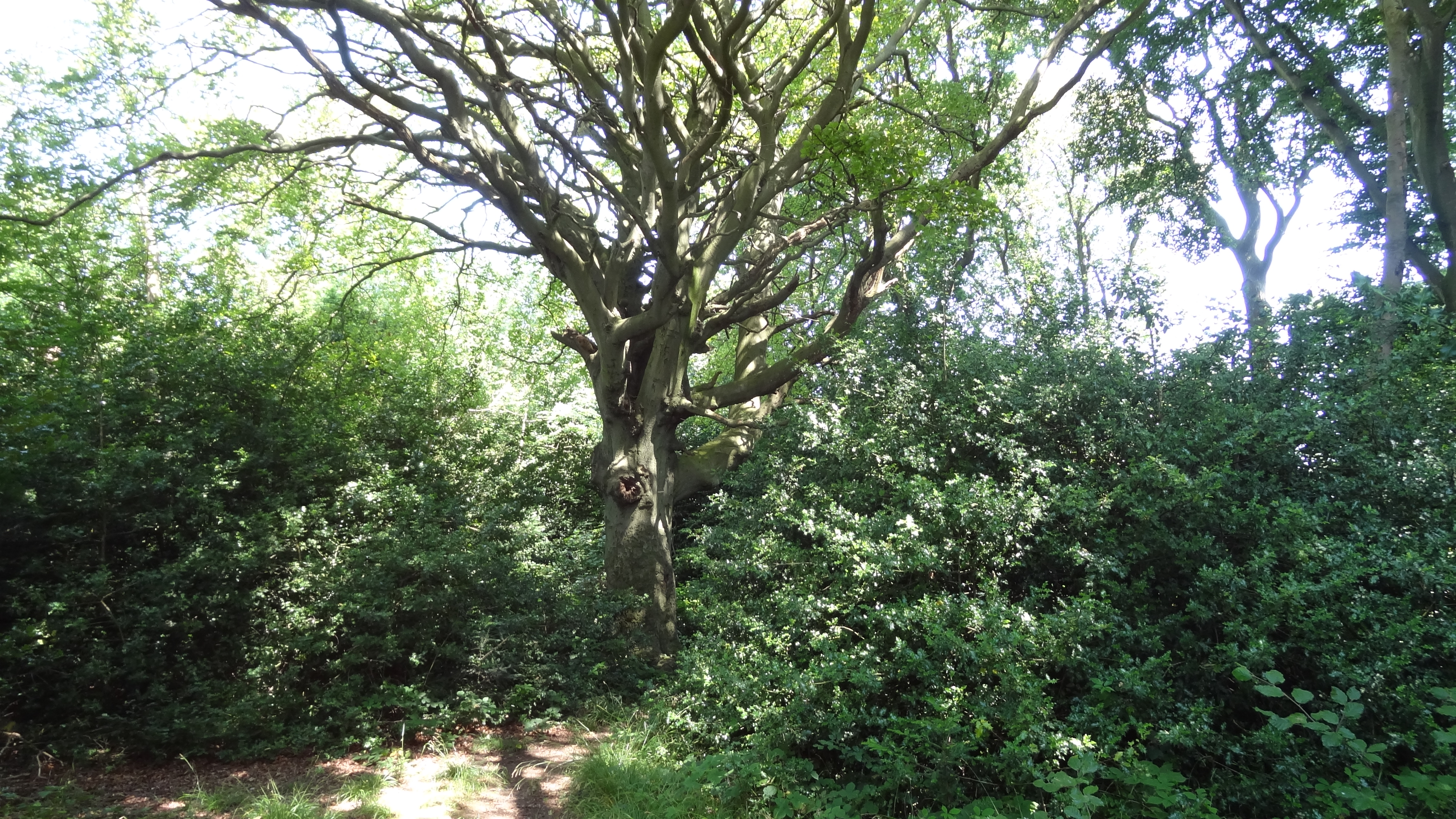
Coombes Wood in the northern corner of the site

Riddlesdown Common or Riddlesdown is a 43 hectare area of green space in Kenley, towards the northern end of the North Downs in the London Borough of Croydon. It is owned and maintained by the City of London Corporation, apart from two small areas, one of which is operated by the London Wildlife Trust and the other by Croydon Council. An area of 32 hectares is a biological Site of Special Scientific Interest. The name Riddlesdown also applies to the local district of residential housing. A trig point at the site indicates that it is 525 ft (160 m) above sea level.

== History ==
Discoveries of Neolithic stone axes and possible traces of Iron Age fields show that occupation goes back thousands of years. The name Riddlesdown is first recorded in 1331 as Ridelsdoune meaning 'cleared woodland on a hill'. In medieval time Riddlesdown and the neighbouring Kenley Common formed part of the waste land of the manor of Watendone, and the commoners rights included pasture for their livestock and gathering of materials for fuel. In the nineteenth century the coming of the railways increased the value of the land, and the lord of the manor, Edmund Byron, began enclosing the area. One local landowner, William Hall, refused to sell his land to Byron, and in 1877 Hall and his brother brought a case against Byron in the Court of Chancery for encroaching on Common Land. They were successful, William Hall then asked the Corporation of London to purchase the land to preserve it as open space. In 1883 the Corporation bought Riddlesdown and Kenley Common. They became part of the City Commons, seven green spaces in south London managed by the City Corporation of London.

== Site of Special Scientific Interest ==
An area of 32 hectares is the Riddlesdown Site of Special Scientific Interest. It is the largest area of calcareous scrub in Greater London, with a herb-rich chalk grassland. It includes a disused chalk quarry which is not open to the public. It has many mature yew trees, Taxus baccata. It is one of the few places in London with juniper Juniperus communis. There are two nationally rare herbs, early gentian (Gentianella anglica) and round-headed rampion. Invertebrate species include the scarce Roesel's bush-cricket. Several rare orchids can be found within the woodland some of which were thought to be extinct in the area or throughout London.

== Wider area ==
The site forms part of the Riddlesdown to Whyteleafe countryside area, which is managed by wardens working for the City of London, Croydon Council and Tandridge District Council.

== Access ==
There is access from Riddlesdown Road, Tithepit Shaw Lane and Godstone Road.

== See also ==
- List of Sites of Special Scientific Interest in Greater London
- List of parks and open spaces managed by the City of London Corporation
- Croydon parks and open spaces
