= Farthing Downs =

Nature reserve in Croydon, London, England

Coordinates: 51.308°N 0.138°W

Farthing Downs (including Eight Acres Common)
- Site of Special Scientific Interest
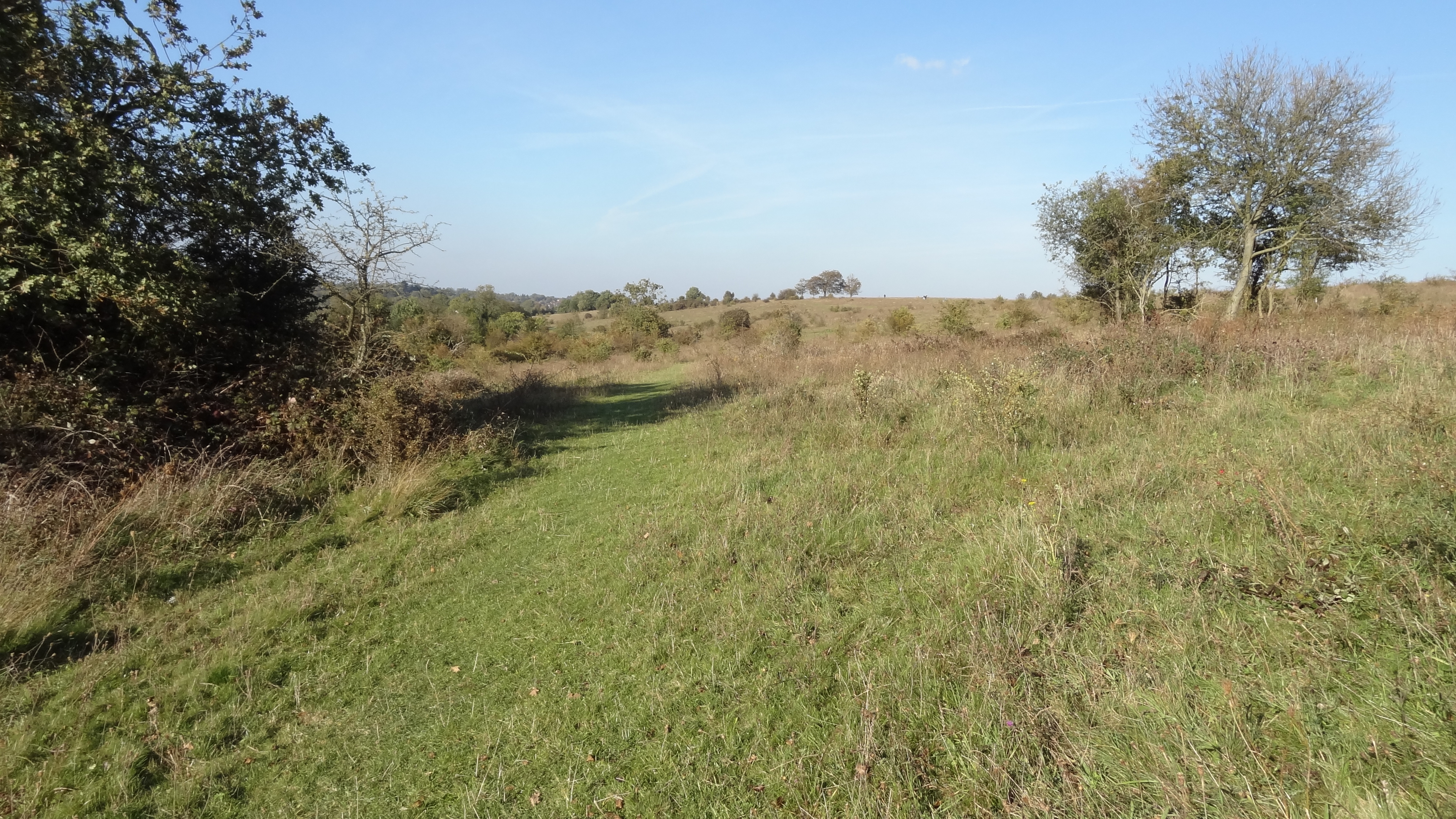
- Location of Farthing Downs (including Eight Acres Common).
- Area of search: Greater London
- Grid reference: TQ299579
- Interest: Biological
- Area: 53.3 ha (132 acres)
- Notification date: 1987
- Location map: Magic Map

Farthing Downs is an open space in Coulsdon in the London Borough of Croydon. Together with Eight Acres Common and New Hill to the south-east, it is owned and managed by the Corporation of London. Farthing Downs and Eight Acres Common are part of the Farthing Downs and Happy Valley Site of Special Scientific Interest. Happy Valley Park is a green space to the south owned by Croydon Council. Farthing Downs is also a scheduled monument.

Farthing Downs is a long strip of grassland with pockets of ancient woodland, which narrows to a point at the northern end. It is the most extensive area of semi-natural downland left in Greater London. Its chalk and natural grasslands have a large variety of rare herbs, including some which are nationally scarce, such as the wildflower greater yellow-rattle. This is specially protected by legislation and Farthing Downs and Happy Valley have the major part of the British population.

== History ==
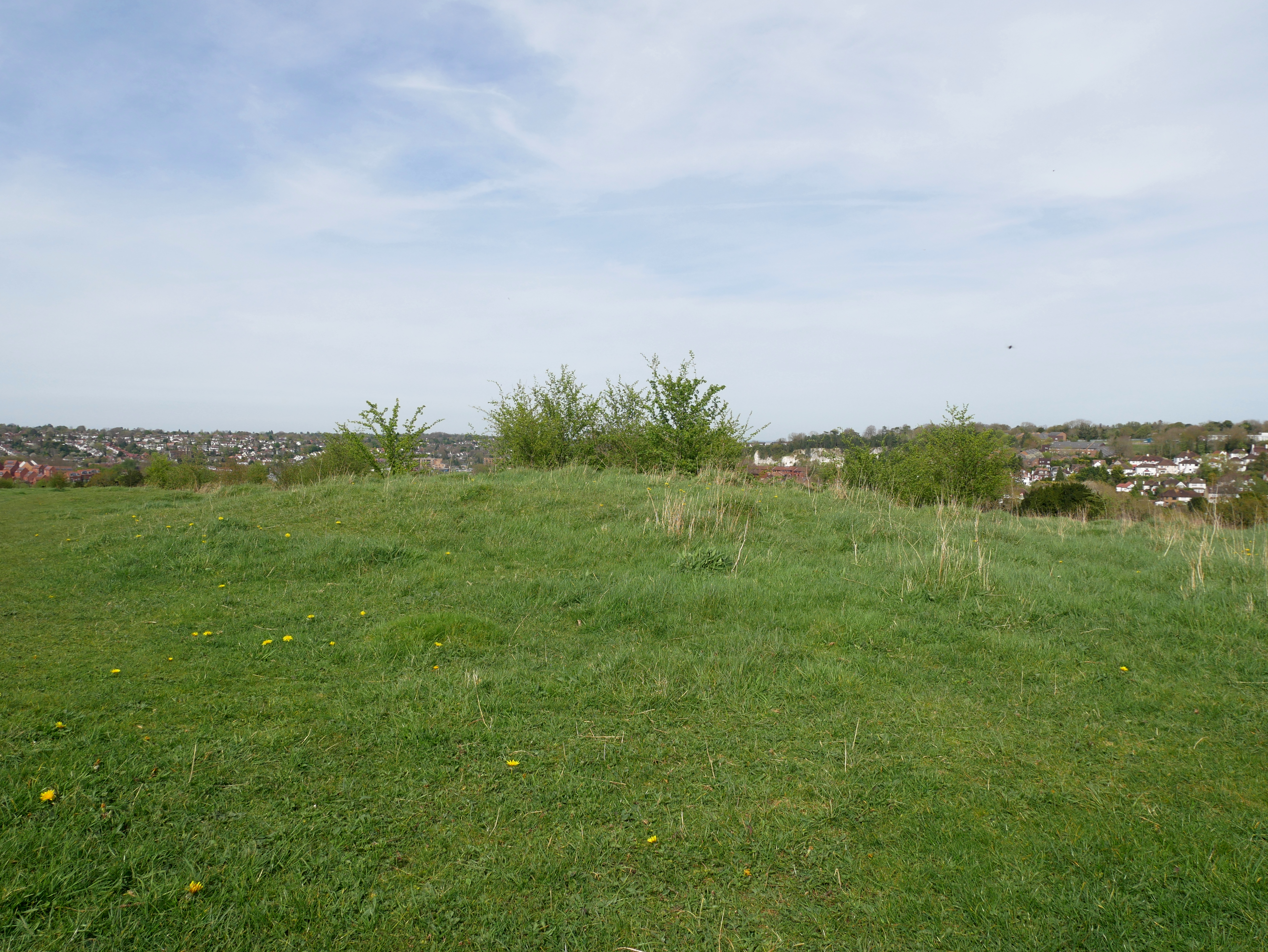
One of the surviving early medieval tumuli at the north end of the Downs

Archeological finds show human occupation back to the Neolithic. An Iron Age field system has been recorded at the northern end, and cultivation continued in the Roman period until the second century. Thereafter it was used as pasture for grazing. The banks of a late Iron Age/early Roman enclosure system survive with a central droveway, which still has the remains of cart ruts.

There are sixteen Anglo-Saxon barrows in two barrow cemeteries in the centre and the north of the site. These were excavated in 1871 by John Wickham Flower and again in the 1940s by Brian Hope-Taylor. In 2005 and 2006 further excavations were undertaken by Barry Taylor of English Heritage and Amy Gray Jones of the Museum of London Archaeology Service. Barry Taylor said:

Farthing Downs is one of the most impressive later prehistoric settlement sites that I've worked on. The earth and chalk banks that once formed the tracks and boundaries of the Iron Age landscape are still visible on the ground today, over two thousand years after they were constructed. These remains have fascinated people for centuries and even inspired the local Anglo-Saxon communities to bury their leaders along the line of these ancient earthworks.

During the mid nineteenth century Farthing Downs was famed for its gallops with both Epsom and local trainers using its springy turf to prepare their horses. It featured levelled ground, a lack of flints and a mix of flat track and hills. The lease for letting out training on the Downs was attached to the Red Lion at Smitham Bottom, which was the base for a succession of trainers. Three gallops were set out - a straight three quarter mile, a figure of eight track being two miles long and an S-shaped three and half mile course.

== Access ==
There is access from Downs Road and Ditches Lane traverses the site. The London Loop walk goes through it.

== Grasslands ==
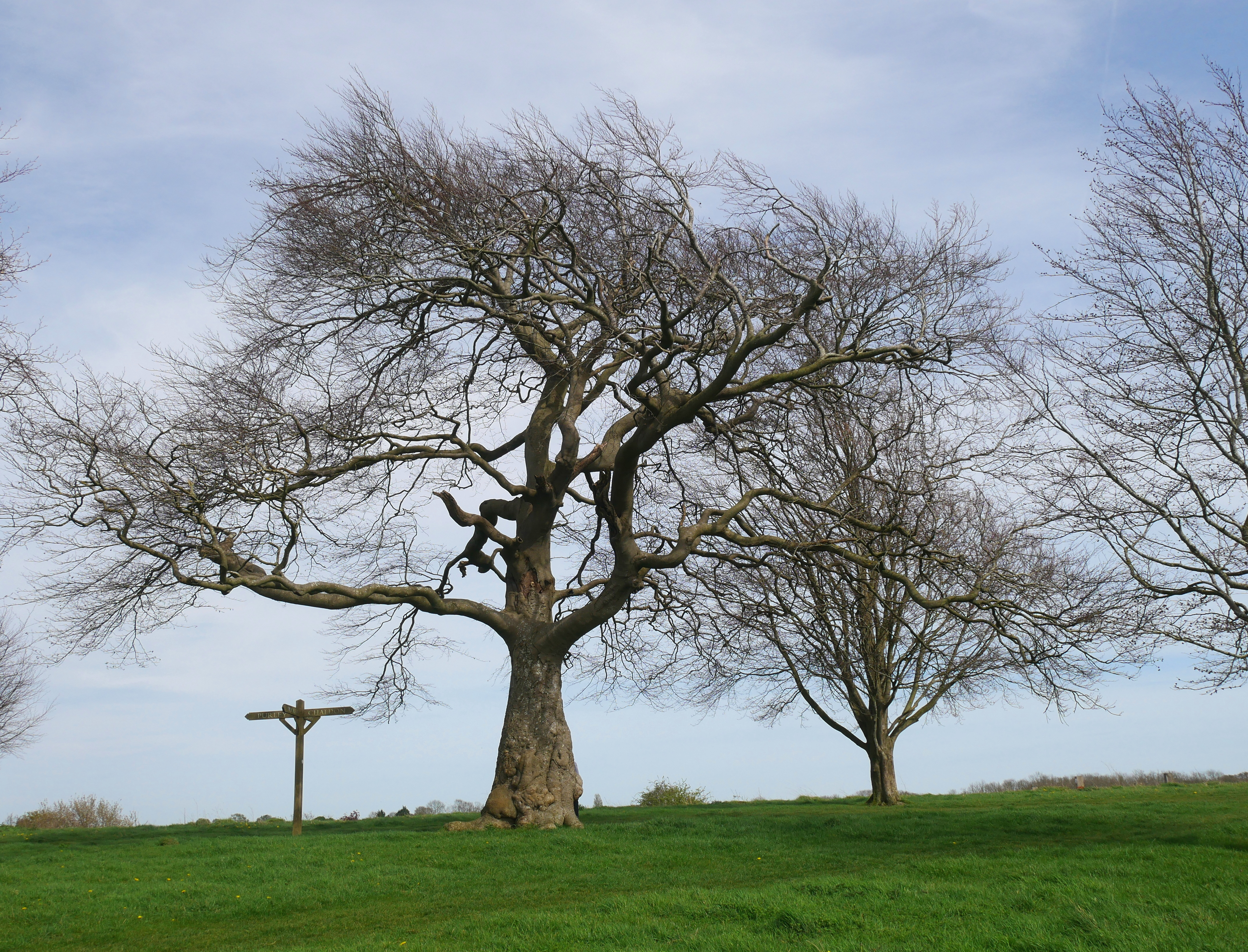
Trees atop Farthing Downs

Sheep and cattle graze at Farthing down to maintain the chalk grassland. The Corporation of London reintroduced this practice due to the decline of rabbits and the damage from corn farming in the past. Without proper grazing, stronger plants dominate and the biodiversity declines. Shepherds historically cleared scrub and woodland for their stock to maintain the grassland. The scrub at Farthing down is now an ideal habitat for important species of birds. The natural spread of the scrub is managed to protect the grassland but not cleared entirely due to its habitat benefits.

== See also ==
- List of Sites of Special Scientific Interest in Greater London
- Croydon parks and open spaces
