= Downlands Countryside Management Project =

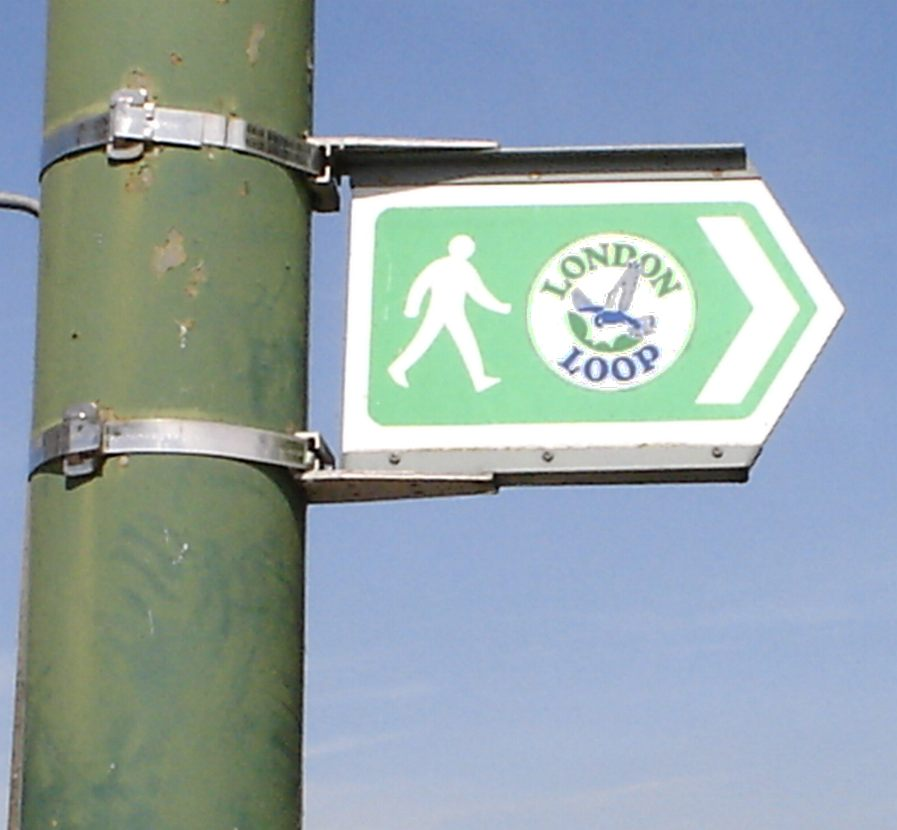
The walks in the London Loop are within the project

The Downlands Countryside Management Project established in 1988 is a partnership between six London and Surrey local authorities set up to manage an area of countryside of 130 km^{2} across the south of Outer London.

The main aims are the management of the rare chalk downland within the area; the development of an extensive network of trails (including the London Loop); and the improvements to signposting; rights of way; woodland and pond management.

The Project is supported by the boroughs of Sutton and Croydon; and by Surrey County Council; the City of London Corporation; the Surrey districts of Reigate and Banstead and Tandridge; and the Countryside Agency. An additional partner is Natural Britain.
