= Reigate railway station =

Railway station in Surrey, England

Coordinates: 51°14′31″N 0°12′14″W

Reigate
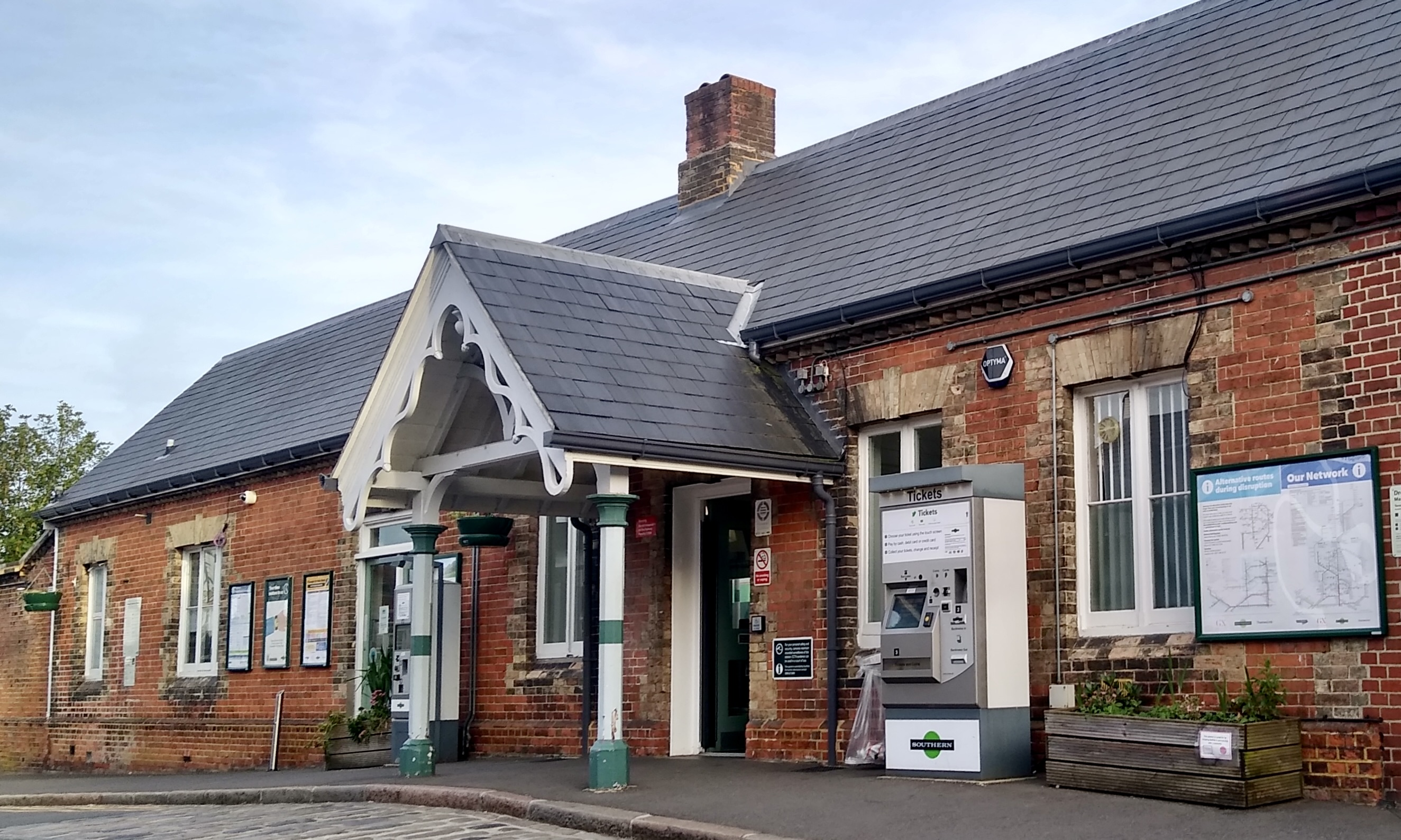
- The station building in 2026

General information
- Location: Reigate, Reigate and Banstead; England
- Grid reference: TQ254507
- Manager: Southern
- Platforms: 2

Other information
- Station code: REI
- Classification: DfT category D

History
- Original company: Reading, Guildford and Reigate Railway

Key dates
- 4 July 1849: opened as Reigate Town
- 1 November 1898: renamed Reigate

Passengers
- 2020/21: ▼0.369 million
- 2021/22: ▲0.893 million
- 2022/23: ▲1.005 million
- 2023/24: ▲1.046 million
- 2024/25: ▲1.169 million
Location
Notes
- Passenger statistics from the Office of Rail and Road

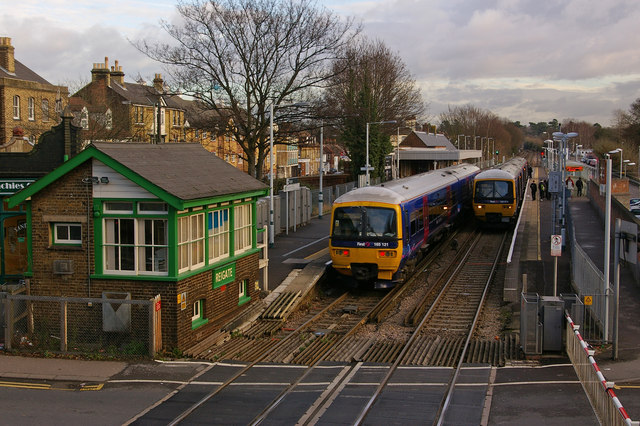
GWR trains at Reigate station

Reigate railway station serves the town of Reigate, Surrey, England, on the North Downs Line. It is 24 miles 27 chains (24.34 miles, 39.17 km) measured from London Charing Cross via Redhill. The station is managed by Southern.

== History ==
The original Reigate stations were located two miles from the town centre in a hamlet then known as Warwick Town but which later became Redhill. Red Hill and Reigate Road station was opened by the London and Brighton Railway on 12 July 1841. The nearby town was then served by a horse-drawn omnibus service operated by the railway. This was followed on 26 May 1842 by the South Eastern Railway (SER) Red Hill station (later misleadingly renamed 'Reigate'). Both these stations closed on 15 April 1844 when a new joint Redhill and Reigate station opened on the site of the present Redhill railway station.

The current Reigate station opened 4 July 1849 with the opening of the branch line from Redhill to Reigate by the Reading, Guildford and Reigate Railway; the original station building from that time is still in use today. The station was initially called Reigate Town. The station was operated by the SER until 1898, the South Eastern and Chatham Railway until 1922, the Southern Railway (UK) until 1947 and British Railways until 1997.

The line between Redhill and Reigate was electrified on 1 January 1933 but the remainder remains unelectrified.

== Services ==
Services at Reigate are operated by Southern and Great Western Railway using Class 165 and 166 DMUs and Class 377 EMUs.

The typical off-peak service in trains per hour is:

- 2 tph to London Victoria
- 2 tph to Gatwick Airport
- 2 tph to Reading via Guildford

On Sundays, the service to and from London Victoria is reduced to hourly.

The current service levels were introduced in May 2018 and represent a considerable improvement in the number of trains to and from London. Prior to May 2018, the station was served by an hourly service to London Victoria on weekdays and Saturdays only, with no Sunday service.

Preceding station	National Rail	Following station
Redhill	Southern North Downs Line	Terminus
Redhill	Great Western Railway North Downs Line	Betchworth

== Layout ==
The station has two platforms, numbered from left to right when looking towards Redhill. Platform 1 is long enough for an eight-car train but platform 2 can only accommodate up to six carriages. The platforms are connected by a subway.

Platform 1 is served by through services going eastbound towards Redhill and Gatwick Airport. Platform 2 is used by all westbound services towards Dorking, Guildford and Reading, as well as by eastbound services to Redhill and London that originate at Reigate.

There is an electrified siding to the east of station on the south side.

== Future ==
In 2020, Network Rail announced that they are planning to upgrade Reigate station, which includes constructing a new 12-carriage bay platform (number 3) on the south side of the station, and extending the existing platform 2 to also accommodate 12-car trains. Currently the track layout just east of the station forces Southern to turn its trains around on platform 2, and since this platform is not long enough to accommodate 8-car sets, Southern services to and from Reigate are limited to 4 carriages in length. The upgrade would enable longer trains to serve the station, and the new bay platform would allow trains to/from London to terminate there instead of occupying the through westbound track, thus improving reliability on the whole line.

Once the upgrade is delivered, there are further proposals to introduce Thameslink services running to London Bridge, London St Pancras and beyond to destinations north of London.

== Signal box ==
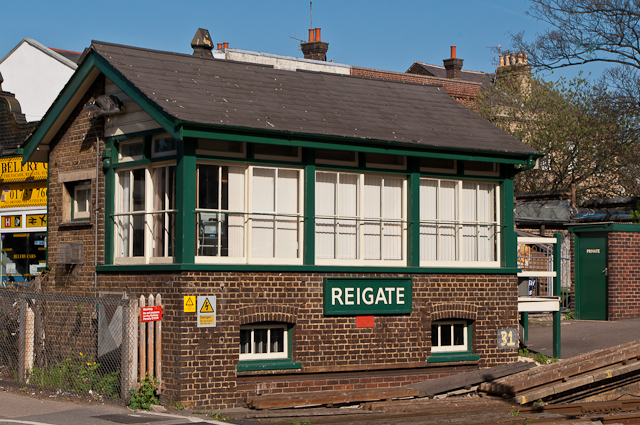
Reigate Signal Box

The station also incorporates a signal box, opened on 10 March 1929 to replace an earlier box at the other end of the station. The box controls the North Downs Line from Gomshall to Redhill and operates the adjacent level crossing gates. It is a Southern Railway type 11b brick built box and has 24 levers.

== Sources ==
- Mitchell, Vic; Smith, Keith (1989). Guildford to Redhill. Country rail routes. Midhurst: Middleton Press. ISBN 0-9065-2063-0.
