= List of London railway stations =

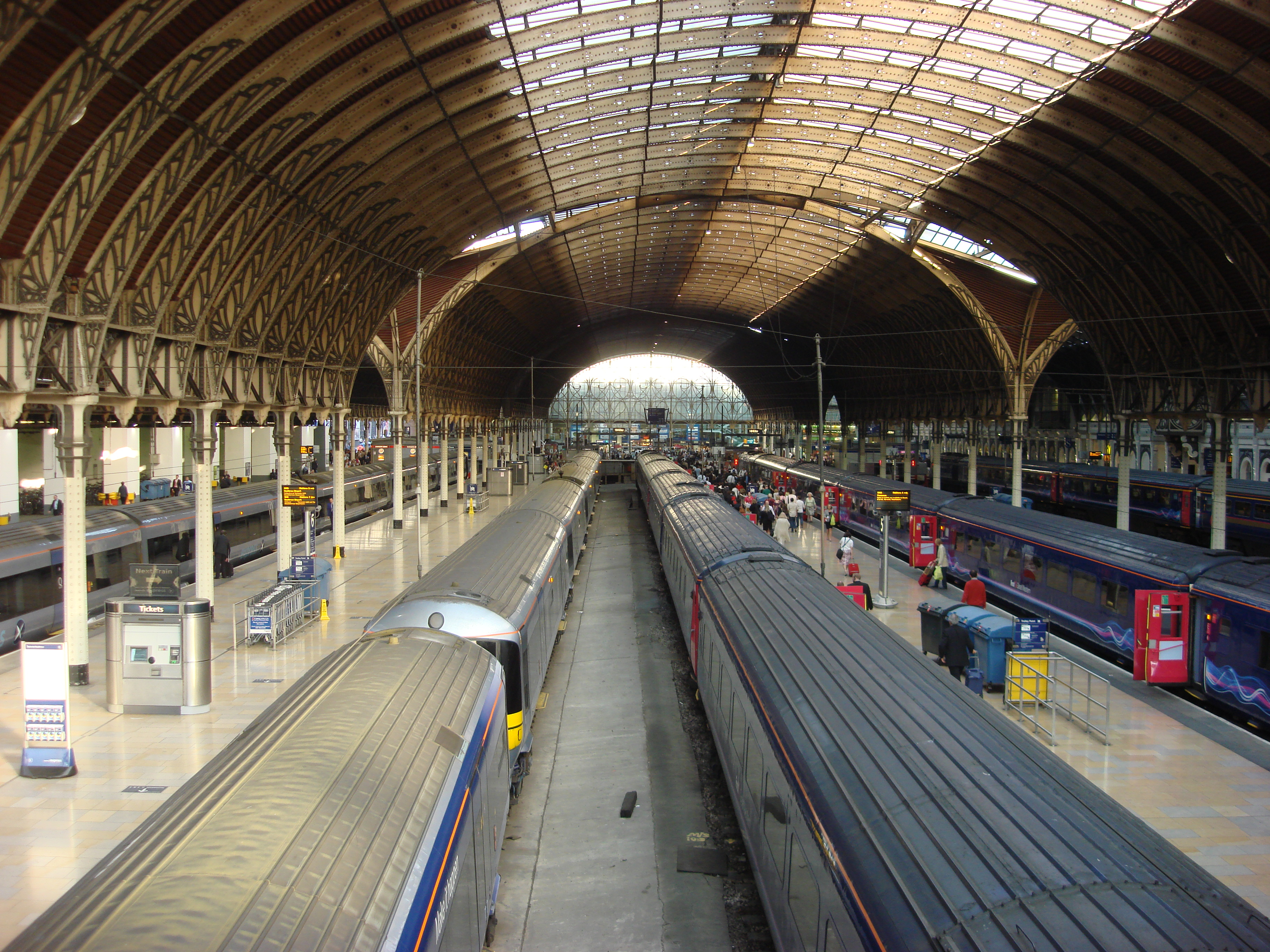
Paddington is the main London terminus for trains from south Wales and the West of England.

This is a list of the railway passenger stations in the first six fare zones across London, England (the majority of which are within the boundary of Greater London), in the national network where London area ticketing applies. United Kingdom railway stations are grouped into one of a number of categories, ranging from A—national hub to F—small unstaffed bare platform. Many of the principal central London stations are managed by Network Rail and together form a London station group. Most other stations are managed by the train operating company that provides the majority of services at the station. London Underground is the manager of some stations that are also served by other heavy rail services.

== Scope ==
Greater London is divided into six fare zones (with the exception of Stratford International, which is not in any fare zones), with zone 1 being the central area and zones 2–6 forming concentric rings around it. London zonal pricing is applied to journeys between stations wholly within zones 1–6.

The list includes National Rail stations within London fare zones 1–6, plus Stratford International. It does not include stations exclusively served by the London Underground, Tramlink and Docklands Light Railway.

There are a number of stations designated as zones 7, 8 or 9. These zones are totally outside Greater London where London area rail ticketing doesn't apply, and are treated differently compared to stations within zones 1–6, therefore they are excluded from the scope of this article.

== List of stations ==
| Station | Local authority | Managed by | Station code | Fare zone | Year opened | Category | Coordinates | Area served |
|---|---|---|---|---|---|---|---|---|
| Abbey Wood | Greenwich and Bexley | Elizabeth line | ABW | 4 | 1849 | C | 51.4915°N 0.1229°E | Abbey Wood and Thamesmead |
| Acton Central | Ealing | London Overground | ACC | 3 | 1853 | D | 51.5088°N 0.2634°W | Acton |
| Acton Main Line | Ealing | Elizabeth line | AML | 3 | 1868 | E | 51.5169°N 0.2669°W | Acton |
| Albany Park | Bexley | Southeastern | AYP | 5 | 1935 | D | 51.4358°N 0.1266°E | Albany Park |
| Alexandra Palace | Haringey | Great Northern | AAP | 3 | 1873 | D | 51.5983°N 0.1197°W | Wood Green |
| Anerley | Bromley | London Overground | ANZ | 4 | 1839 | E | 51.4125°N 0.0651°W | Anerley |
| Balham | Wandsworth | Southern | BAL | 3 | 1863 | C | 51.4426°N 0.1520°W | Balham |
| Banstead | Reigate and Banstead^{out-boundary} | Southern | BAD | 6 | 1865 | F | 51.3292°N 0.2132°W | Banstead |
| Barking | Barking and Dagenham | c2c | BKG | 4 | 1854 | B | 51.5393°N 0.0817°E | Barking |
| Barking Riverside | Barking and Dagenham | London Overground | BGV | 4 | 2022 | | 51.5191°N 0.1147°E | Barking |
| Barnehurst | Bexley | Southeastern | BNH | 6 | 1895 | C | 51.4648°N 0.1595°E | Barnehurst |
| Barnes | Richmond upon Thames | South Western Railway | BNS | 3 | 1846 | C | 51.4671°N 0.2420°W | Barnes |
| Barnes Bridge | Richmond upon Thames | South Western Railway | BNI | 3 | 1916 | C | 51.4722°N 0.2523°W | Barnes |
| Battersea Park | Wandsworth | Southern | BAK | 2 | 1865 | D | 51.4779°N 0.1477°W | Battersea |
| Beckenham Hill | Lewisham | Thameslink | BEC | 4 | 1892 | E | 51.4246°N 0.0161°W | Downham |
| Beckenham Junction | Bromley | Southeastern | BKJ | 4 | 1857 | C | 51.4109°N 0.0257°W | Beckenham |
| Bellingham | Lewisham | Southeastern | BGM | 3 | 1892 | E | 51.4342°N 0.0199°W | Bellingham |
| Belmont | Sutton | Southern | BLM | 5 | 1865 | F | 51.3440°N 0.1986°W | Belmont |
| Belvedere | Bexley | Southeastern | BVD | 5 | 1859 | E | 51.4927°N 0.1524°E | Belvedere |
| Berrylands | Kingston upon Thames | South Western Railway | BRS | 5 | 1933 | E | 51.3988°N 0.2803°W | Berrylands |
| Bethnal Green | Tower Hamlets | London Overground | BET | 2 | 1872 | F | 51.5230°N 0.0595°W | Bethnal Green |
| Bexley | Bexley | Southeastern | BXY | 6 | 1866 | D | 51.4403°N 0.1479°E | Bexley |
| Bexleyheath | Bexley | Southeastern | BXH | 5 | 1895 | C | 51.4635°N 0.1338°E | Bexleyheath |
| Bickley | Bromley | Southeastern | BKL | 5 | 1858 | D | 51.3995°N 0.0441°E | Bickley |
| Birkbeck | Bromley | Southern | BIK | 4 | 1930 | F | 51.4039°N 0.0568°W | Anerley |
| Blackfriars^{London} | City of London | Thameslink | BFR | 1 | 1886 | A | 51.5116°N 0.1030°W | Blackfriars |
| Blackheath | Lewisham | Southeastern | BKH | 3 | 1849 | C | 51.4663°N 0.0064°E | Blackheath |
| Blackhorse Road | Waltham Forest | London Underground | BHO | 3 | 1894 | E | 51.5866°N 0.0416°W | Walthamstow |
| Bond Street | Westminster | Elizabeth line | BDS | 1 | 2022 | | 51.5142°N 0.1485°W | Mayfair |
| Bowes Park | Haringey | Great Northern | BOP | 3/4 | 1880 | E | 51.6078°N 0.1209°W | Bowes Park |
| Brent Cross West | Barnet | Thameslink | BCZ | 3 | 2023 | | 51.5687°N 0.2269°W | Brent Cross |
| Brentford | Hounslow | South Western Railway | BFD | 4 | 1849 | E | 51.4875°N 0.3096°W | Brentford |
| Brimsdown | Enfield | Greater Anglia | BMD | 5 | 1884 | E | 51.6556°N 0.0301°W | Brimsdown |
| Brixton | Lambeth | Southeastern | BRX | 2 | 1862 | E | 51.4629°N 0.1132°W | Brixton |
| Brockley | Lewisham | London Overground | BCY | 2 | 1871 | D | 51.4645°N 0.0369°W | Brockley |
| Bromley North | Bromley | Southeastern | BMN | 4 | 1878 | D | 51.4088°N 0.0179°E | Bromley |
| Bromley South | Bromley | Southeastern | BMS | 5 | 1858 | B | 51.4004°N 0.0181°E | Bromley |
| Brondesbury | Brent | London Overground | BSY | 2 | 1860 | E | 51.5451°N 0.2020°W | Brondesbury |
| Brondesbury Park | Brent | London Overground | BSP | 2 | 1904 | E | 51.5407°N 0.2103°W | Brondesbury |
| Bruce Grove | Haringey | London Overground | BCV | 3 | 1872 | E | 51.5940°N 0.0704°W | Tottenham |
| Bush Hill Park | Enfield | London Overground | BHK | 5 | 1880 | D | 51.6418°N 0.0691°W | Bush Hill Park |
| Caledonian Road & Barnsbury | Islington | London Overground | CIR | 2 | 1850 | E | 51.5432°N 0.1145°W | Barnsbury |
| Cambridge Heath | Tower Hamlets | London Overground | CBH | 2 | 1872 | F | 51.5321°N 0.0572°W | Cambridge Heath |
| Camden Road | Camden | London Overground | CMD | 2 | 1870 | D | 51.5444°N 0.1401°W | Camden Town |
| Canada Water | Southwark | London Underground | ZCW | 2 | 1999 | unlisted | 51.4983°N 0.0500°W | Canada Water |
| Canary Wharf | Tower Hamlets | Elizabeth line | CWX | 2 | 2022 | unlisted | 51.5061°N 0.0158°W | Canary Wharf |
| Cannon Street^{London} | City of London | Network Rail | CST | 1 | 1866 | A | 51.5101°N 0.0912°W | City of London |
| Canonbury | Islington | London Overground | CNN | 2 | 1869 | F | 51.5482°N 0.0925°W | Canonbury |
| Carshalton | Sutton | Southern | CSH | 5 | 1868 | D | 51.3686°N 0.1659°W | Carshalton |
| Carshalton Beeches | Sutton | Southern | CSB | 5 | 1906 | E | 51.3577°N 0.1714°W | Carshalton |
| Castle Bar Park | Ealing | Great Western Railway | CBP | 4 | 1906 | E | 51.5228°N 0.3323°W | West Ealing |
| Caterham | Tandridge^{out-boundary} | Southern | CAT | 6 | 1856 | D | 51.2821°N 0.0783°W | Caterham |
| Catford | Lewisham | Southeastern | CTF | 3 | 1892 | D | 51.4447°N 0.0261°W | Catford |
| Catford Bridge | Lewisham | Southeastern | CFB | 3 | 1857 | D | 51.4446°N 0.0250°W | Catford |
| Chadwell Heath | Redbridge | Elizabeth line | CTH | 5 | 1864 | C | 51.5678°N 0.1292°E | Chadwell Heath |
| Charing Cross^{London} | Westminster | Network Rail | CHX | 1 | 1864 | A | 51.5075°N 0.1231°W | Charing Cross |
| Charlton | Greenwich | Southeastern | CTN | 3 | 1849 | D | 51.4868°N 0.0310°E | Charlton |
| Cheam | Sutton | Southern | CHE | 5 | 1844 | D | 51.3560°N 0.2147°W | Cheam |
| Chelsfield | Bromley | Southeastern | CLD | 6 | 1868 | D | 51.3565°N 0.1076°E | Chelsfield |
| Chessington North | Kingston upon Thames | South Western Railway | CSN | 6 | 1939 | D | 51.3642°N 0.3005°W | Chessington |
| Chessington South | Kingston upon Thames | South Western Railway | CSS | 6 | 1939 | E | 51.3569°N 0.3080°W | Chessington |
| Chingford | Waltham Forest | London Overground | CHI | 5 | 1873 | C | 51.6331°N 0.0094°E | Chingford |
| Chipstead | Reigate and Banstead^{out-boundary} | Southern | CHP | 6 | 1899 | E | 51.3093°N 0.1693°W | Chipstead |
| Chislehurst | Bromley | Southeastern | CIT | 5 | 1865 | D | 51.4057°N 0.0573°E | Chislehurst |
| Chiswick | Hounslow | South Western Railway | CHK | 3 | 1849 | E | 51.4813°N 0.2683°W | Chiswick |
| City Thameslink^{London} | City of London | Thameslink | CTK | 1 | 1990 | C | 51.5163°N 0.1037°W | City of London |
| Clapham High Street | Lambeth | London Overground | CLP | 2 | 1866 | F | 51.4658°N 0.1328°W | Clapham |
| Clapham Junction | Wandsworth | South Western Railway | CLJ | 2 | 1863 | B | 51.4644°N 0.1703°W | Battersea |
| Clapton | Hackney | London Overground | CPT | 2/3 | 1873 | D | 51.5617°N 0.0571°W | Clapton |
| Clock House | Bromley | Southeastern | CLK | 4 | 1864 | D | 51.4088°N 0.0411°W | Beckenham |
| Coulsdon South | Croydon | Southern | CDS | 6 | 1889 | D | 51.3157°N 0.1380°W | Coulsdon |
| Coulsdon Town | Croydon | Southern | CDN | 6 | 1904 | E | 51.3219°N 0.1340°W | Coulsdon |
| Crayford | Bexley | Southeastern | CRY | 6 | 1866 | D | 51.4483°N 0.1786°E | Crayford |
| Crews Hill | Enfield | Great Northern | CWH | 6 | 1910 | F | 51.6845°N 0.1072°W | Crews Hill |
| Cricklewood | Barnet | Thameslink | CRI | 3 | 1868 | E | 51.5586°N 0.2129°W | Cricklewood |
| Crofton Park | Lewisham | Southeastern | CFT | 3 | 1892 | E | 51.4550°N 0.0367°W | Crofton Park |
| Crouch Hill | Islington | London Overground | CRH | 3 | 1868 | E | 51.5720°N 0.1171°W | Stroud Green |
| Crystal Palace | Bromley | London Overground | CYP | 3/4 | 1854 | D | 51.4182°N 0.0726°W | Crystal Palace |
| Custom House | Newham | Elizabeth line | CUS | 3 | 2022 | unlisted | 51.5096°N 0.0259°E | Custom House |
| Dagenham Dock | Barking and Dagenham | c2c | DDK | 5 | 1908 | E | 51.5268°N 0.1450°E | Dagenham Dock |
| Dalston Junction | Hackney | London Overground | DLJ | 2 | 2010^{c} | unlisted | 51.5453°N 0.0747°W | Dalston |
| Dalston Kingsland | Hackney | London Overground | DLK | 2 | 1983 | D | 51.5482°N 0.0763°W | Dalston |
| Denmark Hill | Southwark | Thameslink | DMK | 2 | 1866 | D | 51.4683°N 0.0894°W | Denmark Hill |
| Deptford | Lewisham | Southeastern | DEP | 2 | 1836 | E | 51.4788°N 0.0265°W | Deptford |
| Drayton Green | Ealing | Great Western Railway | DRG | 4 | 1905 | F | 51.5165°N 0.3300°W | West Ealing |
| Drayton Park | Islington | Great Northern | DYP | 2 | 1904 | E | 51.5528°N 0.1055°W | Highbury |
| Ealing Broadway | Ealing | Elizabeth line | EAL | 3 | 1838 | C | 51.5147°N 0.3017°W | Ealing |
| Earlsfield | Wandsworth | South Western Railway | EAD | 3 | 1884 | D | 51.4424°N 0.1877°W | Earlsfield |
| East Croydon | Croydon | Southern | ECR | 5 | 1841 | B | 51.3753°N 0.0930°W | Croydon |
| East Dulwich | Southwark | Southern | EDW | 2 | 1868 | E | 51.4616°N 0.0804°W | East Dulwich |
| Eden Park | Bromley | Southeastern | EDN | 5 | 1882 | E | 51.3900°N 0.0262°W | Eden Park |
| Edmonton Green | Enfield | London Overground | EDR | 4 | 1872 | C | 51.6242°N 0.0614°W | Edmonton |
| Elephant & Castle | Southwark | Thameslink | EPH | 1/2 | 1862 | E | 51.4938°N 0.0986°W | Newington |
| Elmers End | Bromley | Southeastern | ELE | 4 | 1864 | D | 51.3981°N 0.0496°W | Elmers End |
| Elmstead Woods | Bromley | Southeastern | ESD | 4 | 1904 | D | 51.4168°N 0.0441°E | Elmstead |
| Elstree & Borehamwood | Hertsmere^{out-boundary} | Thameslink | ELS | 6 | 1868 | E | 51.6531°N 0.2802°W | Borehamwood |
| Eltham | Greenwich | Southeastern | ELW | 4 | 1895 | C | 51.4555°N 0.0515°E | Eltham |
| Emerson Park | Havering | London Overground | EMP | 6 | 1909 | F | 51.5687°N 0.2204°E | Emerson Park |
| Enfield Chase | Enfield | Great Northern | ENC | 5 | 1910 | D | 51.6529°N 0.0908°W | Enfield |
| Enfield Lock | Enfield | Greater Anglia | ENL | 6 | 1855 | E | 51.6709°N 0.0284°W | Enfield Lock |
| Enfield Town | Enfield | London Overground | ENF | 5 | 1849 | C | 51.6516°N 0.0792°W | Enfield |
| Epsom Downs | Epsom and Ewell^{out-boundary} | Southern | EPD | 6 | 1865 | F | 51.3237°N 0.2389°W | Epsom Downs |
| Erith | Bexley | Southeastern | ERH | 6 | 1849 | E | 51.4816°N 0.1754°E | Erith |
| Essex Road | Islington | Great Northern | EXR | 2 | 1904 | E | 51.5406°N 0.0963°W | Canonbury |
| Euston^{London} | Camden | Network Rail | EUS | 1 | 1837 | A | 51.5287°N 0.1345°W | Camden |
| Ewell East | Epsom and Ewell^{out-boundary} | Southern | EWE | 6 | 1847 | E | 51.3451°N 0.2419°W | Ewell |
| Ewell West | Epsom and Ewell^{out-boundary} | South Western Railway | EWW | 6 | 1859 | C | 51.3502°N 0.2569°W | Ewell |
| Falconwood | Bexley | Southeastern | FCN | 4 | 1936 | D | 51.4592°N 0.0799°E | Falconwood |
| Farringdon | Islington | London Underground | ZFD | 1 | 1863 | E | 51.5206°N 0.1053°W | Clerkenwell |
| Feltham | Hounslow | South Western Railway | FEL | 6 | 1848 | C | 51.4481°N 0.4088°W | Feltham |
| Fenchurch Street^{London} | City of London | c2c | FST | 1 | 1841 | A | 51.5114°N 0.0783°W | City of London |
| Finchley Road & Frognal | Camden | London Overground | FNY | 2 | 1860 | E | 51.5499°N 0.1837°W | Frognal |
| Finsbury Park | Islington | Great Northern | FPK | 2 | 1861 | C | 51.5647°N 0.1064°W | Finsbury Park |
| Forest Gate | Newham | Elizabeth line | FOG | 3 | 1839 | C | 51.5494°N 0.0242°E | Forest Gate |
| Forest Hill | Lewisham | London Overground | FOH | 3 | 1839 | C | 51.4393°N 0.0533°W | Forest Hill |
| Fulwell | Richmond upon Thames | South Western Railway | FLW | 6 | 1864 | E | 51.4334°N 0.3508°W | Fulwell |
| Gidea Park | Havering | Elizabeth line | GDP | 6 | 1910 | C | 51.5820°N 0.2063°E | Gidea Park |
| Gipsy Hill | Lambeth | Southern | GIP | 3 | 1856 | E | 51.4246°N 0.0840°W | Gipsy Hill |
| Goodmayes | Redbridge | Elizabeth line | GMY | 4 | 1901 | C | 51.5655°N 0.1109°E | Goodmayes |
| Gordon Hill | Enfield | Great Northern | GDH | 5 | 1910 | D | 51.6632°N 0.0943°W | Gordon Hill |
| Gospel Oak | Camden | London Overground | GPO | 2 | 1860 | D | 51.5552°N 0.1514°W | Gospel Oak |
| Grange Park | Enfield | Great Northern | GPK | 5 | 1910 | E | 51.6431°N 0.0969°W | Grange Park |
| Greenford | Ealing | London Underground | GFD | 4 | 1904 | unlisted | 51.5426°N 0.3463°W | Greenford |
| Greenwich | Greenwich | Southeastern | GNW | 2/3 | 1836 | D | 51.4782°N 0.0134°W | Greenwich |
| Grove Park | Lewisham | Southeastern | GRP | 4 | 1871 | C | 51.4306°N 0.0219°E | Grove Park |
| Gunnersbury | Hounslow | London Underground | GUN | 3 | 1869 | D | 51.4918°N 0.2750°W | Gunnersbury |
| Hackbridge | Sutton | Southern | HCB | 4 | 1868 | E | 51.3778°N 0.1539°W | Hackbridge |
| Hackney Central | Hackney | London Overground | HKC | 2 | 1980^{c} | D | 51.5470°N 0.0559°W | Hackney |
| Hackney Downs | Hackney | London Overground | HAC | 2 | 1872 | C | 51.5483°N 0.0601°W | Hackney |
| Hackney Wick | Tower Hamlets | London Overground | HKW | 2 | 1980 | E | 51.5432°N 0.0249°W | Hackney Wick |
| Hadley Wood | Enfield | Great Northern | HDW | 6 | 1885 | E | 51.6688°N 0.1761°W | Hadley Wood |
| Haggerston | Hackney | London Overground | HGG | 2 | 2010^{c} | unlisted | 51.5381°N 0.0736°W | Haggerston |
| Hampstead Heath | Camden | London Overground | HDH | 2 | 1860 | D | 51.5553°N 0.1654°W | Hampstead |
| Hampton | Richmond upon Thames | South Western Railway | HMP | 6 | 1864 | C | 51.4159°N 0.3717°W | Hampton |
| Hampton Court | Elmbridge^{out-boundary} | South Western Railway | HMC | 6 | 1849 | C | 51.4028°N 0.3425°W | Molesey |
| Hampton Wick | Richmond upon Thames | South Western Railway | HMW | 6 | 1863 | D | 51.4141°N 0.3107°W | Hampton Wick |
| Hanwell | Ealing | Elizabeth line | HAN | 4 | 1839b | E | 51.5116°N 0.3389°W | Hanwell |
| Harlesden | Brent | London Underground | HDN | 3 | 1912 | E | 51.5363°N 0.2581°W | Harlesden |
| Harold Wood | Havering | Elizabeth line | HRO | 6 | 1868 | C | 51.5928°N 0.2343°E | Harold Wood |
| Harringay | Haringey | Great Northern | HGY | 3 | 1865 | D | 51.5770°N 0.1052°W | Harringay |
| Harringay Green Lanes | Haringey | London Overground | HRY | 3 | 1880 | E | 51.5774°N 0.0977°W | Harringay |
| Harrow & Wealdstone | Harrow | London Underground | HRW | 5 | 1837 | C | 51.5921°N 0.3347°W | Wealdstone |
| Harrow-on-the-Hill | Harrow | London Underground | HOH | 5 | 1880 | unlisted | 51.5794°N 0.3370°W | Harrow |
| Hatch End | Harrow | London Overground | HTE | 6 | 1844 | E | 51.6097°N 0.3682°W | Hatch End |
| Haydons Road | Merton | Thameslink | HYR | 3 | 1868 | E | 51.4255°N 0.1880°W | Summerstown |
| Hayes | Bromley | Southeastern | HYS | 5 | 1882 | D | 51.3765°N 0.0102°E | Hayes |
| Hayes & Harlington | Hillingdon | Elizabeth line | HAY | 5 | 1864 | D | 51.5031°N 0.4203°W | Hayes |
| Headstone Lane | Harrow | London Overground | HDL | 5 | 1917 | E | 51.6019°N 0.3566°W | Headstone |
| Heathrow Central | Hillingdon | Heathrow Express | HXX | 6 | 1999 | unlisted | 51.4710°N 0.4540°W | Heathrow Airport |
| Heathrow Terminal 4 | Hillingdon | Heathrow Express | HAF | 6 | 1999 | unlisted | 51.4580°N 0.4450°W | Heathrow Airport |
| Heathrow Terminal 5 | Hillingdon | Heathrow Express | HWV | 6 | 2008 | unlisted | 51.4723°N 0.4880°W | Heathrow Airport |
| Hendon | Barnet | Thameslink | HEN | 3/4 | 1868 | E | 51.5800°N 0.2389°W | Hendon |
| Herne Hill | Lambeth | Southeastern | HNH | 2/3 | 1862 | C | 51.4533°N 0.1021°W | Herne Hill |
| Highams Park | Waltham Forest | London Overground | HIP | 4 | 1873 | C | 51.6084°N 0.0001°W | Highams Park |
| Highbury & Islington | Islington | London Underground | HHY | 2 | 1872 | C/F^{e} | 51.5458°N 0.1050°W | Highbury |
| Hither Green | Lewisham | Southeastern | HGR | 3 | 1866 | C | 51.4519°N 0.0008°W | Hither Green |
| Homerton | Hackney | London Overground | HMN | 2 | 1868 | E | 51.5470°N 0.0431°W | Homerton |
| Honor Oak Park | Lewisham | London Overground | HPA | 3 | 1886 | D | 51.4501°N 0.0456°W | Honor Oak |
| Hornsey | Haringey | Great Northern | HRN | 3 | 1850 | D | 51.5862°N 0.1116°W | Hornsey |
| Hounslow | Hounslow | South Western Railway | HOU | 5 | 1849 | D | 51.4620°N 0.3622°W | Hounslow |
| Hoxton | Hackney | London Overground | HOX | 1/2 | 2010 | unlisted | 51.5318°N 0.0754°W | Hoxton |
| Ilford | Redbridge | Elizabeth line | IFD | 4 | 1839 | C | 51.5586°N 0.0696°E | Ilford |
| Imperial Wharf | Hammersmith and Fulham | London Overground | IMW | 2 | 2009 | E | 51.4751°N 0.1828°W | Sands End |
| Isleworth | Hounslow | South Western Railway | ISL | 4 | 1850 | F | 51.4749°N 0.3370°W | Isleworth |
| Kenley | Croydon | Southern | KLY | 6 | 1856 | E | 51.3246°N 0.1007°W | Kenley |
| Kensal Green | Brent | London Underground | KNL | 2 | 1916 | E | 51.5306°N 0.2243°W | Kensal Green |
| Kensal Rise | Brent | London Overground | KNR | 2 | 1873 | E | 51.5345°N 0.2204°W | Kensal Green |
| Kensington (Olympia) | Kensington and Chelsea | London Overground | KPA | 2 | 1864 | C | 51.4985°N 0.2110°W | Kensington |
| Kent House | Bromley | Southeastern | KTH | 4 | 1884 | D | 51.4123°N 0.0453°W | Beckenham |
| Kentish Town | Camden | London Underground | KTN | 2 | 1868 | F | 51.5505°N 0.1396°W | Kentish Town |
| Kentish Town West | Camden | London Overground | KTW | 2 | 1860 | E | 51.5468°N 0.1468°W | Kentish Town |
| Kenton | Brent | London Underground | KNT | 4 | 1912 | E | 51.5818°N 0.3167°W | Kenton |
| Kew Bridge | Hounslow | South Western Railway | KWB | 3 | 1849 | F | 51.4895°N 0.2878°W | Brentford |
| Kew Gardens | Richmond upon Thames | London Underground | KWG | 3/4 | 1870 | D | 51.4772°N 0.2849°W | Kew |
| Kidbrooke | Greenwich | Southeastern | KDB | 3 | 1895 | D | 51.4621°N 0.0273°E | Kidbrooke |
| Kilburn High Road | Camden | London Overground | KBN | 2 | 1852 | E | 51.5373°N 0.1925°W | Kilburn |
| King's Cross^{London} | Camden | Network Rail | KGX | 1 | 1852 | A | 51.5324°N 0.1233°W | Kings Cross |
| Kingston | Kingston upon Thames | South Western Railway | KNG | 6 | 1845 | C | 51.4129°N 0.3019°W | Kingston upon Thames |
| Kingswood | Reigate and Banstead^{out-boundary} | Southern | KND | 6 | 1897 | E | 51.2950°N 0.2110°W | Kingswood |
| Knockholt | Bromley | Southeastern | KCK | 6 | 1876 | E | 51.3459°N 0.1307°E | Chelsfield |
| Ladywell | Lewisham | Southeastern | LAD | 3 | 1857 | E | 51.4562°N 0.0192°W | Ladywell |
| Lea Bridge | Waltham Forest | Greater Anglia | LEB | 3 | 2016^{c} | unknown | 51.5665°N 0.0366°W | Lea Bridge |
| Lee | Lewisham | Southeastern | LEE | 3 | 1866 | D | 51.4497°N 0.0128°E | Lee |
| Lewisham | Lewisham | Southeastern | LEW | 2/3 | 1849 | C | 51.4658°N 0.0141°W | Lewisham |
| Leyton Midland Road | Waltham Forest | London Overground | LEM | 3 | 1894 | E | 51.5693°N 0.0072°W | Leyton |
| Leytonstone High Road | Waltham Forest | London Overground | LER | 3 | 1894 | E | 51.5634°N 0.0073°E | Leytonstone |
| Limehouse | Tower Hamlets | c2c | LHS | 2 | 1840 | E | 51.5126°N 0.0402°W | Limehouse |
| Liverpool Street^{London} | City of London | Network Rail | LST | 1 | 1874 | A | 51.5185°N 0.0819°W | Bishopsgate |
| London Bridge^{London} | Southwark | Network Rail | LBG | 1 | 1836 | A | 51.5053°N 0.0851°W | Southwark |
| London Fields | Hackney | London Overground | LOF | 2 | 1872 | F | 51.5407°N 0.0577°W | London Fields |
| Loughborough Junction | Lambeth | Thameslink | LGJ | 2 | 1864 | E | 51.4661°N 0.1020°W | Brixton |
| Lower Sydenham | Lewisham | Southeastern | LSY | 4 | 1857 | E | 51.4245°N 0.0336°W | Sydenham |
| Malden Manor | Kingston upon Thames | South Western Railway | MAL | 4 | 1938 | E | 51.3847°N 0.2618°W | Old Malden |
| Manor Park | Newham | Elizabeth line | MNP | 3/4 | 1872 | C | 51.5526°N 0.0463°E | Manor Park |
| Maryland | Newham | Elizabeth line | MYL | 3 | 1874 | D | 51.5460°N 0.0059°E | Maryland |
| Meridian Water | Enfield | Greater Anglia | MRW | 4 | 2019 | ?? | 51.6083°N 0.0509°W | Upper Edmonton |
| Marylebone^{London} | Westminster | Chiltern Railways | MYB | 1 | 1899 | A | 51.5231°N 0.1630°W | Marylebone |
| Maze Hill | Greenwich | Southeastern | MZH | 3 | 1873 | D | 51.4830°N 0.0032°E | Maze Hill |
| Mill Hill Broadway | Barnet | Thameslink | MIL | 4 | 1868 | D | 51.6128°N 0.2491°W | Mill Hill |
| Mitcham Eastfields | Merton | Southern | MTC | 3 | 2008 | E | 51.4077°N 0.1547°W | Mitcham |
| Mitcham Junction | Merton | Southern | MIJ | 4 | 1868 | E | 51.3930°N 0.1576°W | Mitcham |
| Moorgate^{London} | City of London | London Underground | MOG | 1 | 1865 | E | 51.5187°N 0.0896°W | Moorgate |
| Morden South | Merton | Thameslink | MDS | 4 | 1930 | F | 51.3965°N 0.1990°W | Morden |
| Mortlake | Richmond upon Thames | South Western Railway | MTL | 3 | 1846 | C | 51.4682°N 0.2672°W | Mortlake |
| Motspur Park | Merton | South Western Railway | MOT | 4 | 1938 | C | 51.3958°N 0.2397°W | Motspur Park |
| Mottingham | Greenwich | Southeastern | MTG | 4 | 1866 | D | 51.4401°N 0.0504°E | Mottingham |
| New Barnet | Barnet | Great Northern | NBA | 5 | 1857 | D | 51.6488°N 0.1738°W | New Barnet |
| New Beckenham | Bromley | Southeastern | NBC | 4 | 1857 | E | 51.4164°N 0.0348°W | Beckenham |
| New Cross | Lewisham | Southeastern | NWX | 2 | 1850 | C | 51.4760°N 0.0325°W | New Cross |
| New Cross Gate | Lewisham | London Overground | NXG | 2 | 1839 | C | 51.4752°N 0.0406°W | New Cross |
| New Eltham | Greenwich | Southeastern | NEH | 4 | 1878 | C | 51.4380°N 0.0705°E | New Eltham |
| New Malden | Kingston upon Thames | South Western Railway | NEM | 4 | 1838 | C | 51.4039°N 0.2560°W | New Malden |
| New Southgate | Barnet | Great Northern | NSG | 4 | 1850 | E | 51.6142°N 0.1432°W | New Southgate |
| Norbiton | Kingston upon Thames | South Western Railway | NBT | 5 | 1869 | C | 51.4124°N 0.2838°W | Norbiton |
| Norbury | Croydon | Southern | NRB | 3 | 1878 | C | 51.4114°N 0.1214°W | Norbury |
| North Dulwich | Southwark | Southern | NDL | 2/3 | 1868 | E | 51.4543°N 0.0887°W | Dulwich |
| Northolt Park | Ealing | Chiltern Railways | NLT | 5 | 1926 | E | 51.5574°N 0.3595°W | Northolt |
| North Sheen | Richmond upon Thames | South Western Railway | NSH | 3 | 1930 | E | 51.4656°N 0.2865°W | Richmond |
| Northumberland Park | Haringey | Greater Anglia | NUM | 3 | 1840 | E | 51.5986°N 0.0551°W | Northumberland Park |
| North Wembley | Brent | London Underground | NWB | 4 | 1912 | E | 51.5627°N 0.3040°W | North Wembley |
| Norwood Junction | Croydon | London Overground | NWD | 4 | 1841 | C | 51.3971°N 0.0749°W | South Norwood |
| Nunhead | Southwark | Southeastern | NHD | 2 | 1865 | E | 51.4671°N 0.0527°W | Nunhead |
| Oakleigh Park | Barnet | Great Northern | OKL | 4 | 1873 | D | 51.6379°N 0.1667°W | Oakleigh Park |
| Old Street^{London} | Islington | London Underground | OLD | 1 | 1901 | E | 51.5258°N 0.0850°W | St Luke's |
| Orpington | Bromley | Southeastern | ORP | 6 | 1868 | C | 51.3741°N 0.0885°E | Orpington |
| Paddington^{London} | Westminster | Network Rail | PAD | 1 | 1838 | A | 51.5171°N 0.1769°W | Paddington |
| Palmers Green | Enfield | Great Northern | PAL | 4 | 1871 | C | 51.6184°N 0.1102°W | Palmers Green |
| Peckham Rye | Southwark | Southern | PMR | 2 | 1864 | D | 51.4701°N 0.0691°W | Peckham |
| Penge East | Bromley | Southeastern | PNE | 4 | 1862 | D | 51.4191°N 0.0537°W | Penge |
| Penge West | Bromley | London Overground | PNW | 4 | 1839 | E | 51.4174°N 0.0606°W | Penge |
| Petts Wood | Bromley | Southeastern | PET | 5 | 1928 | C | 51.3889°N 0.0742°E | Petts Wood |
| Plumstead | Greenwich | Southeastern | PLU | 4 | 1849 | D | 51.4897°N 0.0844°E | Plumstead |
| Ponders End | Enfield | Greater Anglia | PON | 5 | 1840 | C | 51.6420°N 0.0349°W | Ponders End |
| Purley | Croydon | Southern | PUR | 6 | 1841 | C | 51.3377°N 0.1135°W | Purley |
| Purley Oaks | Croydon | Southern | PUO | 6 | 1899 | D | 51.3469°N 0.0987°W | South Croydon |
| Putney | Wandsworth | South Western Railway | PUT | 2/3 | 1844 | C | 51.4611°N 0.2162°W | Putney |
| Queen's Park | Brent | London Underground | QPW | 2 | 1879 | C | 51.5341°N 0.2053°W | Queens Park |
| Queens Road Peckham | Southwark | Southern | QRP | 2 | 1866 | E | 51.4736°N 0.0573°W | Peckham |
| Queenstown Road (Battersea) | Wandsworth | South Western Railway | QRB | 2 | 1877 | F | 51.4748°N 0.1470°W | Battersea |
| Rainham | Havering | c2c | RNM | 6 | 1854 | C | 51.5169°N 0.1905°E | Rainham |
| Ravensbourne | Bromley | Southeastern | RVB | 4 | 1892 | E | 51.4141°N 0.0075°W | Beckenham |
| Raynes Park | Merton | South Western Railway | RAY | 4 | 1838 | C | 51.4094°N 0.2299°W | Raynes Park |
| Rectory Road | Hackney | London Overground | REC | 2 | 1872 | E | 51.5584°N 0.0681°W | West Hackney |
| Reedham | Croydon | Southern | RHM | 6 | 1911 | E | 51.3313°N 0.1233°W | Purley |
| Richmond | Richmond upon Thames | South Western Railway | RMD | 4 | 1846 | B | 51.4630°N 0.3014°W | Richmond |
| Riddlesdown | Croydon | Southern | RDD | 6 | 1927 | E | 51.3323°N 0.0996°W | Riddlesdown |
| Romford | Havering | Elizabeth line | RMF | 6 | 1839 | C | 51.5749°N 0.1827°E | Romford |
| Rotherhithe | Southwark | London Overground | ROE | 2 | 1869 | unlisted | 51.5008°N 0.0522°W | Rotherhithe |
| St Helier | Merton | Thameslink | SIH | 4 | 1930 | F | 51.3901°N 0.1985°W | St Helier |
| St James Street | Waltham Forest | London Overground | SJS | 3 | 1870 | D | 51.5810°N 0.0323°W | Walthamstow |
| St Johns | Lewisham | Southeastern | SAJ | 2 | 1849 | E | 51.4691°N 0.0225°W | St Johns |
| St Margarets | Richmond upon Thames | South Western Railway | SMG | 4 | 1876 | C | 51.4550°N 0.3204°W | St Margarets |
| St Mary Cray | Bromley | Southeastern | SMY | 6 | 1858 | C | 51.3947°N 0.1058°E | St Mary Cray |
| St Pancras^{London} | Camden | Network Rail/Eurostar | STP | 1 | 1868 | A/C^{d} | 51.5314°N 0.1261°W | St Pancras |
| Sanderstead | Croydon | Southern | SNR | 6 | 1884 | D | 51.3484°N 0.0940°W | Sanderstead |
| Selhurst | Croydon | Southern | SRS | 4 | 1865 | D | 51.3921°N 0.0883°W | Selhurst |
| Seven Kings | Redbridge | Elizabeth line | SVK | 4 | 1899 | C | 51.5635°N 0.0969°E | Seven Kings |
| Seven Sisters | Haringey | London Overground | SVS | 3 | 1872 | D | 51.5839°N 0.0756°W | Seven Sisters |
| Shadwell | Tower Hamlets | London Overground | SDE | 2 | 1876 | unlisted | 51.5112°N 0.0569°W | Shadwell |
| Shepherd's Bush | Hammersmith and Fulham | London Overground | SPB | 2 | 2008 | D | 51.5051°N 0.2175°W | Shepherds Bush |
| Shoreditch High Street | Hackney and Tower Hamlets | London Overground | SDC | 1 | 2010 | unlisted | 51.5234°N 0.0768°W | Shoreditch |
| Shortlands | Bromley | Southeastern | SRT | 4 | 1858 | D | 51.4058°N 0.0019°E | Shortlands |
| Sidcup | Bexley | Southeastern | SID | 5 | 1866 | C | 51.4338°N 0.1040°E | Sidcup |
| Silver Street | Enfield | London Overground | SLV | 4 | 1872 | D | 51.6149°N 0.0676°W | Edmonton |
| Slade Green | Bexley | Southeastern | SGR | 6 | 1866 | E | 51.4678°N 0.1904°E | Slade Green |
| South Acton | Ealing | London Overground | SAT | 3 | 1880 | E | 51.4994°N 0.2707°W | Acton |
| Southall | Ealing | Elizabeth line | STL | 4 | 1839 | D | 51.5060°N 0.3783°W | Southall |
| South Bermondsey | Southwark | Southern | SBM | 2 | 1866 | E | 51.4887°N 0.0548°W | South Bermondsey |
| Southbury | Enfield | London Overground | SBU | 5 | 1891 | E | 51.6488°N 0.0524°W | Enfield |
| South Croydon | Croydon | Southern | SCY | 5 | 1865 | D | 51.3629°N 0.0933°W | South Croydon |
| South Greenford | Ealing | Great Western Railway | SGN | 4 | 1903 | F | 51.5342°N 0.3369°W | Greenford |
| South Hampstead | Camden | London Overground | SOH | 2 | 1879 | E | 51.5414°N 0.1788°W | South Hampstead |
| South Kenton | Brent | London Underground | SOK | 4 | 1933 | E | 51.5703°N 0.3086°W | South Kenton |
| South Merton | Merton | Thameslink | SMO | 4 | 1930 | F | 51.4030°N 0.2062°W | Morden |
| South Ruislip | Hillingdon | Chiltern Railways | SRU | 5 | 1908 | F | 51.5569°N 0.3988°W | South Ruislip |
| South Tottenham | Haringey | London Overground | STO | 3 | 1871 | E | 51.5802°N 0.0720°W | South Tottenham |
| Stamford Hill | Haringey | London Overground | SMH | 3 | 1872 | E | 51.5749°N 0.0761°W | Stamford Hill |
| Stoke Newington | Hackney | London Overground | SKW | 2 | 1872 | E | 51.5651°N 0.0727°W | Stoke Newington |
| Stonebridge Park | Brent | London Underground | SBP | 3 | 1912 | D | 51.5440°N 0.2754°W | Tokyngton |
| Stoneleigh | Epsom and Ewell^{out-boundary} | South Western Railway | SNL | 5 | 1932 | C | 51.3637°N 0.2487°W | Stoneleigh |
| Stratford | Newham | Elizabeth line | SRA | 2/3 | 1839 | B | 51.5417°N 0.0037°W | Stratford |
| Stratford International | Newham | Southeastern | SFA | | 2009 | unlisted | 51.5448°N 0.0087°W | Stratford |
| Strawberry Hill | Richmond upon Thames | South Western Railway | STW | 5 | 1873 | C | 51.4389°N 0.3388°W | Strawberry Hill |
| Streatham | Lambeth | Southern | STE | 3 | 1856 | D | 51.4260°N 0.1311°W | Streatham |
| Streatham Common | Lambeth | Southern | SRC | 3 | 1862 | C | 51.4187°N 0.1359°W | Streatham Common |
| Streatham Hill | Lambeth | Southern | SRH | 3 | 1856 | C | 51.4380°N 0.1271°W | Streatham |
| Sudbury & Harrow Road | Brent | Chiltern Railways | SUD | 4 | 1910 | F | 51.5540°N 0.3167°W | Sudbury |
| Sudbury Hill Harrow | Harrow | Chiltern Railways | SDH | 4 | 1910 | F | 51.5589°N 0.3358°W | Harrow on the hill |
| Sundridge Park | Bromley | Southeastern | SUP | 4 | 1878 | E | 51.4137°N 0.0221°E | Sundridge Park |
| Surbiton | Kingston upon Thames | South Western Railway | SUR | 6 | 1838 | B | 51.3926°N 0.3044°W | Surbiton |
| Surrey Quays | Southwark | London Overground | SQE | 2 | 1884 | unlisted | 51.4933°N 0.0477°W | Surrey Quays |
| Sutton | Sutton | Southern | SUO | 5 | 1847 | C | 51.3601°N 0.1903°W | Sutton |
| Sutton Common | Sutton | Thameslink | SUC | 4 | 1930 | F | 51.3751°N 0.1964°W | Sutton |
| Sydenham | Lewisham | London Overground | SYD | 3 | 1839 | D | 51.4268°N 0.0545°W | Sydenham |
| Sydenham Hill | Southwark | Southeastern | SYH | 3 | 1862 | E | 51.4326°N 0.0802°W | Sydenham Hill |
| Syon Lane | Hounslow | South Western Railway | SYL | 4 | 1925 | F | 51.4818°N 0.3248°W | Isleworth |
| Tadworth | Reigate and Banstead^{out-boundary} | Southern | TAD | 6 | 1900 | E | 51.2920°N 0.2360°W | Tadworth |
| Tattenham Corner | Reigate and Banstead^{out-boundary} | Southern | TAT | 6 | 1901 | E | 51.3092°N 0.2426°W | Tattenham Corner |
| Teddington | Richmond upon Thames | South Western Railway | TED | 6 | 1864 | C | 51.4247°N 0.3325°W | Teddington |
| Thames Ditton | Elmbridge^{out-boundary} | South Western Railway | THD | 6 | 1849 | D | 51.3886°N 0.3383°W | Thames Ditton |
| Thornton Heath | Croydon | Southern | TTH | 4 | 1862 | C | 51.3985°N 0.1004°W | Thornton Heath |
| Tolworth | Kingston upon Thames | South Western Railway | TOL | 5 | 1938 | E | 51.3771°N 0.2793°W | Tolworth |
| Tooting | Merton | Thameslink | TOO | 3 | 1868 | E | 51.4196°N 0.1603°W | Tooting |
| Tottenham Court Road | Camden | Elizabeth line | TCR | 1 | 2022 | unlisted | 51.5162°N 0.1309°W | St Giles |
| Tottenham Hale | Haringey | Greater Anglia | TOM | 3 | 1840 | D | 51.5902°N 0.0611°W | Tottenham Hale |
| Tulse Hill | Lambeth | Southern | TUH | 3 | 1868 | D | 51.4399°N 0.1049°W | Tulse Hill |
| Turkey Street | Enfield | London Overground | TUR | 6 | 1891 | E | 51.6725°N 0.0474°W | Bullsmoor |
| Twickenham | Richmond upon Thames | South Western Railway | TWI | 5 | 1848 | C | 51.4504°N 0.3296°W | Twickenham |
| Upminster | Havering | c2c | UPM | 6 | 1885 | C | 51.5588°N 0.2509°E | Upminster |
| Upper Holloway | Islington | London Overground | UHL | 2 | 1868 | E | 51.5638°N 0.1298°W | Upper Holloway |
| Upper Warlingham | Tandridge^{out-boundary} | Southern | UWL | 6 | 1884 | D | 51.3085°N 0.0780°W | Whyteleafe |
| Vauxhall^{London} | Lambeth | South Western Railway | VXH | 1/2 | 1848 | B | 51.4859°N 0.1229°W | Vauxhall |
| Victoria^{London} | Westminster | Network Rail | VIC | 1 | 1862 | A | 51.4966°N 0.1448°W | Belgravia |
| Waddon | Croydon | Southern | WDO | 5 | 1847 | D | 51.3674°N 0.1170°W | Waddon |
| Wallington | Sutton | Southern | WLT | 5 | 1847 | C | 51.3592°N 0.1533°W | Wallington |
| Walthamstow Central | Waltham Forest | London Overground | WHC | 3 | 1869 | C | 51.5831°N 0.0192°W | Walthamstow |
| Walthamstow Queen's Road | Waltham Forest | London Overground | WMW | 3 | 1894 | E | 51.5817°N 0.0240°W | Walthamstow |
| Wandsworth Common | Wandsworth | Southern | WSW | 3 | 1895 | D | 51.4464°N 0.1635°W | Wandsworth |
| Wandsworth Road | Lambeth | London Overground | WWR | 2 | 1863 | F | 51.4702°N 0.1390°W | Clapham |
| Wandsworth Town | Wandsworth | South Western Railway | WNT | 2 | 1846 | C | 51.4610°N 0.1879°W | Wandsworth |
| Wanstead Park | Newham | London Overground | WNP | 3 | 1894 | E | 51.5518°N 0.0264°E | Forest Gate |
| Wapping | Tower Hamlets | London Overground | WPE | 2 | 1869 | unlisted | 51.5044°N 0.0558°W | Wapping |
| Waterloo^{London} | Lambeth | Network Rail | WAT | 1 | 1848 | A | 51.5031°N 0.1132°W | Waterloo |
| Waterloo East^{London} | Lambeth | Southeastern | WAE | 1 | 1869 | B | 51.5041°N 0.1101°W | Waterloo |
| Welling | Bexley | Southeastern | WLI | 4 | 1895 | C | 51.4647°N 0.1017°E | Welling |
| Wembley Central | Brent | London Underground | WMB | 4 | 1842 | C | 51.5519°N 0.2964°W | Wembley |
| Wembley Stadium | Brent | Chiltern Railways | WCX | 4 | 1906 | F | 51.5543°N 0.2863°W | Wembley |
| West Brompton | Kensington and Chelsea | London Underground | WBP | 2 | 1869 | E | 51.4866°N 0.1957°W | West Brompton |
| Westcombe Park | Greenwich | Southeastern | WCB | 3 | 1879 | D | 51.4842°N 0.0187°E | Westcombe Park |
| West Croydon | Croydon | London Overground | WCY | 5 | 1839 | C | 51.3785°N 0.1020°W | Croydon |
| West Drayton | Hillingdon | Elizabeth line | WDT | 6 | 1838 | E | 51.5101°N 0.4719°W | West Drayton |
| West Dulwich | Southwark | Southeastern | WDU | 3 | 1862 | E | 51.4409°N 0.0906°W | Dulwich |
| West Ealing | Ealing | Elizabeth line | WEA | 3 | 1871 | E | 51.5137°N 0.3203°W | West Ealing |
| West Ham | Newham | London Underground | WEH | 3 | 1901 | C | 51.5284°N 0.0066°E | West Ham |
| West Hampstead | Camden | London Overground | WHD | 2 | 1888 | D | 51.5473°N 0.1913°W | West Hampstead |
| West Hampstead Thameslink | Camden | Thameslink | WHP | 2 | 1871 | E | 51.5485°N 0.1918°W | West Hampstead |
| West Norwood | Lambeth | Southern | WNW | 3 | 1856 | D | 51.4318°N 0.1035°W | West Norwood |
| West Ruislip | Hillingdon | Chiltern Railways | WRU | 6 | 1906 | F | 51.5696°N 0.4376°W | Ruislip |
| West Sutton | Sutton | Thameslink | WSU | 5 | 1930 | E | 51.3662°N 0.2051°W | Sutton |
| West Wickham | Bromley | Southeastern | WWI | 5 | 1882 | D | 51.3813°N 0.0145°W | West Wickham |
| Whitechapel | Tower Hamlets | London Underground | ZLW | 2 | 1876 | unlisted | 51.5190°N 0.0610°W | Whitechapel |
| White Hart Lane | Haringey | London Overground | WHL | 3 | 1872 | E | 51.6049°N 0.0711°W | Tottenham |
| Whitton | Richmond upon Thames | South Western Railway | WTN | 5 | 1930 | C | 51.4495°N 0.3578°W | Whitton |
| Whyteleafe | Tandridge^{out-boundary} | Southern | WHY | 6 | 1900 | E | 51.3097°N 0.0811°W | Whyteleafe |
| Whyteleafe South | Tandridge^{out-boundary} | Southern | WHS | 6 | 1856 | E | 51.3034°N 0.0768°W | Whyteleafe |
| Willesden Junction | Brent | London Overground | WIJ | 2/3 | 1866 | C | 51.5324°N 0.2439°W | Harlesden |
| Wimbledon | Merton | South Western Railway | WIM | 3 | 1838 | B | 51.4232°N 0.2043°W | Wimbledon |
| Wimbledon Chase | Merton | Thameslink | WBO | 3 | 1930 | F | 51.4095°N 0.2142°W | Wimbledon |
| Winchmore Hill | Enfield | Great Northern | WIH | 4 | 1871 | D | 51.6341°N 0.1013°W | Winchmore Hill |
| Woodgrange Park | Newham | London Overground | WGR | 3/4 | 1894 | E | 51.5487°N 0.0454°E | Manor Park |
| Woodmansterne | Croydon | Southern | WME | 6 | 1904 | E | 51.3192°N 0.1539°W | Coulsdon |
| Wood Street | Waltham Forest | London Overground | WST | 4 | 1873 | D | 51.5864°N 0.0021°W | Walthamstow |
| Woolwich | Greenwich | Elizabeth line | WWC | 4 | 2022 | unlisted | 51.4916°N 0.0718°E | Woolwich |
| Woolwich Arsenal | Greenwich | Southeastern | WWA | 4 | 1849 | C | 51.4898°N 0.0694°E | Woolwich |
| Woolwich Dockyard | Greenwich | Southeastern | WWD | 3 | 1849 | E | 51.4913°N 0.0536°E | Woolwich |
| Worcester Park | Sutton | South Western Railway | WCP | 4 | 1859 | C | 51.3804°N 0.2412°W | Worcester Park |

== Busiest stations by yearly passenger traffic ==
Based on 2024-25 Total passenger entry and exit statistics
| Rank | Station | Yearly passengers |
|---|---|---|
| 1 | London Liverpool Street | 98,016,000 |
| 2 | London Waterloo | 70,390,000 |
| 3 | London Paddington | 69,897,000 |
| 4 | Tottenham Court Road | 68,134,000 |
| 5 | London Bridge | 54,686,000 |
| 6 | London Victoria | 53,784,000 |
| 7 | Stratford | 51,474,000 |
| 8 | Farringdon | 50,171,000 |
| 9 | Bond Street | 42,752,000 |
| 10 | London Euston | 40,249,000 |
| 11 | London St Pancras International | 38,843,000 |
| 12 | Whitechapel | 37,141,000 |
| 13 | London King's Cross | 27,727,000 |
| 14 | Clapham Junction | 24,448,000 |
| 15 | Highbury & Islington | 23,983,000 |
| 16 | East Croydon | 20,592,000 |
| 17 | London Charing Cross | 19,768,000 |
| 18 | Canada Water | 18,669,000 |
| 19 | Canary Wharf | 15,928,000 |
| 20 | London Vauxhall | 15,534,000 |
| 21 | Ealing Broadway | 15,457,000 |
| 22 | London Blackfriars | 15,193,000 |
| 23 | Woolwich | 13,756,000 |
| 24 | Barking | 13,359,000 |
| 25 | Wimbledon | 13,244,000 |

== See also ==
- List of closed railway stations in London
- List of London Underground stations

== Footnotes ==
- ^a members of the London station group
- ^b outside the Greater London boundary
- ^c an earlier station has existed at the location
- ^d domestic and international platforms categorised A; Thameslink platforms categorised C
- ^e Govia Thameslink Railway platforms categorised C; London Overground platforms categorised E
