= Barnes Bridge railway station =

National Rail station in London, England

Barnes Bridge
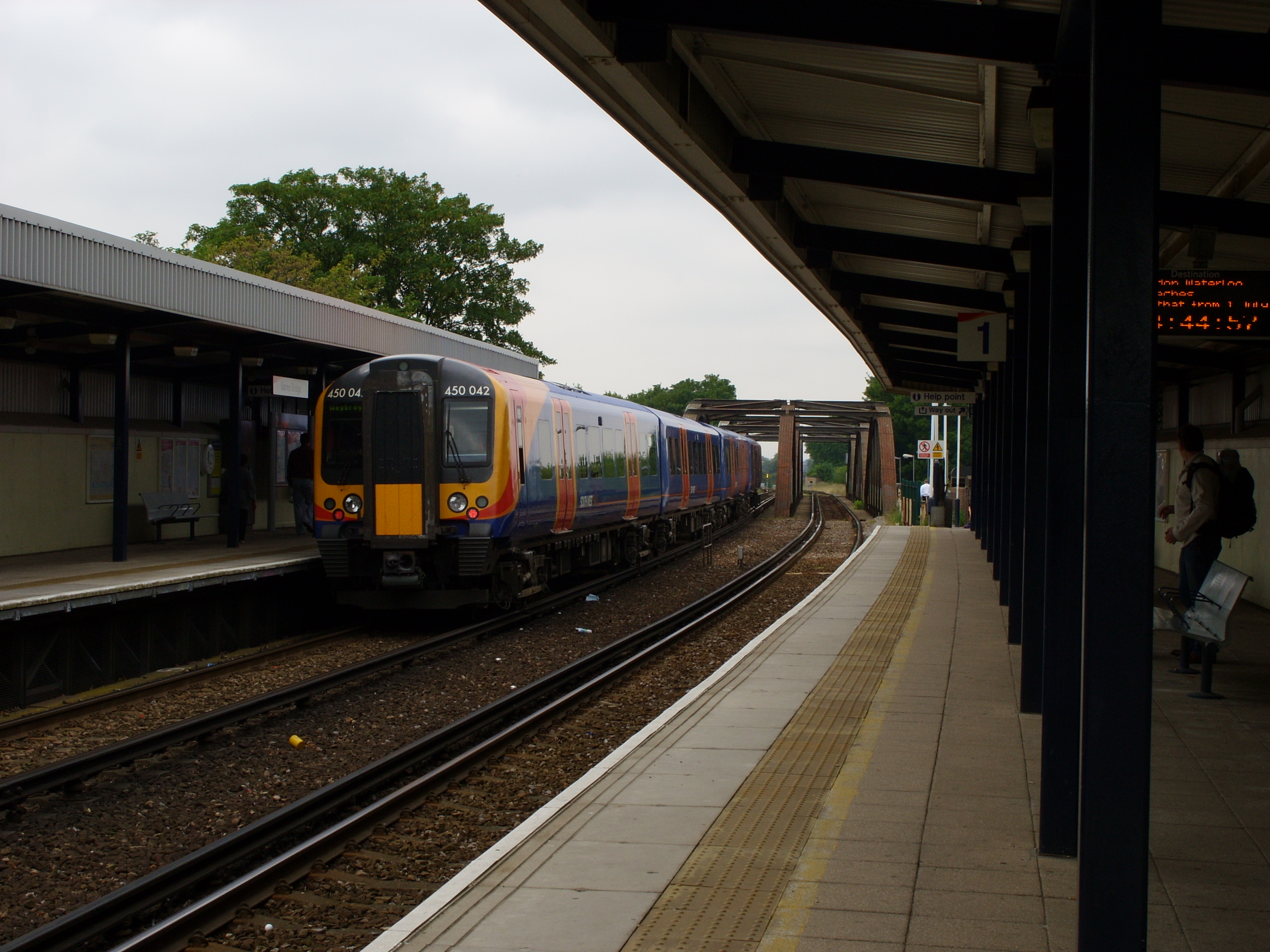
- Interactive map of Barnes Bridge

General information
- Location: Barnes
- Local authority: London Borough of Richmond upon Thames
- Managed by: South Western Railway
- Owner: Network Rail
- Station code: BNI
- DfT category: F1
- Number of platforms: 2
- Fare zone: 3

National Rail annual entry and exit
- 2020–21: ▼0.286 million
- 2021–22: ▲0.604 million
- 2022–23: ▲0.685 million
- 2023–24: ▲0.798 million
- 2024–25: ▲0.872 million

Key dates
- 12 March 1916: Opened

Other information
- External links: Departures; Facilities
- Coordinates: 51.4722°N 0.2523°W

Barnes Bridge railway station, in London fare zone 3, is on The Terrace, Barnes in the London Borough of Richmond upon Thames, in south west London. The station and all trains serving it are operated by South Western Railway. It is on the Hounslow Loop Line, 12 km (7 1/2 miles) south west of London Waterloo.

It was opened on 12 March 1916 on the Surrey side of the River Thames on the embankment leading to Barnes Railway Bridge, from which it takes its name.

The station, which is not wheelchair-accessible, has an ornate entrance facing the river. Stairs lead up to the two platforms, each with a modest shelter. The old ticket office is now used as a physiotherapy clinic.

Barnes Bridge railway station is more central to Barnes than Barnes railway station. Passenger numbers are swelled on Boat Race days.

== Services ==
All services at Barnes Bridge are operated by South Western Railway.

The typical off-peak service in trains per hour is:

- 2 tph to London Waterloo via Barnes
- 2 tph to Weybridge via Hounslow

Additional services, including trains to and from London Waterloo via Richmond call at the station during the peak hours.

On Sundays, the service is reduced to hourly in each direction and westbound trains run to and from Woking instead of Weybridge.

Preceding station	National Rail	Following station
Barnes	South Western Railway Hounslow Loop Line	Chiswick

== Connections ==
London Buses routes 209, 378, 419, 533, mobility route 969 and night route N22 serve the station.
