= Isleworth railway station =

National Rail station in London, England

Isleworth
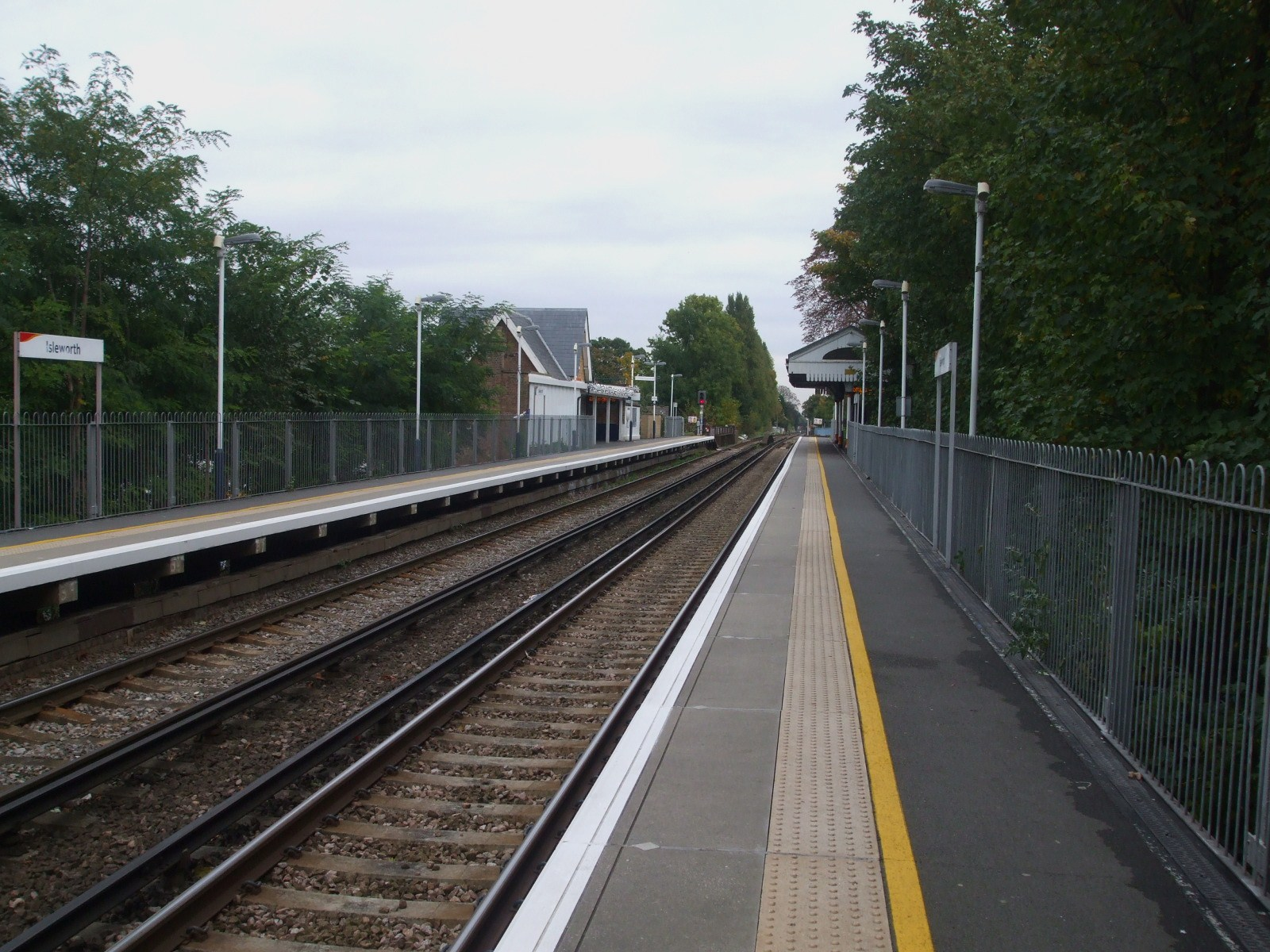
- Interactive map of Isleworth

General information
- Location: Isleworth
- Local authority: London Borough of Hounslow
- Managed by: South Western Railway
- Station code: ISL
- DfT category: F1
- Number of platforms: 2
- Fare zone: 4

National Rail annual entry and exit
- 2020–21: ▼0.368 million
- 2021–22: ▲0.697 million
- 2022–23: ▲0.780 million
- 2023–24: ▲0.878 million
- 2024–25: ▲0.957 million

Railway companies
- Original company: London and South Western Railway
- Pre-grouping: London and South Western Railway
- Post-grouping: Southern Railway

Key dates
- 1 February 1850: Opened as Isleworth
- 1 October 1855: Renamed Isleworth and Spring Grove
- August 1911: Renamed Isleworth for Spring Grove
- ?: Renamed Isleworth

Other information
- External links: Departures; Facilities
- Coordinates: 51.4749°N 0.337°W

Isleworth railway station is located in the London Borough of Hounslow, in west London, and is in London fare zone 4. It is 19 km (12 mi) west-southwest of London Waterloo. The unstaffed station and all trains serving it are operated by South Western Railway.

== History ==
A temporary station east of Wood Lane, 400 metres east-northeast of the current site, opened as "Hounslow" on 22 August 1849 to allow a service to run until the bridges, embankment, and station buildings were completed. The name was changed to "Smallberry Green" after four months. The present station opened on 1 February 1850 as "Isleworth". It was renamed Spring Grove & Isleworth in 1855 and reverted to Isleworth in August 1911.

On 5 May 2023, work began on a £3 million project to improve the station and install lifts to enable step-free access to all platforms. The work is expected to be complete by early 2024.

== Amenities and set-up ==
The two facing platform lengths at Isleworth are constrained by a bridge over a road at each end and front-seven-doors opening is used for most rolling stock. Forerunner 8-car slam door trains fitted the platform lengths, as at two other stations along the line. A commercial street adjoins the station becoming Hounslow High Street within 500 metres, to the west. The more suburban district of Isleworth is primarily south-west of the station, comprising the "Woodlands" or "Worton" estate and a medieval riverside hub of Old Isleworth for which the railway station is the same distance as Syon Lane. Those parts of Isleworth north and east tend to be termed Spring Grove.

== Services ==
All services at Isleworth are operated by South Western Railway.

The typical off-peak service in trains per hour is:

- 2 tph to London Waterloo via Brentford
- 2 tph to Weybridge via Hounslow

Additional services, including trains to and from London Waterloo via Richmond call at the station during the peak hours.

On Sundays, the service is reduced to hourly in each direction and westbound trains run to and from Woking instead of Weybridge.

Preceding station	National Rail	Following station
Syon Lane	South Western Railway Hounslow Loop Line	Hounslow

== Connections ==
London Buses routes 117, 235, 237, E8, H37, and night route N9 serve the station.

== Future ==
Transport for London has proposed opening a new West London Orbital line across West London, which would allow London Overground services to run from Brent Cross West, via Old Oak Common and Isleworth, to Hounslow.
