= London Crosslink =

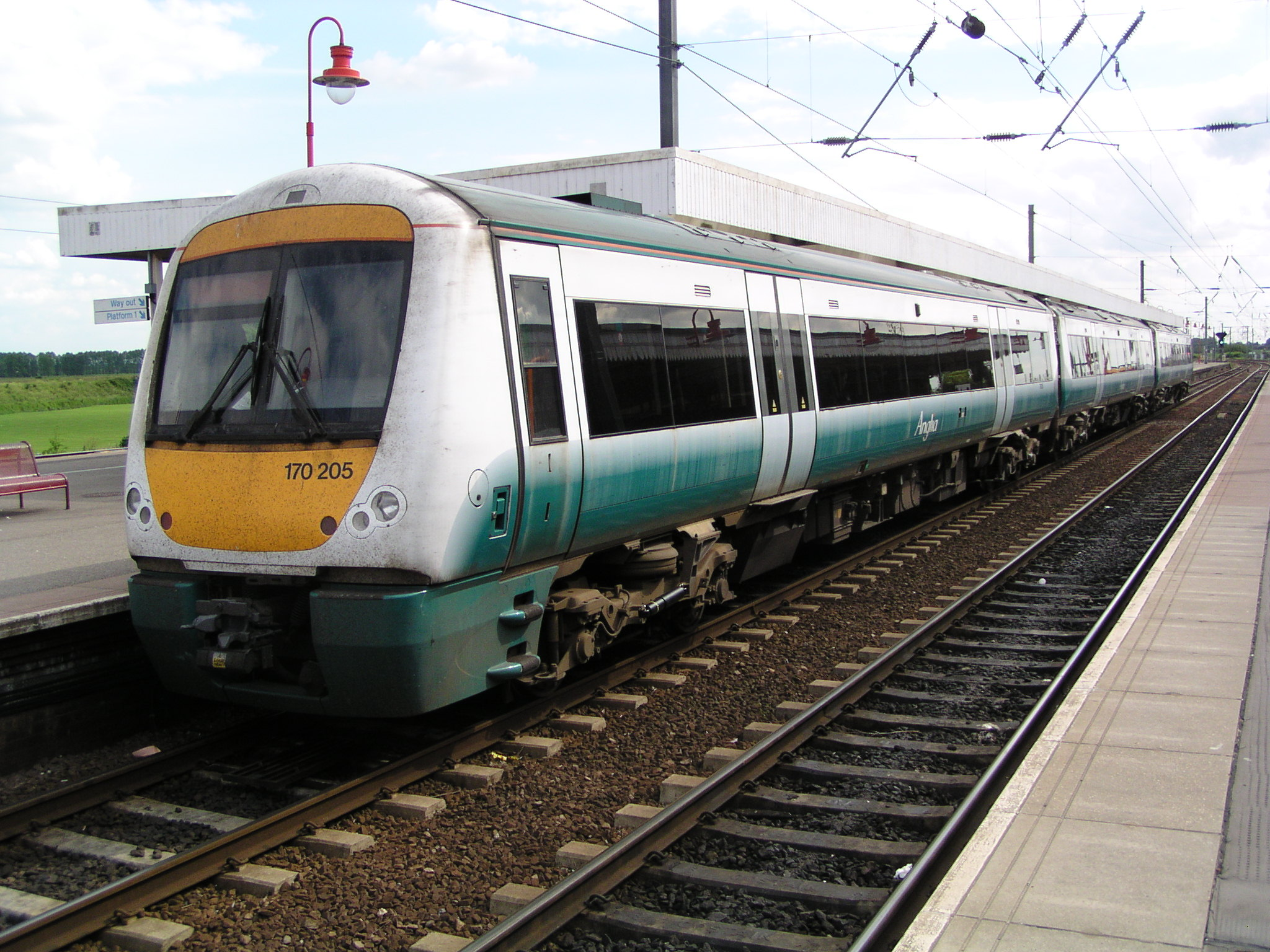

Overview
- Status: Line and stations open, service discontinued.
- Owner: Network Rail
- Locale: East of England
- Termini: Norwich; Basingstoke
- Stations: 19

Service
- Type: Heavy rail
- System: National Rail
- Operator: Anglia Railways
- Rolling stock: Class 170 "Turbostar"

History
- Opened: 22 May 2000
- Closed: 28 September 2002

Technical
- Track gauge: 1,435 mm (4 ft 8 1/2 in) standard gauge
Route map
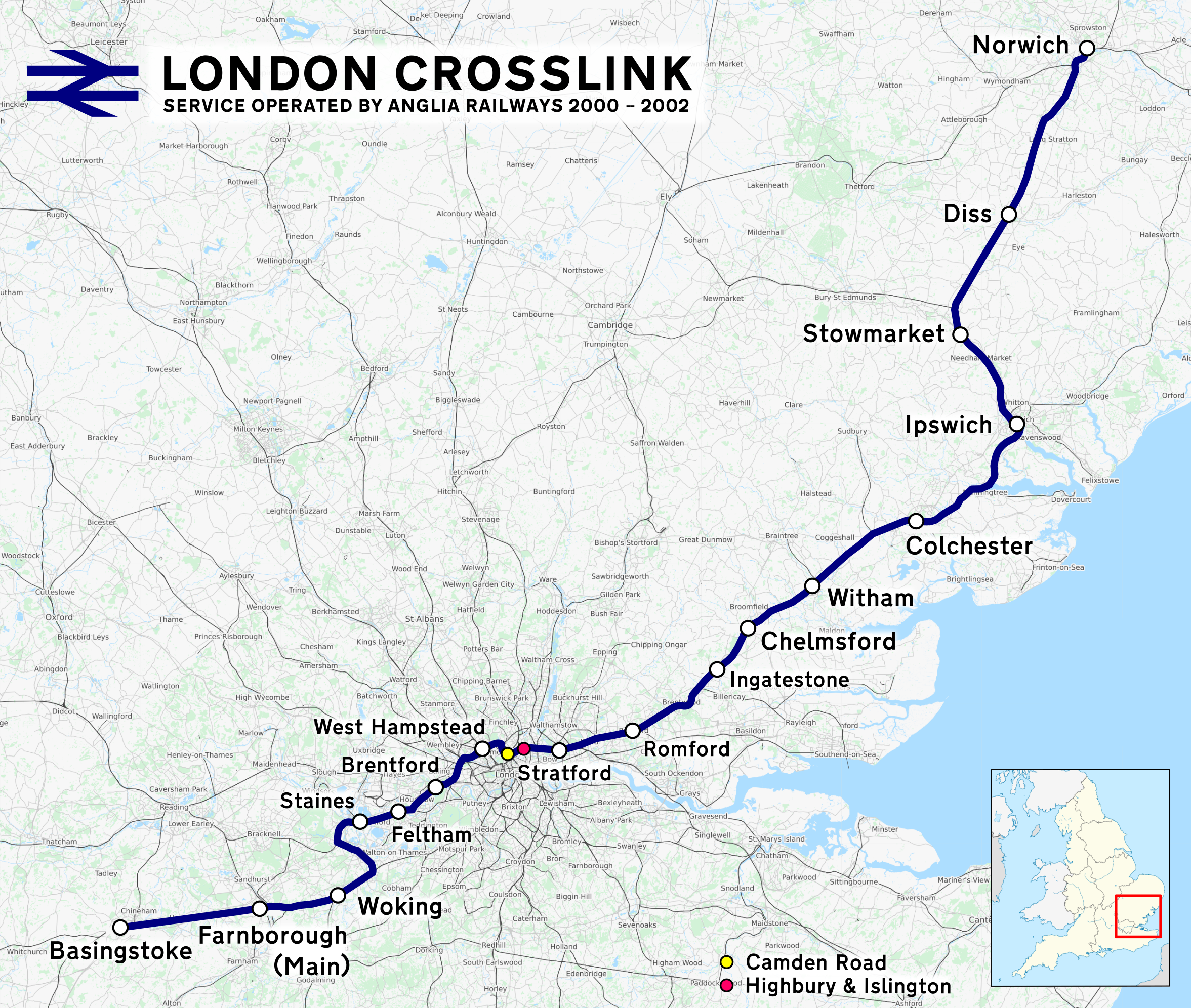
(Click to expand)

London Crosslink was a passenger train service operated by Anglia Railways between Norwich and Basingstoke, using the North London Line to bypass central London. Class 170 Turbostar diesel multiple units were used, and the service operated between 22 May 2000 and 28 September 2002, supported by funding from the Strategic Rail Authority through its Rail Passenger Partnership fund.

== Rolling stock ==
Although the majority of the routes served were electrified (25 kV AC overhead electrified lines on the Anglia route, 750 V DC third rail on the South Western network and dual-voltage on the North London line), diesel trains had to be used as the section of railway from Old Kew Junction to South Acton Junction — i.e. between the Hounslow Loop Line and the North London line — was not electrified.

== Service patterns ==
Due to capacity restrictions on the North London Line, the service only ran infrequently with unequal headways. The majority of services did not go the full length of the route, although all served Basingstoke; Stratford, Chelmsford, Witham, Colchester and Ipswich were all starting or terminating points on the Great Eastern Main Line. Another drawback with the service was the varied stopping patterns employed; for example trains only stopped at Camden Road on weekends, Brentford calls were only made from May 2001 and then only during the morning and evening on weekdays and all-day Sundays, and Romford only received one service per day in the early morning.

There were six daily departures Monday to Saturday and five on Sundays. Below is an extract of the timetable, showing the service offered on weekdays heading eastbound:

Basingstoke	08:27	10:30	12:32	13:42	16:33	18:06
Farnborough	08:40	10:43	12:45	13:54		18:19
Woking	08:51	10:53	12:55	14:04	16:53	18:29
Staines	09:12	11:13	13:14	14:31	17:13	18:54
Feltham	09:19	11:21	13:21	14:37	17:21	19:01
Brentford	09:27					
Willesden Junction					17:29	19:09
West Hampstead	09:58	11:44	13:46	14:59	17:36	19:29
Highbury & Islington	10:13	11:58	14:02	15:14	17:57	19:43
Stratford	10:29	12:15	14:23	15:35	18:14	20:02
Ingatestone		12:36	14:45			
Chelmsford	11:02	12:42	14:51			20:26
Witham		12:51				20:34
Colchester	11:21					20:53
Ipswich						21:12
