= Barnes railway station =

National Rail station in London, England

Barnes
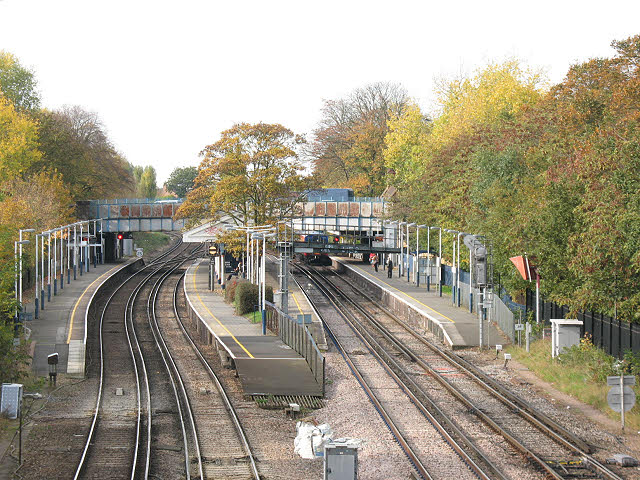
- Interactive map of Barnes

General information
- Location: Barnes
- Local authority: London Borough of Richmond upon Thames
- Managed by: South Western Railway
- Station code: BNS
- DfT category: C2
- Number of platforms: 4
- Fare zone: 3

National Rail annual entry and exit
- 2020–21: ▼0.835 million
- Interchange: ▼3,786
- 2021–22: ▲1.727 million
- Interchange: ▲6,165
- 2022–23: ▲1.905 million
- Interchange: ▲17,391
- 2023–24: ▲2.124 million
- Interchange: ▲22,250
- 2024–25: ▲2.252 million
- Interchange: ▲24,911

Other information
- External links: Departures; Facilities
- Coordinates: 51.4671°N 0.242°W

Designations

Listed Building – Grade II
- Official name: Barnes Station
- Designated: 5 February 1991; 35 years ago
- Reference no.: 1239920

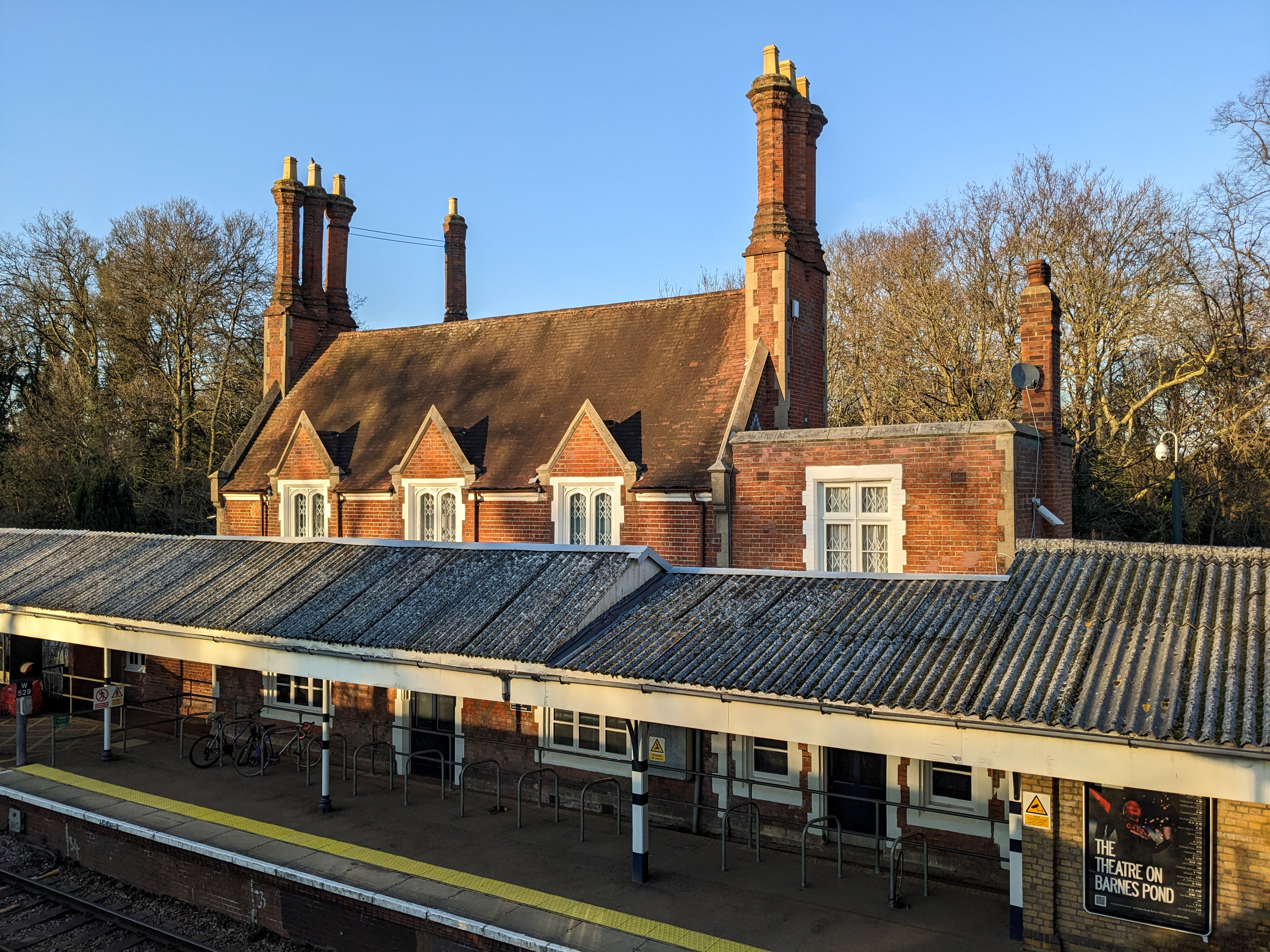
Barnes station building in January 2023, now privately owned

Barnes railway station is a Grade II listed station in the London Borough of Richmond upon Thames, in southwest London, and is in London fare zone 3. It is 7 miles 7 chains (11.4 km) down the line from London Waterloo. The station and all trains serving it are operated by South Western Railway.

It is the nearest station for Queen Mary's Hospital, Roehampton Club, Rosslyn Park F.C. grounds, and the University of Roehampton.

The station is briefly seen at the end of 'Miracle in Crooked Lane', episode five of the third series of Jonathan Creek as well as the following for films: Scream and Scream Again (1970), Somewhere in Camp (1942), Somewhere on Leave (1943) and Terror (1978).

== History ==
The station at Barnes was opened on 27 July 1846, when the line to Richmond was built. When the first section of the Hounslow Loop Line was opened on 22 August 1849, Barnes became a junction station.

Grade II listed, it was designed by the architect John Thomas Emmett in 1846 and is the only survivor of four brick-built Tudor Gothic-style stations on the Richmond branch, the others being Putney, Mortlake, and Richmond. The ticket office, adjacent to Platform 1, is now privately owned.

The Barnes rail crash, in which 13 people were killed and 41 injured, occurred near this station on 2 December 1955.

In 2023, work began to install an accessible footbridge with lifts to enable step-free access to all platforms. and was completed in February 2025.

== Platforms ==
The station has four platforms.

- Platform 1: Local to London Waterloo (Next station Putney)
- Platform 2: Express to London Waterloo (Trains do not generally stop)
- Platform 3: Local to Hounslow (both routes), Teddington via Richmond & Weybridge via Brentford (Next station Mortlake or Barnes Bridge)
- Platform 4: Express to Windsor Riverside & Reading (Trains do not generally stop)

Platforms 1 & 2 are swapped on Sundays. On the London side of the station, there are four tracks; one pair turns off along the Loop Line here.

There are 2 ticket machines by Platform 1. The platforms are accessible by a public footbridge, which connect to the bus stops, Station Road and a path to Roehampton. There are station facilities on the central island, however, these are not often open.

== Services ==
All services at Barnes are operated by South Western Railway.

The typical off-peak service in trains per hour is:

- 4 tph to London Waterloo
- 2 tph to Teddington via Richmond, returning to London Waterloo via Kingston and Wimbledon
- 2 tph to Weybridge via Hounslow

Additional services call at the station during the peak hours.

Preceding station	National Rail	Following station
Putney	South Western Railway Hounslow Loop Line	Barnes Bridge
Putney	South Western Railway Kingston Loop Line	Mortlake

== Connections ==
London Buses routes 33, 265, 419, mobility route 969 and night routes N33 and N72 serve the station.
