= London Buses route 117 =

London bus route

117
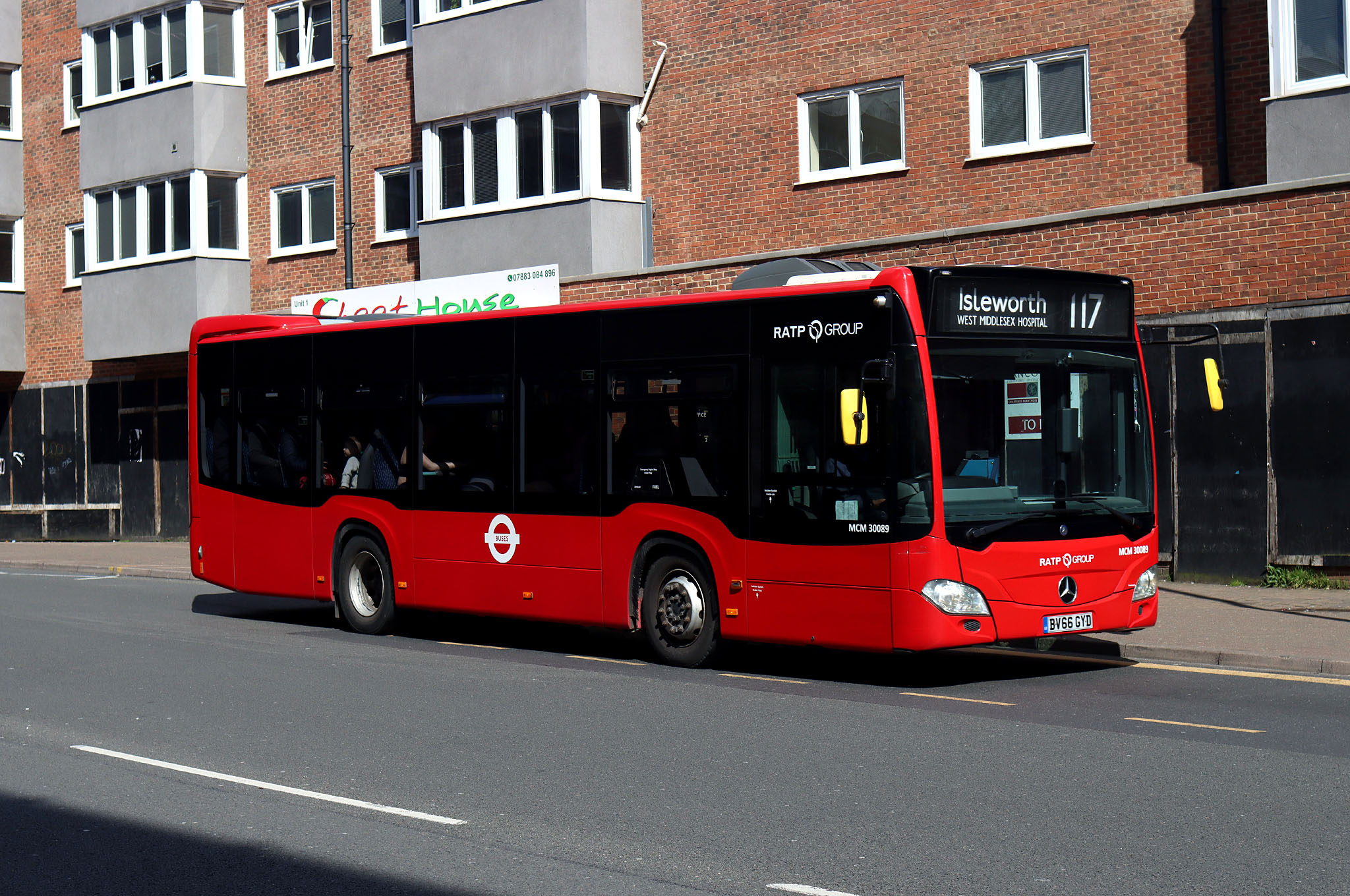
- London United Mercedes-Benz O530 Citaro K in Hounslow in April 2023

Overview
- Operator: London United (First Bus London)
- Garage: Hounslow

Route
- Start: Staines-upon-Thames
- Via: Ashford; Feltham; Hounslow; Isleworth
- End: West Middlesex University Hospital

London Buses route 117 is a Transport for London contracted bus route in London and Surrey, England. Running between Staines-upon-Thames and West Middlesex University Hospital, it is operated by First Bus London subsidiary London United.

== History ==
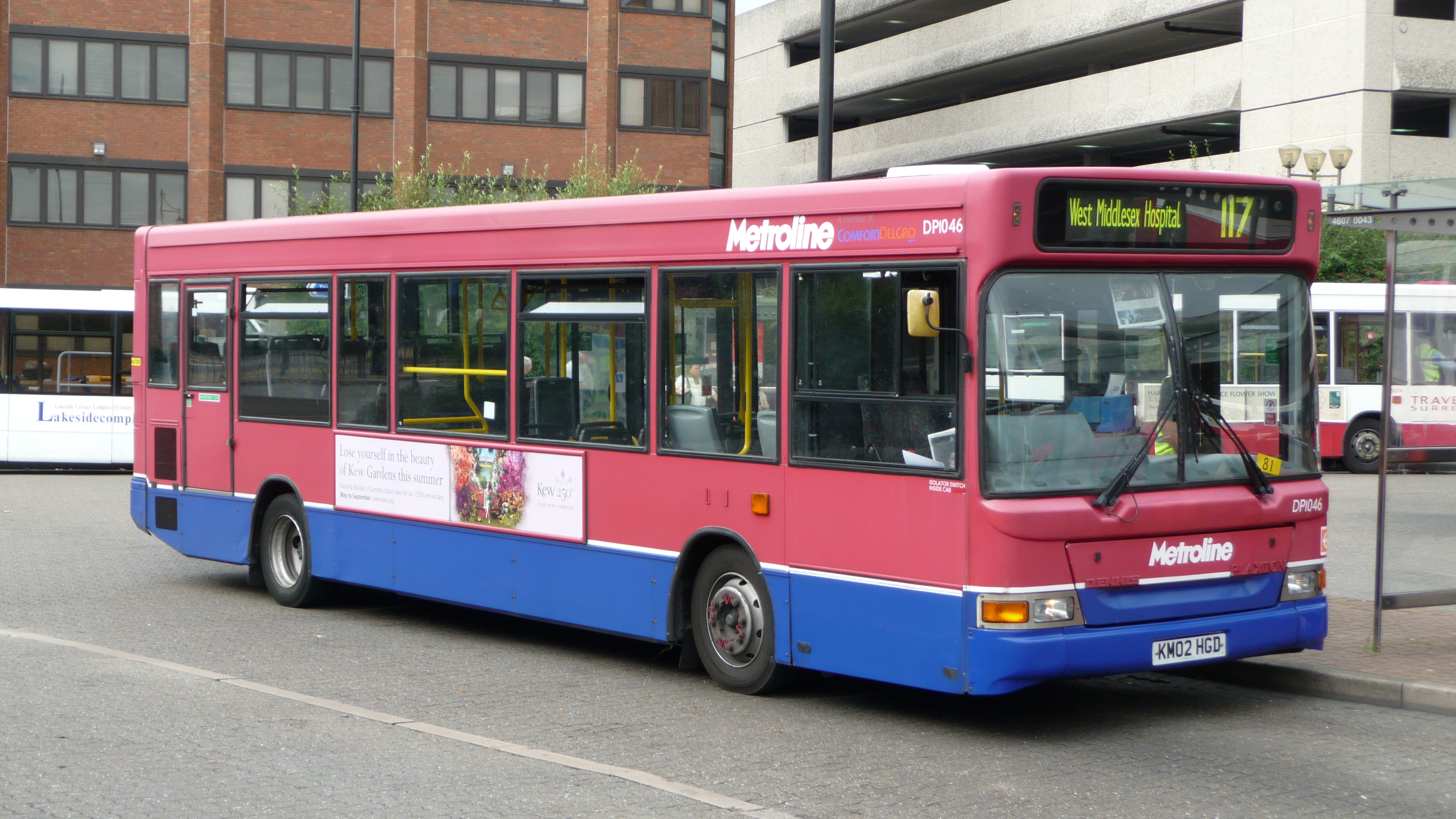
Metroline Plaxton Pointer 2 bodied Dennis Dart SLF at Staines bus station in September 2009

ComfortDelGro in the guise of Metroline bought out Armchair and absorbed them into the bus operation in January 2007 and the remainder of the contract was transferred to them to start from 6 January 2007. They did not however retain the contract when next awarded in September 2011 for 5 years, Abellio was the successful operator using a depot at Twickenham (TF). From October 2016 the contract was awarded to Metroline. It used existing buses as its allocation.

On 28 February 2025, the route passed from London United to First Bus London following the acquisition of RATP Dev Transit London by FirstGroup.

== Current route ==
Route 117 operates via these primary locations:

- Staines-upon-Thames bus station
- Staines station
- Ashford station
- Lower Feltham
- Feltham station
- North Feltham
- Hounslow Heath
- Hounslow bus station
- Isleworth station
- West Middlesex University Hospital
