= Syon Lane railway station =

National Rail station on the Hounslow Loop Line

Syon Lane
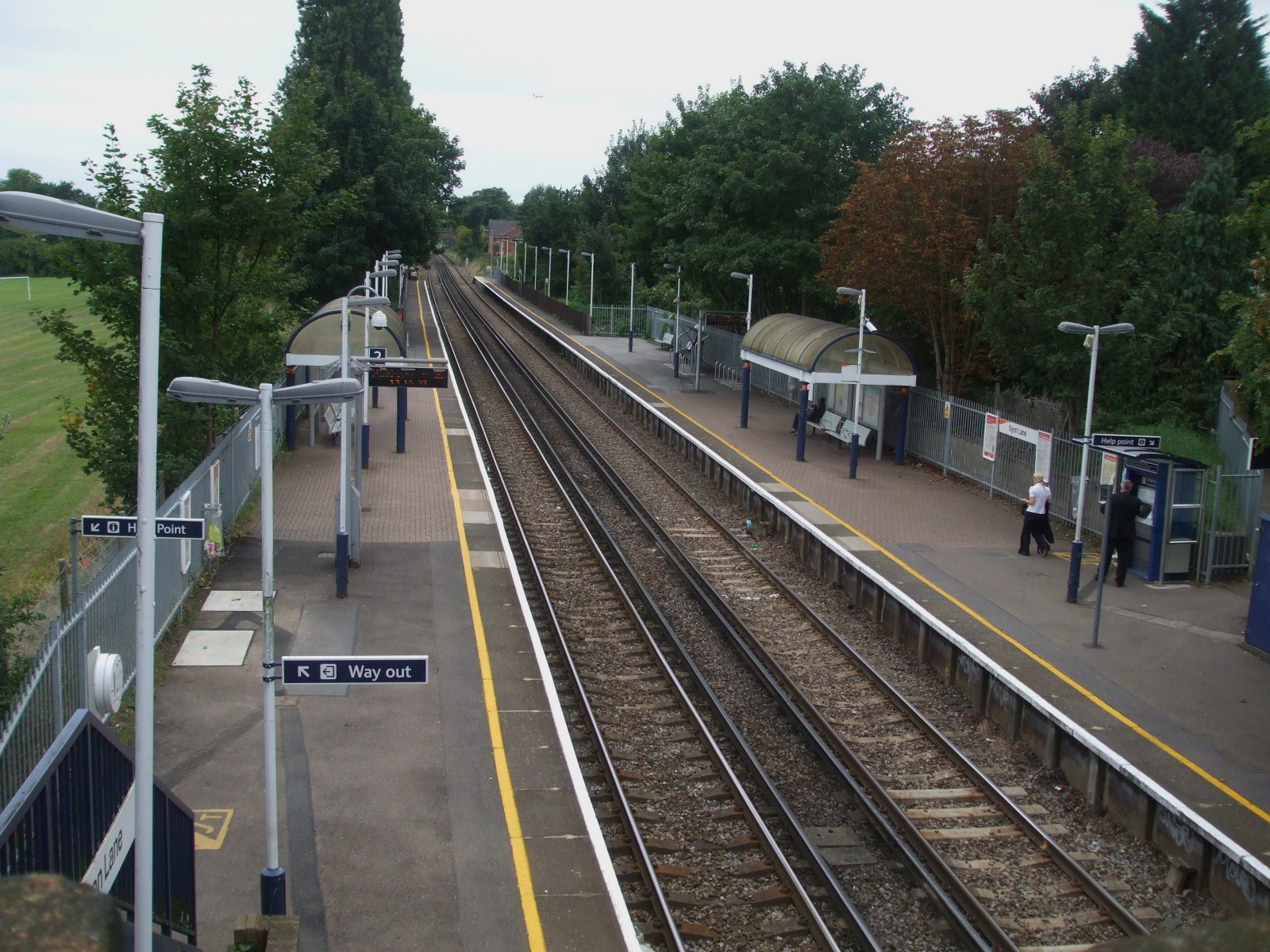
- Interactive map of Syon Lane

General information
- Location: Isleworth
- Local authority: London Borough of Hounslow
- Managed by: South Western Railway
- Owner: Network Rail
- Station code: SYL
- DfT category: F1
- Number of platforms: 2
- Accessible: Yes
- Fare zone: 4
- Cycle parking: Yes

National Rail annual entry and exit
- 2020–21: ▼0.224 million
- 2021–22: ▲0.523 million
- 2022–23: ▲0.668 million
- 2023–24: ▲0.806 million
- 2024–25: ▲0.869 million

Railway companies
- Original company: Southern Railway
- Post-grouping: Southern Railway

Key dates
- 5 July 1931: Station opened
- December 2020: Fully-accessible

Other information
- External links: Departures; Facilities
- Coordinates: 51.4818°N 0.3248°W

Syon Lane railway station in London fare zone 4 is on the Hounslow Loop Line and borders the Spring Grove and New Brentford neighbourhoods of the London Borough of Hounslow in west London. (Note: Spring Grove to the west and New Brentford to the east were formally parts of Isleworth to which they retain administrative and community links. The small triangle of four roads south-east in the TW7 'ISLEWORTH' post town remains by default Isleworth and may be considered by some residents as part of Spring Grove. Syon Park, House and Syon Park Hilton Hotel is centred 800m south-east of the station) The office and light industrial zone to the north-east, the West Cross Centre, has among other businesses the headquarters and studios of broadcaster and entertainment multinational company Sky. The station and all trains serving it are operated by South Western Railway.

== History ==
The Southern Railway opened Syon Lane station 81 years after the line, on 5 July 1931.

In December 2020, South Western Railway finished work to make the station fully accessible. A new footbridge was installed with a lift providing step-free access to the Hounslow-bound platform, with an improved step-free footpath for the Waterloo-bound platform.

=== Lobbying attempts for direct longer-distance and Heathrow Airport services ===
Hounslow Council unsuccessfully proposed that the Hounslow Loop Line be part of the Crossrail route with its inter-regional trains calling at all stations west of Kew Bridge. Planning consultants rejected the proposal in a final route presented to Parliament in 2008. The loop line itself, although partially operating services as a through line to Weybridge in Surrey, is constrained by level crossings on the Windsor and Reading line running from London Waterloo – four in the town of Egham of the 15 in total along the whole main route and its Weybridge spur are concentrated there in quick succession – whose local authority for transport Surrey County Council and Chamber of Commerce object to full-capacity timetabling without tunnelling beneath or bridging over most of the level crossings.

== Amenities and set-up ==
The station is set below steps at the foot of a north–south humpback bridge formed by Syon Lane, which crosses the Great West Road at Gillette Corner 100m north. It has a passenger shelter on each platform (instead of a station building.) A street-level third entrance, from the convergence of Northumberland, Hexham and Rothbury Gardens (streets), connects the eastbound platform.

== Services ==
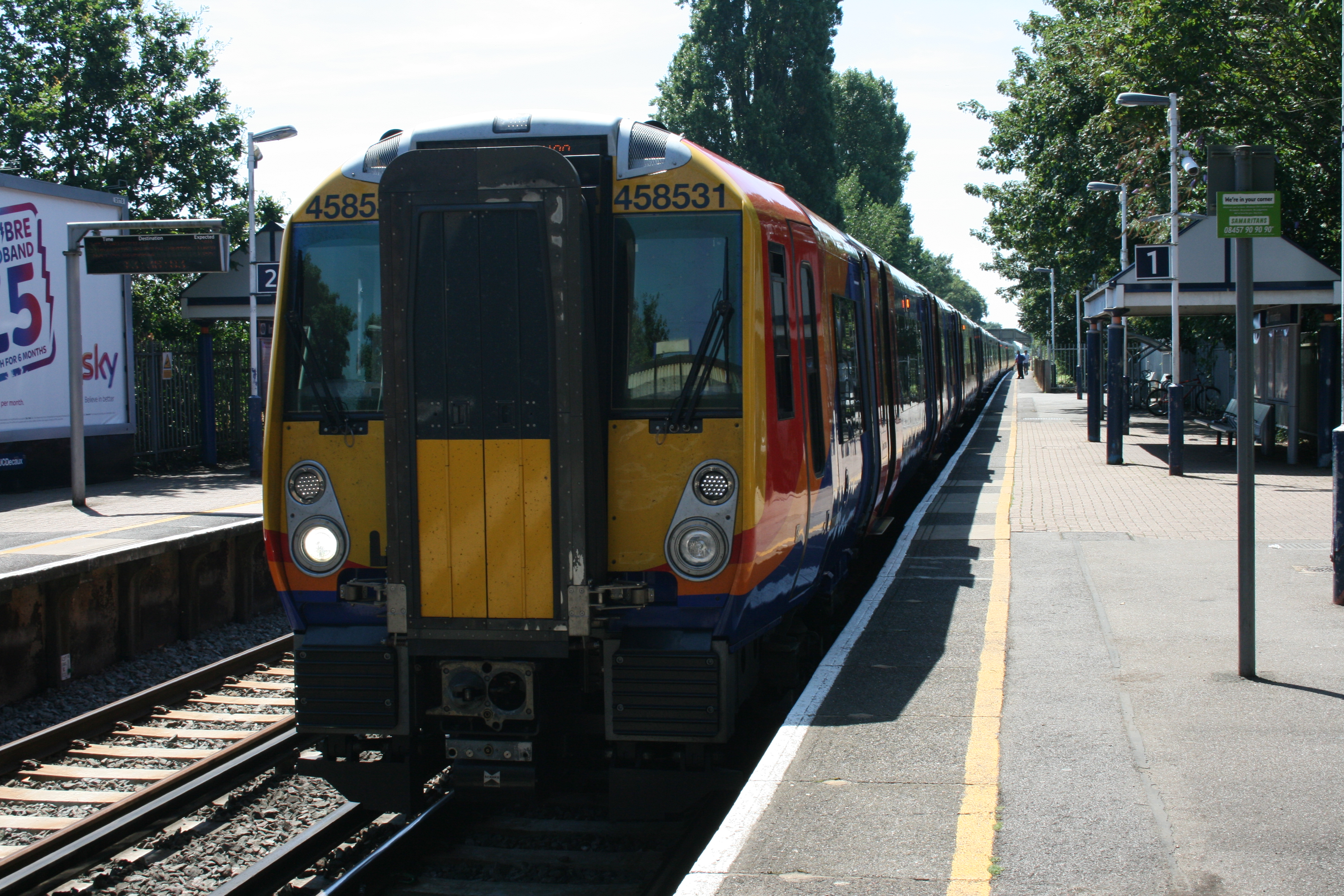
A Class 458 train no. 458531 on London Waterloo service at Syon Lane station in July 2014

All services at Syon Lane are operated by South Western Railway.

The typical off-peak service in trains per hour is:

- 2 tph to London Waterloo via Brentford
- 2 tph to Weybridge via Hounslow

Additional services, including trains to and from London Waterloo via Richmond call at the station during the peak hours.

On Sundays, the service is reduced to hourly in each direction and westbound trains run to and from Woking instead of Weybridge.

| Preceding station | National Rail | Following station |
|---|---|---|
| Brentford | South Western Railway Hounslow Loop Line | Isleworth |

== Connections ==
London Buses route H28 serves the station.

== Future ==
Transport for London has proposed opening a new West London Orbital line across West London, which would allow London Overground services to run from Brent Cross West, via Old Oak Common and Syon Lane, to Hounslow.
