= Brentford railway station =

National Rail station in London, England

Brentford
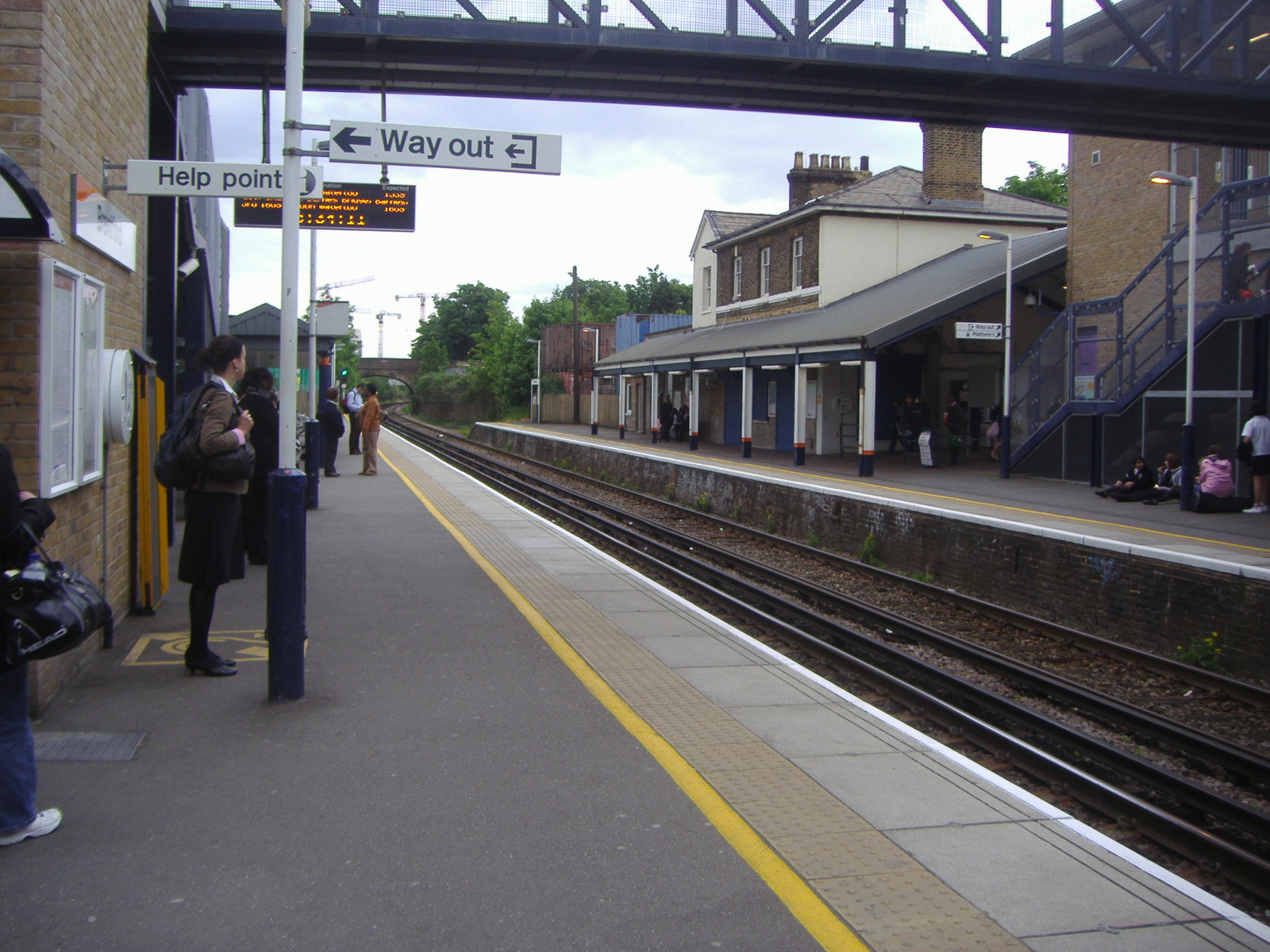
- Interactive map of Brentford

General information
- Location: Brentford
- Local authority: London Borough of Hounslow
- Managed by: South Western Railway
- Owner: Network Rail
- Station code: BFD
- DfT category: E
- Number of platforms: 2
- Accessible: Yes
- Fare zone: 4

National Rail annual entry and exit
- 2020–21: ▼0.414 million
- 2021–22: ▲0.806 million
- 2022–23: ▲0.898 million
- 2023–24: ▲0.984 million
- 2024–25: ▼0.977 million

Other information
- External links: Departures; Facilities
- Coordinates: 51.4875°N 0.3096°W

Brentford is a railway station in the town of Brentford, in the London Borough of Hounslow. It is on the Hounslow Loop Line and in London fare zone 4. The station and all trains serving it are operated by South Western Railway. It was the main station for Brentford F.C.'s former ground Griffin Park, 400 metres east. The modest High Street of the suburb of Brentford (characterized by wide-ranging businesses and light industrial parks) is 300 metres south-east.

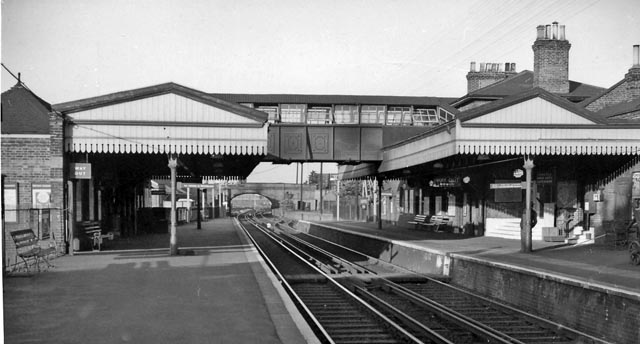
Brentford Central - view eastward to Barnes in May 1961

== History ==
Brentford railway station was opened in 1849 by the London and South Western Railway (LSWR) in a period of mainly passenger use. An unlinked perpendicular line, the Brentford Dock line operated between 1859 and 1964, mainly for goods and waste transfer. The Dock Line between 1860 and 1942 ran a passenger service into passenger terminus Brentford (GWR) railway station.

Between 1950 and 1980 Brentford station was named Brentford Central station. When multi-national pharmaceutical and retail company Glaxo Smith Kline opened its Global HQ 500 metres west, GSK House in 2001 after two years of construction, it contributed towards modernisation of the station.

Between 22 May 2000 and 28 September 2002, the station was served by the London Crosslink service provided by Anglia Railways.

== Services ==
All services at Brentford are operated by South Western Railway.

The typical off-peak service in trains per hour is:

- 2 tph to London Waterloo via Barnes
- 2 tph to Weybridge via Hounslow

Additional services, including trains to and from London Waterloo via Richmond call at the station during the peak hours.

On Sundays, the service is reduced to hourly in each direction and westbound trains run to and from Woking instead of Weybridge.

== Connections ==
London Buses routes 195, E2 and E8 serve the station.

== Future ==
Transport for London has proposed opening a new West London Orbital line across West London, which would allow London Overground services to run from Brent Cross West, via Old Oak Common and Brentford, to Hounslow.

Preceding station	National Rail	Following station
Kew Bridge	South Western Railway Hounslow Loop Line	Syon Lane
	Historical railways	
Willesden Junction	Anglia Railways London Crosslink	Feltham
