= Whitton railway station =

Railway station in London, England

Whitton
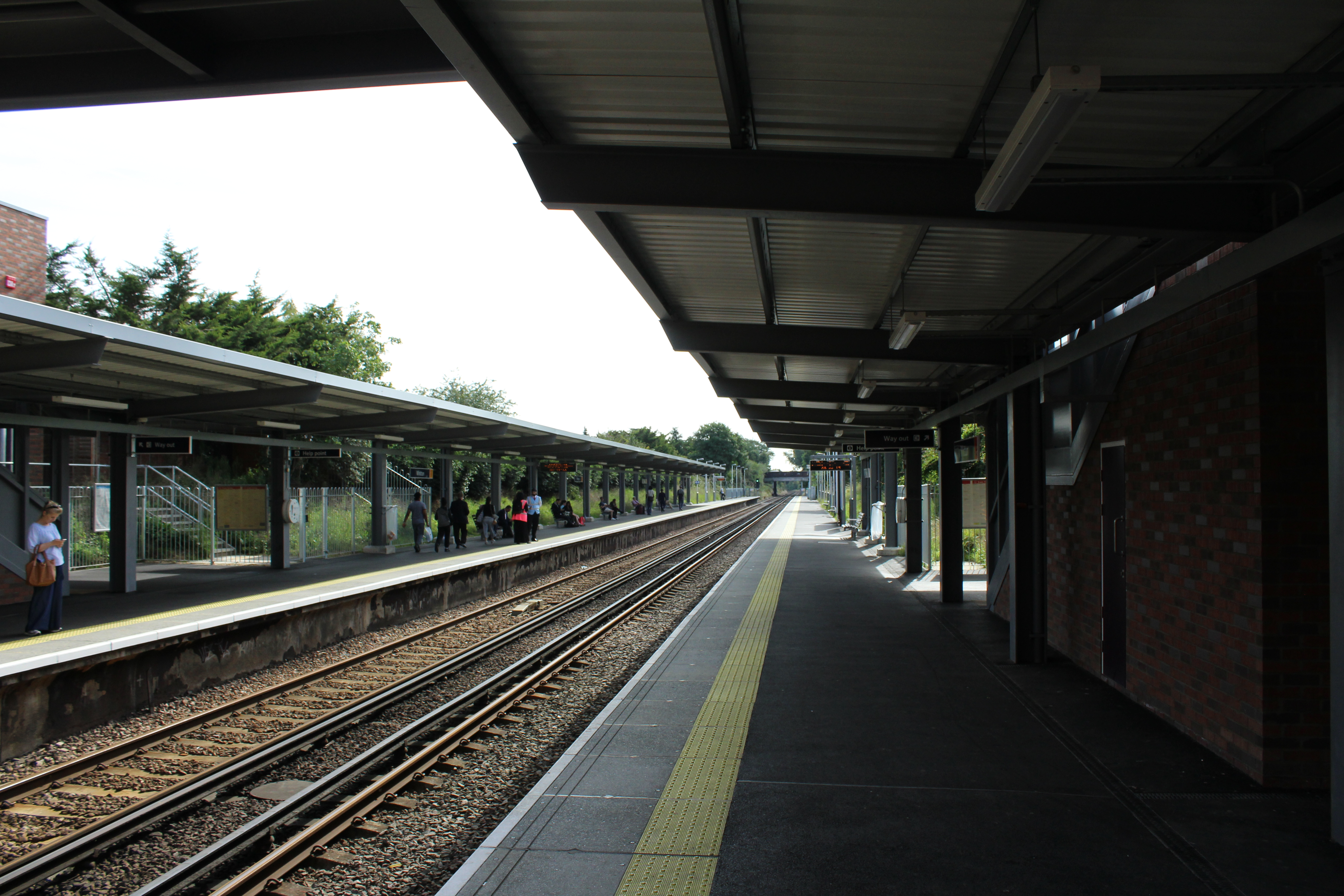
- Interactive map of Whitton

General information
- Location: Whitton
- Local authority: London Borough of Richmond upon Thames
- Managed by: South Western Railway
- Owner: Network Rail
- Station code: WTN
- DfT category: C2
- Number of platforms: 2
- Accessible: Yes
- Fare zone: 5

National Rail annual entry and exit
- 2020–21: ▼0.304 million
- 2021–22: ▲0.782 million
- 2022–23: ▲1.010 million
- 2023–24: ▲1.148 million
- 2024–25: ▲1.291 million

Railway companies
- Original company: Southern Railway

Key dates
- 6 July 1930: Opened

Other information
- External links: Departures; Facilities
- Coordinates: 51.4495°N 0.3578°W

Whitton railway station is in the London Borough of Richmond upon Thames in southwest London, within London fare zone 5. It is 12 miles 43 chains (20.2 km) down the line from London Waterloo. The station and all trains serving it are operated by South Western Railway. The station was extensively refurbished and its main buildings replaced 2015–2016. The footbridge was replaced so as to incorporate optional lifts to the platforms. Whitton station has a ticket office above the up (London-bound) platform containing a coffee shop, a taxi office, ticket machines and a disabled toilet. The station, to allow periods of no staff, lacks ticket barriers. The platforms were extended away from the building and footbridge in February 2012.

Whitton is the second closest station, when walking, to the Twickenham Stoop rugby union stadium - home of Harlequins and is about 700 metres further by pavement from Twickenham Stadium (compared to Twickenham railway station).

== History ==
The line through Whitton was opened by the Windsor, Staines and South Western Railway (WS&SWR) when the WS&SWR extended its line from Richmond to Datchet on 22 August 1848. In July 1850 the WS&SWR was absorbed into the London and South Western Railway (LSWR).

On 1 January 1883 the LSWR opened a curve enabling down trains from Twickenham to pass the site of what was to become Whitton station and access the Hounslow Loop. On 1 January 1923 the LSWR amalgamated with other railways to form the Southern Railway. In the late 1920s the Southern was planning to extend its third rail electric train system from London Waterloo to Windsor & Eton (Riverside). As part of that plan new development in what was once rural areas were to receive new stations. So, from 6 July 1930 the Windsor Lines became electrified and a new station was opened called Whitton. As today Whitton is a classic Southern structure with steel canopies and pre-cast concrete platforms. Whitton Station survived the war unscathed and three years after the war ended, on 1 January 1948, the station and line passed into the ownership of British Railways. In the 1980s and 1990s the station became part of Network South East and that changed due to the privatisation of the railways. Ever since the mid-1990s the franchise serving Whitton has been South Western Railway (formerly South West Trains).

In February 2015 the station started to be rebuilt. This was done in two phases – the first prior to the 2015 Rugby World Cup, and the second after that and completing in 2016. The renovation works were pencilled for completion in time for the 2015 Rugby World Cup, but completed late 2016.

== Services ==
All services at Whitton are operated by South Western Railway.

The typical off-peak service in trains per hour is:

- 2 tph to London Waterloo via Richmond
- 2 tph to Windsor & Eton Riverside

Additional services, including trains to and from Camberley, Aldershot and London Waterloo via Hounslow call at the station during the peak hours.

Preceding station	National Rail	Following station
Twickenham	South Western Railway Waterloo to Reading Line	Feltham
Twickenham	South Western Railway: Hounslow Loop Line; Peak Hours Only	Hounslow

== Connections ==
London Buses routes 110 and H22 serve the station.
