= Feltham railway station =

National Rail station in London, England

Feltham
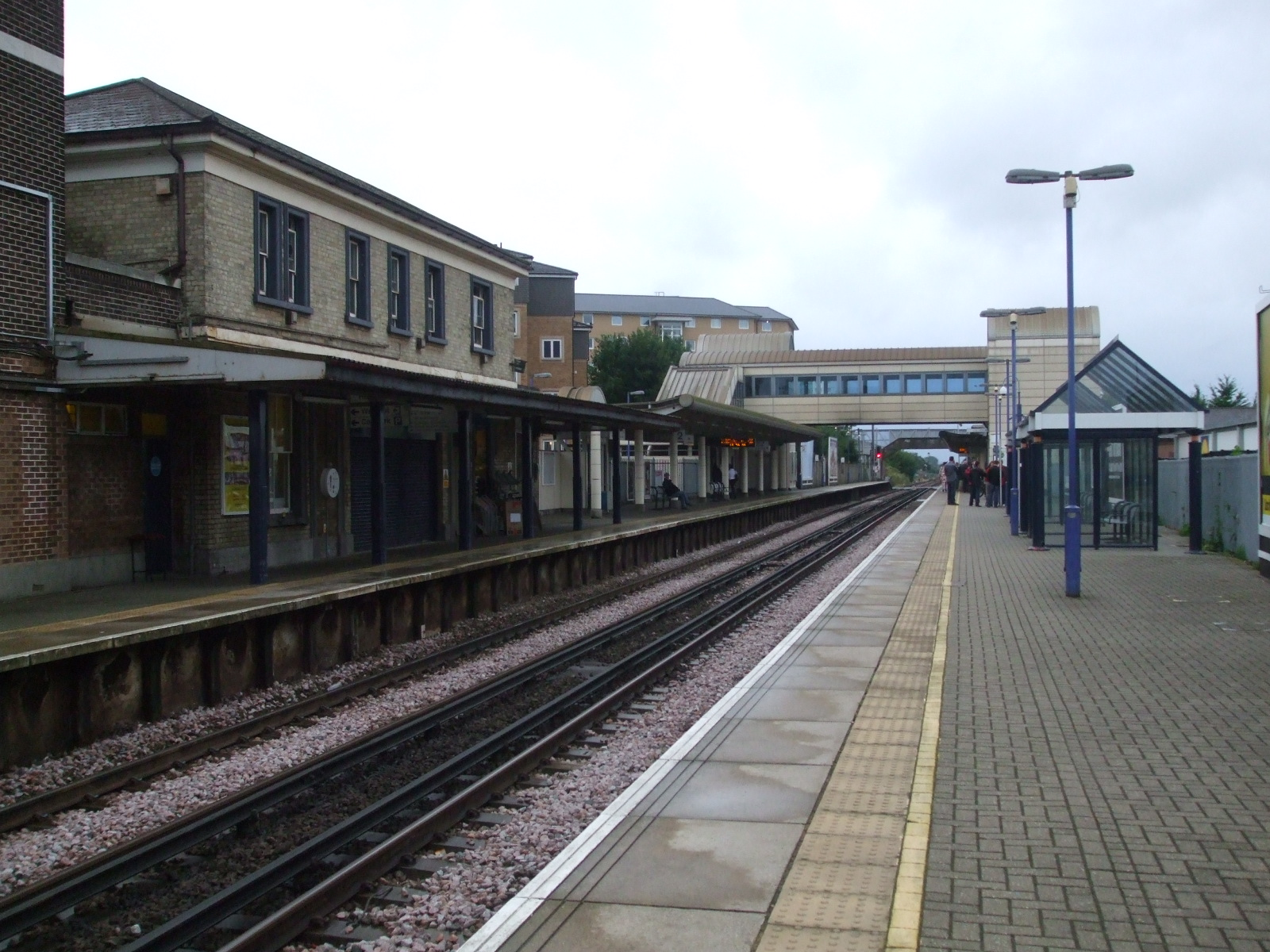
- Interactive map of Feltham

General information
- Location: Feltham
- Local authority: London Borough of Hounslow
- Managed by: South Western Railway
- Owner: Network Rail
- Station code: FEL
- DfT category: C2
- Number of platforms: 2
- Accessible: Yes
- Fare zone: 6

National Rail annual entry and exit
- 2020–21: ▼1.110 million
- 2021–22: ▲2.575 million
- 2022–23: ▲3.077 million
- 2023–24: ▲3.249 million
- 2024–25: ▲3.626 million

Key dates
- 22 August 1848: Opened

Other information
- External links: Departures; Facilities
- Coordinates: 51.4481°N 0.4088°W

Feltham railway station serves Feltham in the London Borough of Hounslow, west London. It was opened on 22 August 1848 by the Windsor, Staines and South Western Railway (later the London and South Western Railway).

It is 14 miles 68 chains (23.9 km) down the line from London Waterloo and is in London fare zone 6. Two regular bus routes run from the main road, to its east, to and from differing parts of Heathrow Airport.

== Facilities ==
A central, internal footbridge with stairs and lifts connects the platforms. To the west nearby is a footbridge and beyond that another that allows crossing by ramps and connects part of the town's 21st-century shopping/restaurants plaza to the eastbound side and a small part of Feltham, beyond which is Bedfont. The high street of Feltham starts 100 metres south and somewhat more, east.

A small shop, ticket machines and seating area are in the booking hall before the ticket barriers on the northern platform (1, eastbound or 'up'). Covered seating, vending machines, toilets and a coffee kiosk serve the platform.

The southern platform (2, westbound, or 'Down') hosts the bulk of the original station house. Two near-adjoining entrances, a small shop, automatic ticket machines and covered seating serve the platform. The mid-19th century former house is at the northern extremity of Feltham's principal architectural conservation area, taking in Hanworth Road, lined primarily with detached late Victorian houses.

The southern forecourt hosts a taxi rank, small car park and bays for courtesy buses to local employers (and if any track is closed, rail replacement bus services).

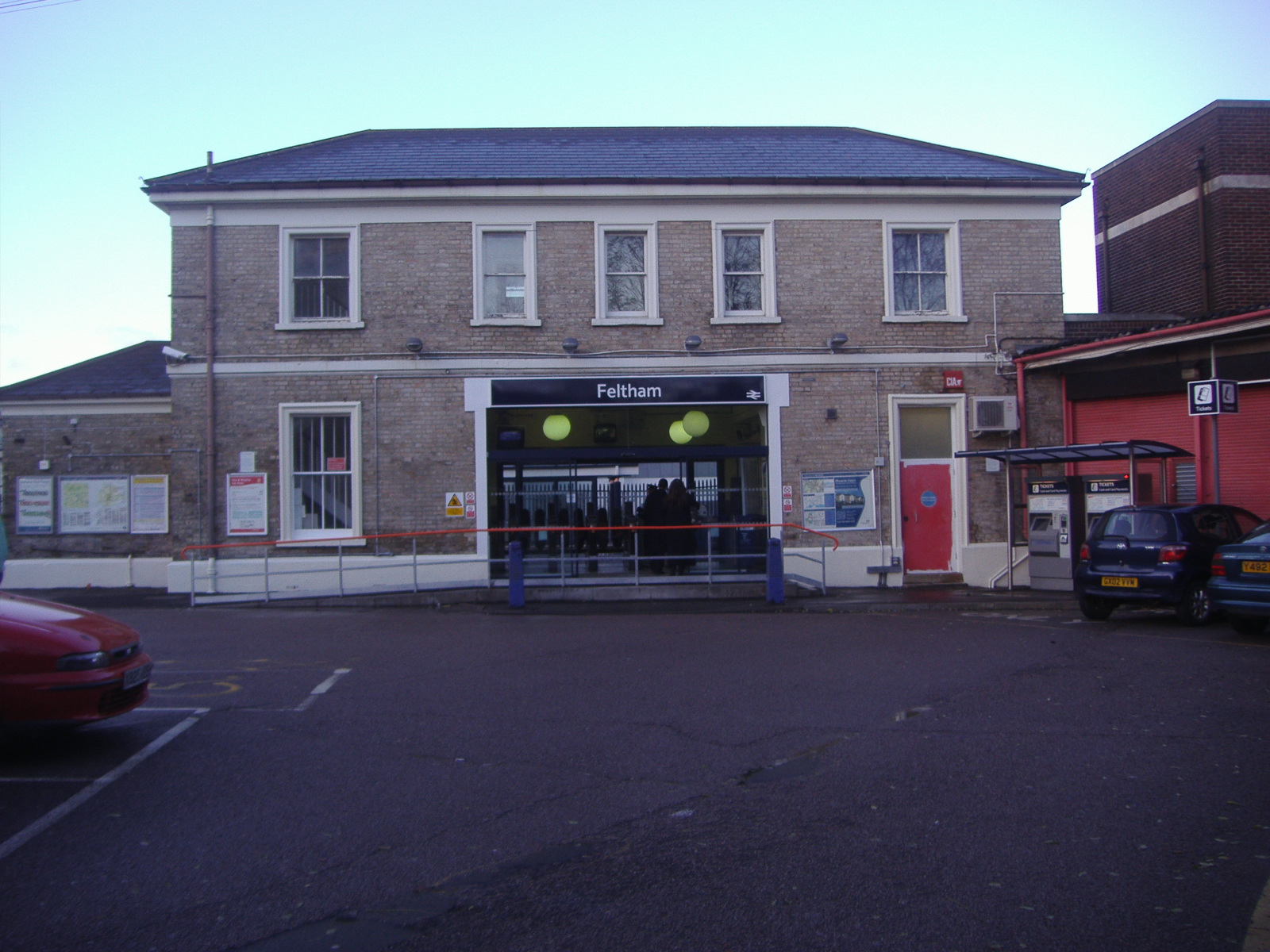
Main entrance on the westbound side in November 2008

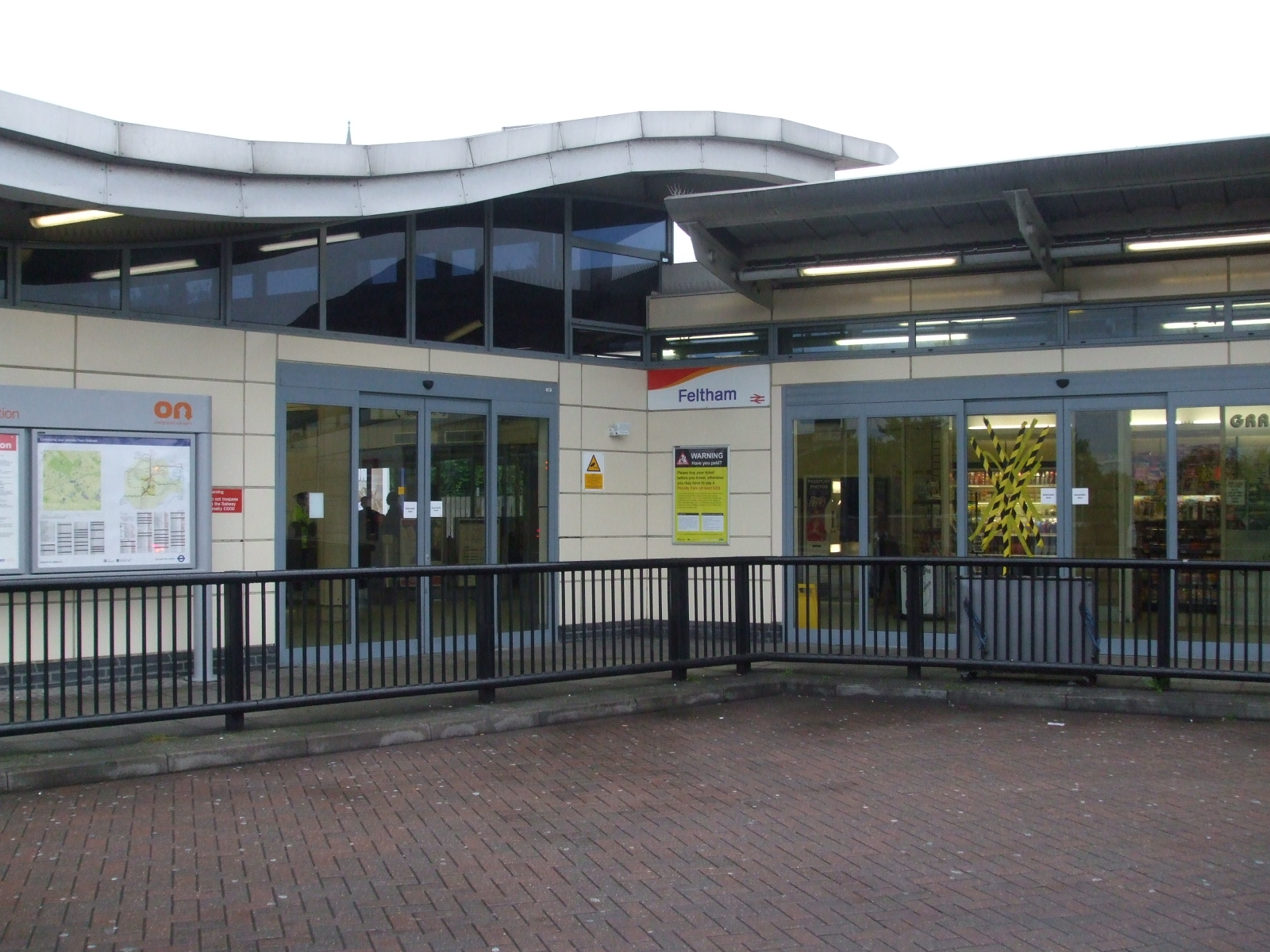
Entrance on the London-bound side in August 2008

== History ==
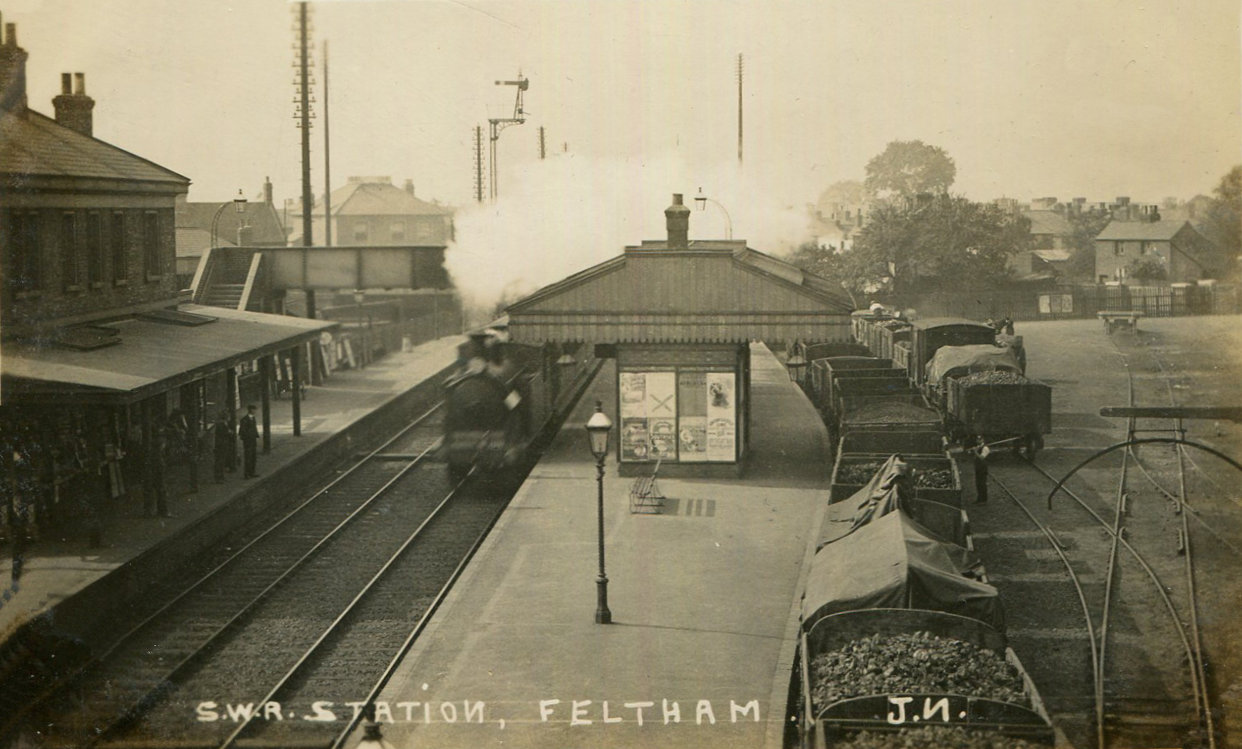
Feltham railway station in June 1905

Before World War II a main station entrance was built on the road bridge carrying Hounslow Road across the line – this and a footbridge were demolished in the early 1990s. A former Red Star Parcels office is vacant space in the southerly station house.

Adjacent land, once used in the rail sector, has become a supermarket and a private sports centre; to the east of the station was Feltham marshalling yard, one of the largest marshalling yards in the British Isles (1917–67) and a motive power depot.

Construction of the booking hall, internal bridge, their accessways and most facilities on the northern side dates to the 1990s. This was built under the SWELTRAC partnership between local authorities, Heathrow Airport Ltd (part of BAA), and the rail industry to boost public transport, including easy rail/bus interchange. Its apron/forecourt, for buses, fronts the southwestern part of New Road (and it fronts Bedfont Lane, with semi-open pavements to both).

Until March 2019, there was a level crossing at the station's west end, carrying part of Bedfont Lane. Due to the platforms being extended, the crossing was closed and the road split in two. Network Rail described the former crossing as "London's most misused level crossing", with an average of eight incidents of deliberate misuse per day.

== Services ==
All services at Feltham are operated by South Western Railway.

The typical off-peak service in trains per hour (tph) is:

- 6 tph to London Waterloo (2 of these are stopping services via Hounslow and 4 are semi-fast via Richmond)
- 2 tph to Weybridge
- 2 tph to Reading via Bracknell
- 2 tph to Windsor & Eton Riverside

Additional services, including trains to and from Camberley and Aldershot call at the station during the peak hours.

On Sundays, the stopping services between Weybridge and London Waterloo are reduced to hourly and westbound trains run to and from Woking instead of Weybridge. The service to Windsor & Eton Riverside is also reduced to 1 tph on its regular service pattern, with the extra service instead calling at all stations via Richmond.

Preceding station	National Rail	Following station
Whitton or Twickenham	South Western Railway Waterloo to Reading Line	Ashford or Staines
Hounslow	South Western Railway Hounslow Loop Line	Ashford or Staines
	Historical railways	
Brentford	Anglia Railways London Crosslink	Staines

== Connections ==
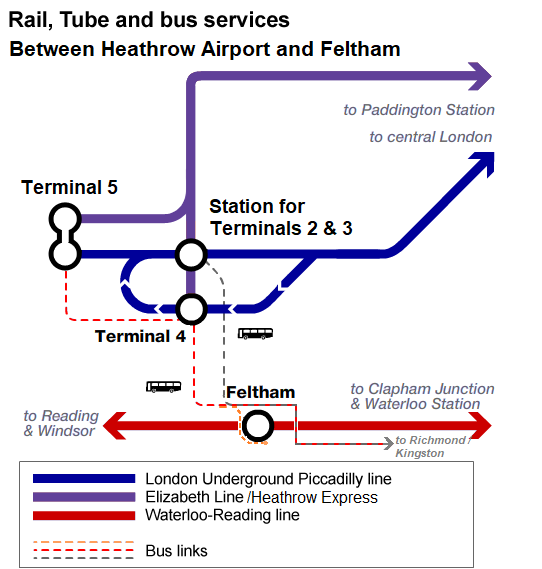
Map of bus connections from Feltham station to Heathrow Airport

London Buses routes 90, 117, 235, 285, 490, H25 and H26 serve the station.

== Proposals ==
The station's track lay in the now abandoned Heathrow Airtrack plan proposed by BAA. Railways, for passenger trains, would have splayed out from Heathrow Terminal 5 to London Waterloo, Reading and Guildford, replacing express bus services, and the first listed of these running directly via (calling at) Feltham. BAA withdrew the Airtrack plan in 2011.

Smaller proposals have followed. Hounslow Council, in 2016, consulted on a direct railway, with passenger services, between the line and Terminal 5 of Heathrow. The plan was again disbanded.
