= Hounslow railway station =

National Rail station in London, England

Hounslow
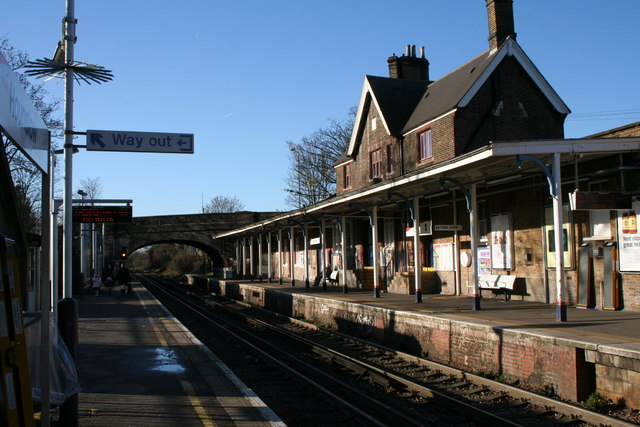
- Interactive map of Hounslow

General information
- Location: Hounslow
- Local authority: London Borough of Hounslow
- Managed by: South Western Railway
- Owner: Network Rail
- Station code: HOU
- DfT category: D
- Number of platforms: 2
- Accessible: Yes
- Fare zone: 5

National Rail annual entry and exit
- 2020–21: ▼0.372 million
- Interchange: ▼4,851
- 2021–22: ▲0.692 million
- Interchange: ▲11,299
- 2022–23: ▲0.762 million
- Interchange: ▼1,060
- 2023–24: ▲0.823 million
- Interchange: ▼981
- 2024–25: ▲0.850 million
- Interchange: ▲1,382

Key dates
- 1 February 1850: Opened

Other information
- External links: Departures; Facilities
- Coordinates: 51.462°N 0.3622°W

Hounslow railway station, on the Hounslow Loop Line, is in the London Borough of Hounslow, in Greater London, and is in London fare zone 5. The station and all trains serving it are operated by South Western Railway.

== History ==
The London and South Western Railway opened the calling point on 1 February 1850 on completion of the bridges and embankments at Isleworth station. A temporary station had opened as "Hounslow" 400 metres northeast of the present Isleworth station on 22 August 1849 to allow a service to run until the loop was connected and the line complete. After this point the main commercial businesses of Hounslow and landmark buildings moved westward along Staines Road, Hounslow's fledgling high street and a major then-artery serving London and the south-west to reflect the new position of the railway station serving the nascent town. The Victoria County History series local historian Susan Reynolds, in 1962, noted

"...it was not until the very end [of the nineteenth century] that there were any houses to speak of to the south of the station."

A resident station master was installed at the replacement Hounslow station in the early years and ceased to occupy the station house in the mid 20th century.

A total of £650,000 was spent for alterations over four months in the early 2010s including a larger booking hall and toilet, access for people with disabilities and low-energy, semi-automated lighting.

== Services ==
All services at Hounslow are operated by South Western Railway.

The typical off-peak service in trains per hour is:

- 2 tph to London Waterloo via Brentford
- 2 tph to Weybridge via Staines

Additional services, including trains to and from London Waterloo via Richmond call at the station during the peak hours.

On Sundays, the service is reduced to hourly in each direction and westbound trains run to and from Woking instead of Weybridge.

Preceding station	National Rail	Following station
Isleworth	South Western Railway Waterloo to Reading Line	Feltham
Isleworth	South Western Railway: Hounslow Loop Line; Peak Hours Only	Whitton

== Connections ==
London Buses route 281 serves the station.

== Service expansion schemes ==
Two early 21st century proposals short of central government pledge stage, or Network Rail proposals, exist for the Hounslow Loop Line, further details of which are mentioned at Syon Lane.

In 2017 a proposal to extend the London Overground network to Hounslow was announced by the London Assembly and Transport for London. The scheme, known as the West London Orbital envisages re-opening the Dudding Hill Line to passenger services and running trains from West Hampstead Thameslink and Hendon to Hounslow via the planned Old Oak Common Lane station. The plans are currently at public consultation stage with TfL.

== In popular culture ==
- The station was featured in the music video for the 1982 Depeche Mode song See You.
- The line "Jeffrey, take the 9pm to Hounslow out of your mouth" is stated by character Stewie Griffin in the Family Guy episode "Dammit Janet!" (2000).
