= Hounslow Loop line =

Suburban electric railway line in England

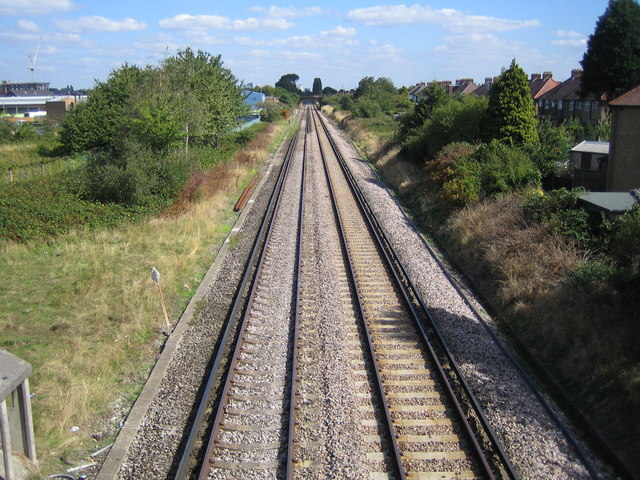
- The line between Hounslow and Isleworth

Overview
- Status: Operational
- Owner: Network Rail
- Locale: Greater London
- Termini: London Waterloo
- Stations: 7

Service
- Type: Commuter rail, Suburban rail
- System: National Rail
- Operator(s): South Western Railway
- Rolling stock: Class 458; Class 450

History
- Opened: 1850

Technical
- Number of tracks: 2
- Track gauge: 1,435 mm (4 ft 8 1/2 in) standard gauge
- Electrification: 750 V DC third rail
- Operating speed: 60 miles per hour (97 km/h)
Route map
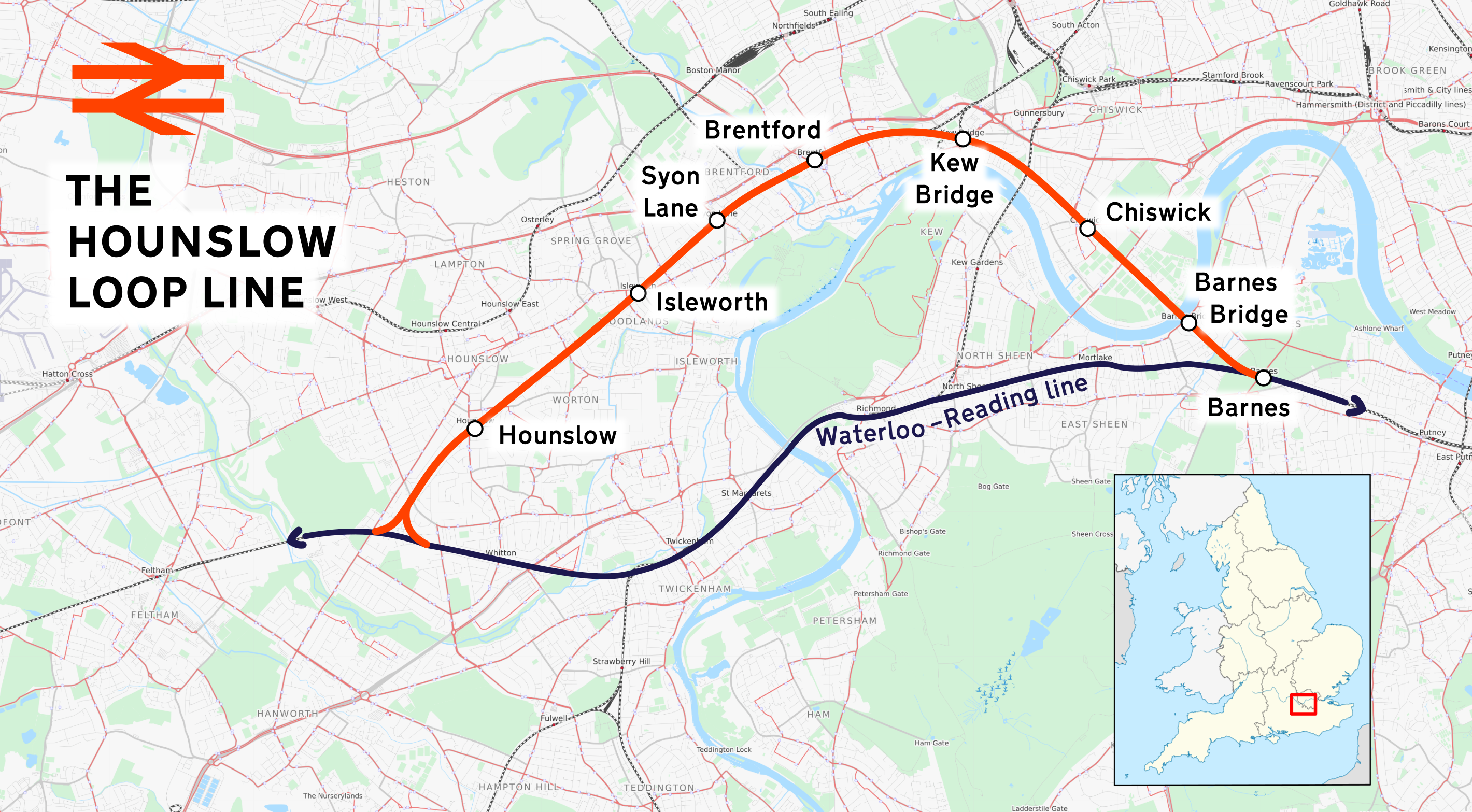
(Click to expand)

The Hounslow Loop line is a railway line in southwest London which was opened by the London and South Western Railway in 1850. It leaves the Waterloo–Reading line at Barnes Junction and after some seven and a half miles rejoins it at a triangular junction between Whitton and Feltham. Barnes Railway Bridge carries the line over the River Thames. Passenger services, all operated by South Western Railway, either loop back to Waterloo by the junctions or continue southwest via Feltham. The line is electrified at 750 V DC (third rail). It provides access to the North London Line for freight services both passing through Clapham Junction to the north east and connecting to the rail network to the south west.

== Passenger services and rolling stock ==
Most service to stations on the Hounslow Loop line are provided by trains operating between London Waterloo and Weybridge via Staines.

As of December 2023, the typical weekday and Saturday service is 2 trains per hour in each direction to and from Waterloo. Trains use the Waterloo to Reading Line between Waterloo and Barnes, take the loop between Barnes Bridge and Hounslow stations, and operate to and from Weybridge via Staines.

On Sunday, service is reduced to hourly and diverted to Woking.

At peak hours, additional trains running do not serve Staines and Weybridge, but rather travel in a loop to and from Waterloo via Hounslow and Richmond.

Services are generally operated by Class 450 units operating in a 4 or 8 car configuration. Class 458 units also work the line. All units on the line are to be replaced by Class 701 Aventra units.

== Ridership ==
The line has seen a steep increase in ridership levels in recent years, corresponding with the doubling of train frequencies from 2 trains per hour in each direction to 4 (except on Sundays). The line's seven stations had combined passenger numbers of 5.565 million in 2007–08 (based on station exits), a 162% increase on the 2004–05 figure of 2.122 million.

== Recent changes ==
Most stations had platforms lengthened to allow the operation of 10 coach trains from May 2013. Where this was not possible, selective door opening is used.

Platform 20 at Waterloo (within the former Waterloo International terminal) came into use in May 2014 to provide additional capacity.

== Future developments ==
A proposal published in 2017 by the London Assembly and Transport for London envisages extending the London Overground network to run trains on the section of the Hounslow Loop Line between Brentford and Hounslow. The scheme, known as the West London Orbital, would involve the re-opening of the Dudding Hill Line to passenger services and running trains from West Hampstead Thameslink and Hendon via the planned Old Oak Common Lane station. A new station may be constructed at Lionel Road, close to Kew Bridge. The plans are currently at public consultation stage with TfL.
