= Kenley =

Coordinates: 51.3242°N 0.0969°W

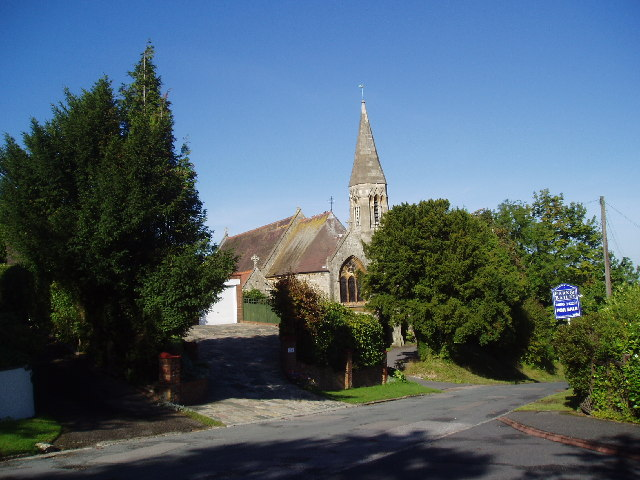
- All Saints Church, Kenley

- Location within Greater London
- Population: 14,966 (2011)
- OS grid reference: TQ327600
  - Charing Cross: 13 mi (21 km) N
- London borough: Croydon
- Ceremonial county: Greater London
- Region: London
- Country: England
- Sovereign state: United Kingdom
- Post town: KENLEY
- Postcode district: CR8
- Dialling code: 020
- Police: Metropolitan
- Fire: London
- Ambulance: London
- UK Parliament: Croydon South
- London Assembly: Croydon and Sutton

Kenley is a residential suburb within the London Borough of Croydon. It is located 13 miles (21 km) south of Charing Cross and within the southern boundary of London, England. Surrounded by the Metropolitan Green Belt on three sides, it includes the large open spaces of Kenley Common and Kenley Aerodrome. Kenley was part of the ancient parish of Coulsdon in the county of Surrey and was connected to central London by rail in 1856. As the population of the area was growing, it became part of Coulsdon and Purley Urban District in 1915 and has formed part of Greater London since 1965. At the 2011 Census, Kenley had a population of 14,966.

== History ==
=== Local government ===
Kenley was a hamlet in the ancient parish Coulsdon in the county of Surrey. In 1894 the Coulsdon parish became part of Croydon Rural District. Responding to the increase in population in the area, the rural district was broken up in 1915 and the parish of Coulsdon became part of Coulsdon and Purley Urban District. Coulsdon and Purley was incorporated into Greater London in 1965 and became part of the London Borough of Croydon.

=== Suburban development ===
For centuries, Kenley was part of Coulsdon Manor which covered the whole area now known as Coulsdon, Old Coulsdon, Purley and Kenley. As with most of this area, Kenley was primarily farm land, with a few big houses and their estates.

The official opening of the railway on 4 August 1856 transformed Kenley. The new railway prompted urban development. By the end of the Victorian era, Kenley had assumed its own identity. Magnificent gentlemen's houses in substantial grounds were constructed during the 1860s. These houses gave Kenley its distinctive appearance on its western hillside. More modest housing and shops were built along the Godstone Road in the 1880s. Finally, the compact housing of the lower lying Roke area was constructed toward the end of the 19th century.

All Saints' Church, now a Grade II listed building, was built in 1870, and enlarged in 1897 and 1902. In 1888, Kenley was created as a parish in its own right.

One of Kenley's landmark buildings is the Memorial Hall. It was opened in 1922 to commemorate those who gave their lives in the First World War. It was subsequently extended and re-opened by Group Captain Douglas Bader in 1975.

=== Second World War ===
RAF Kenley was a strategic airfield in the Battle of Britain. Given RAF Kenley's importance, the Luftwaffe attempted to destroy it by means of a massive bombing raid on 18 August 1940. The attacking Luftwaffe aircraft suffered heavy casualties during the raid. Despite some damage to the airfield and the surrounding buildings and homes, this bombing raid proved unsuccessful. By the following day, RAF Kenley was operational again.

Kenley airfield plays a unique role in Britain’s history as the UK’s most complete surviving Battle of Britain fighter airfield.

Hammond Innes' book Attack Alarm was based on his experiences as a Royal Artillery anti-aircraft gunner at RAF Kenley during the Battle of Britain. It contains graphic descriptions of the station and attacks on it in 1940.

=== Post-war development ===
In the post-war period, many of the substantial Victorian properties with their extensive grounds were developed for executive housing. In 1959, Kenley was closed as an operational base of the RAF. Today, the aerodrome is used exclusively by the gliders of the Air Training Corps (615 Volunteer Gliding Squadron) and the Surrey Hills Gliding Club.

== Geography ==
Kenley is located 13 miles (21 km) south of Charing Cross and adjacent to the Greater London boundary. It is situated south of Purley, east of Coulsdon and west of Sanderstead. It is almost completely surrounded by the Metropolitan Green Belt, forming part of a finger of urban development that extends into Surrey to include Caterham and Whyteleafe to the south. The south of the area is dominated by the open green spaces of Kenley Common and Kenley Aerodrome.

== Kenley Common ==
Kenley Common comprises 138 acres of green open space surrounding the former Battle of Britain airfield. It is a mixture of chalk grassland and ancient woodland set among gently rolling hills. Blessed with fine views across the Caterham valley and the North Downs beyond, visitors find it hard to believe that the centre of London is only 14 miles to the north.

The original common was bought by the Corporation of London in 1883. At that time, it encompassed some of the area that is now Kenley Airfield. Over the years, compulsory purchases by the Government and subsequent land acquisitions and re-acquisitions have meant that the Common has changed its shape and position, and almost doubled in size.

The common’s history as an airfield goes back to the First World War when planes were assembled and tested for squadrons in France. It proved an important link in the chain of supply and became established as a permanent Royal Air Force station. The Second World War saw concrete runways being laid and, as headquarters of ‘B’ Sector in the No 11 Group of fighter stations, it was soon playing a key role in the Battle of Britain. Kenley is now the last remaining Battle of Britain fighter station in the southeast to remain in its Second World War form. Evidence of its wartime role has survived and the old blast bays, air raid shelters, officer’s mess and the original runways can still be seen. English Heritage identified Kenley as the "most complete fighter airfield associated with the Battle of Britain to have survived".

== Demography ==
In the 2011 census, Kenley was White or White British (76.6%), Asian or Asian British (9.7%), Black or Black British (6.8%), Mixed/multiple ethnic groups (4.8%), and Other ethnic group (1.2%). The largest single ethnicity is White British (70.3%).

The largest religious groupings are Christians (59.8%), followed by those of no religion (23.4%), no response (7.7%), Hindus (3.8%), Muslims (3.4%), Buddhists (0.7%), other (0.4%), Jews (0.2%) and Sikhs (0.1%).

== Politics ==
Kenley is located within the parliamentary constituency of Croydon South. The incumbent MP is Chris Philp of the Conservative Party, who was re-elected with 30,985 votes in the 2019 general election.

At a local level, Kenley has two Conservative councillors on Croydon Borough Council.

Boundary changes at the 2018 Local Elections saw the number of Councillors reduced from three to two.

Kenley 2018 (2)
Party	Candidate	Votes	%	±%
Conservative	Jan Buttinger*	2,025	67.2	
Conservative	Stephen O'Connell*	1,966		
Labour	Maggie Conway	613	17.3	
Labour	Appu Srinivasan	448		
Green	Kate Morris	250	8.1	
Green	Ian Dixon	232		
Liberal Democrats	Anne Howard	207	6.5	
Liberal Democrats	Arfan Bhatti	186		
Majority		1,353	22.8	
Turnout				
Conservative hold		Swing		
Conservative hold		Swing		

Kenley 2014(3)
Party	Candidate	Votes	%	±%
Conservative	Janice Buttinger	2,271	55.2	
Conservative	Steven Hollands	2,123		
Conservative	Steve O'Connell	2,111		
UKIP	John Hooper	914	22.9	
UKIP	Ian Manton	903		
UKIP		898		
Labour	Sarah Ward	451	10.2	
Labour	Chris Williams	388		
Labour	Mary Crous	356		
Green	Shorai Dixon	336	4.9	
Liberal Democrats	Mary Catto	271	7.1	
Green	Tomas Vute	265		
Liberal Democrats	Arfan Bhatti	238		
Liberal Democrats	Thomas Knight	217		
Total votes		11,733		
Conservative hold		Swing		
Conservative hold		Swing		
Conservative hold		Swing		

== Climate ==
Climate data for Kenley (1991–2020)
Month	Jan	Feb	Mar	Apr	May	Jun	Jul	Aug	Sep	Oct	Nov	Dec	Year
Mean daily maximum °C (°F)	7.0 (44.6)	7.4 (45.3)	10.1 (50.2)	13.2 (55.8)	16.5 (61.7)	19.5 (67.1)	21.7 (71.1)	21.4 (70.5)	18.3 (64.9)	14.2 (57.6)	10.1 (50.2)	7.5 (45.5)	14.0 (57.2)
Mean daily minimum °C (°F)	2.0 (35.6)	1.9 (35.4)	3.3 (37.9)	5.1 (41.2)	7.9 (46.2)	10.7 (51.3)	12.8 (55.0)	12.9 (55.2)	10.6 (51.1)	8.1 (46.6)	4.8 (40.6)	2.5 (36.5)	6.9 (44.4)
Average rainfall mm (inches)	86.6 (3.41)	65.4 (2.57)	53.6 (2.11)	57.1 (2.25)	59.0 (2.32)	59.0 (2.32)	56.2 (2.21)	66.2 (2.61)	66.1 (2.60)	94.3 (3.71)	92.2 (3.63)	90.5 (3.56)	846.7 (33.33)
Average rainy days (≥ 1 mm)	13.1	11.2	9.8	9.8	9.5	9.3	8.5	9.3	9.5	12.7	13.2	13.2	129.5
Source: Met Office

== Schools ==
- The Hayes Primary School
- The Harris Primary Academy Kenley

== Nearest places ==
- Purley
- Coulsdon
- Caterham
- Whyteleafe
- Warlingham
- Riddlesdown
- Sanderstead

== Nearest stations ==
- Kenley railway station
- Purley railway station
- Reedham (Surrey) railway station
- Upper Warlingham railway station
- Whyteleafe railway station

== Notable current or former residents ==
- David Baboulene
- Douglas Bader
- Peter Cushing
- Tommy Eytle
- Raza Jaffrey
- Cherry Kearton
- Des O'Connor
- Ray Mears
- Ellie Pearce
- Karl Popper
- Allan Stewart
- Harry Worth
- Sophie Webber
- Kit Connor
