= Whyteleafe =

Village in Surrey, England

Coordinates: 51.3088°N 0.0833°W

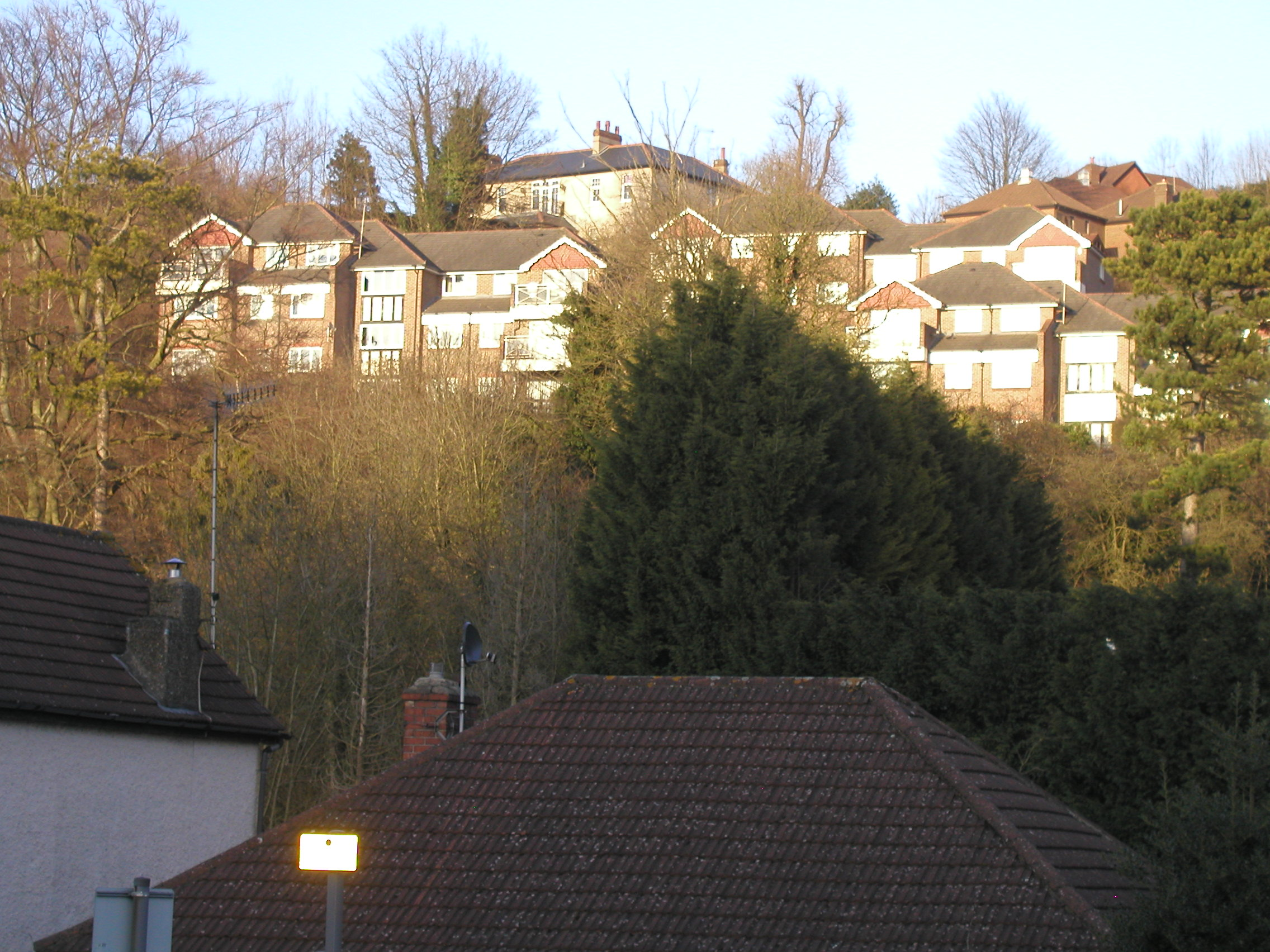
- Typical landscape of Whyteleafe along the dry valley from the A22

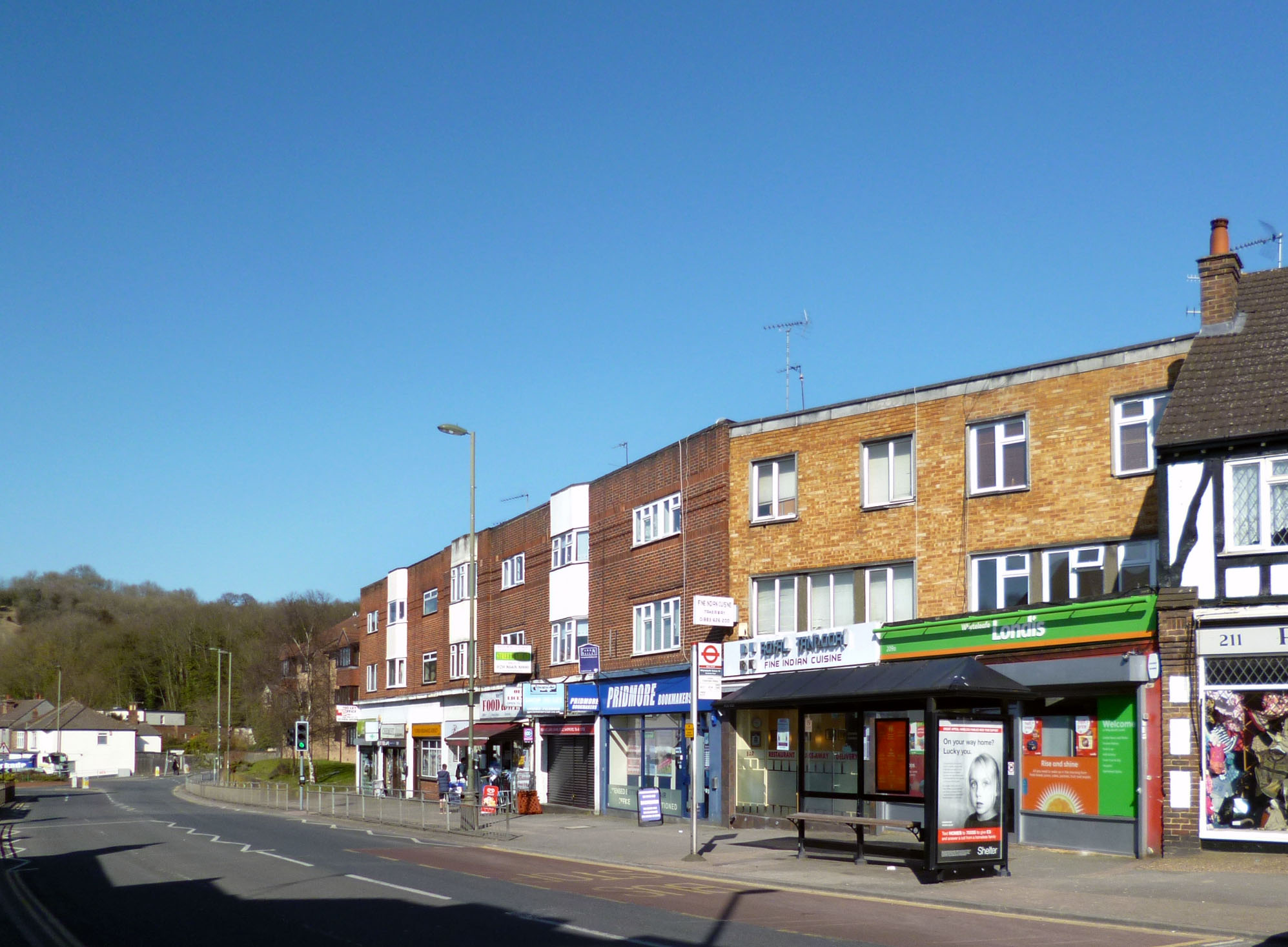
- Part of the shopping area on Godstone Road near to Whyteleafe and Upper Warlingham railway stations

- Location within Surrey
- Area: 2.167 km^{2} (0.837 sq mi)
- Population: 4,620 (Civil Parish 2021)
  - Density: 2,132/km^{2} (5,520/sq mi)
- OS grid reference: TQ336583
- Civil parish: Whyteleafe
- District: Tandridge
- Shire county: Surrey
- Region: South East
- Country: England
- Sovereign state: United Kingdom
- Post town: WHYTELEAFE
- Postcode district: CR3
- Dialling code: 020; 01883
- Police: Surrey
- Fire: Surrey
- Ambulance: South East Coast
- UK Parliament: East Surrey; Croydon South

Whyteleafe is a village in the district of Tandridge, Surrey, England, with a few streets falling inside the London Borough of Croydon. The village, in a dry valley of the North Downs, has three railway stations (on two parallel lines). Neighbouring villages and towns include Woldingham, Caterham, Coulsdon, Warlingham, and Kenley. To the west are Kenley Aerodrome, Kenley Common (owned by the Corporation), Coxes Wood, and Blize Wood. To the east are Riddlesdown, the Dobbin and Marden Park.

The churchyard contains graves of airmen who died during WWII, stationed at RAF Kenley nearby. The village forms part of the Greater London Built-up Area.

== History ==
The village name comes from the distinctive white underside of the whitebeam trees growing in the area. In 1855 Nathaniel Glover purchased White Leaf field and George Henry Drew later completed the building that was called "White Leafe House". By 1881 the surrounding area had become known as "Whiteleafe". As with Kenley the history of its land before that was that of other parishes, in this case Caterham and to a lesser extent Warlingham and Coulsdon.

Its first primary school was built in 1892, enlarged in 1900 and again in 1907.

In 1911 the population of Whyteleafe was "now larger than that of Warlingham village...A county council secondary school for girls has been set up in this year (1911)."

== Amenities ==
Whyteleafe has various shops and amenities. To the south of Whyteleafe are the headquarters of Gold Group International, the largest employer in the parish boundaries.

Whyteleafe School, is a primary school which is part of the multi academy trust GLF and is situated at the bottom of Whyteleafe Hill. It makes use of the site of the former Whyteleafe Girls' Grammar School, vacated in the late 1970s. Warlingham School (secondary) is at the top of Tithe Pit Shaw Lane, on the edge of Whyteleafe in the east.

The C of E church of St Luke was built in 1866, founded as a new parish in the Diocese of Southwark.

== Transport ==
There are three railway stations: Whyteleafe South, Whyteleafe and Upper Warlingham. All three stations are served by Southern services. The Godstone road (A22) cuts through north to south. Bus routes 407, 434 and 439 serve the area and run from Coulsdon, Croydon, Sutton, Waddon Marsh and Caterham. Whyteleafe village grew after the railway came on its way to Caterham in 1856. A second line, the Oxted Line, following a slightly higher contour, opened in 1884. It serves different destinations to the south but also runs to London Bridge or Victoria.

== Sport and leisure ==
AFC Whyteleafe is the main football club following the closure of Whyteleafe F.C. in 2021. AFC Whyteleafe, like its predecessor, plays in grounds on Church Road where the former club moved in 1959, when it moved from the field off New Barn Lane, now utilised by the adjacent Kenley School. Separate from its ground in the west of town is the large recreation ground below wooded hills in the east of town which has informal sports fields and a playground.

Caterham and Whyteleafe Tennis Club is located in Manor Park near Whyteleafe South Station. The Surrey National Golf Club is located in nearby Chaldon.

== Local government ==
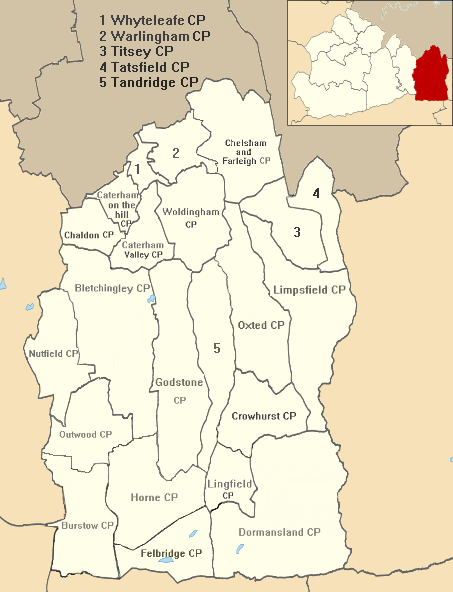
Civil Parishes in Tandridge District

Surrey County Council, headquartered in Reigate, elected every four years, has one councillor representing Caterham Valley, which incorporates the civil parishes of Caterham Valley and Whyteleafe.

Election	Member	Ward
2021	Jeffrey Gray	Caterham Valley

Whyteleafe has 2 representatives on Tandridge District Council, headquartered in Oxted:

Election	Member	Ward
2016	David Lee	Whyteleafe
2018	Jeffrey Gray	Whyteleafe

Whyteleafe is one of 21 civil parish councils in Tandridge District electing seven parish councillors every four years. The parish council clerk is Simon Bold.

== Demography and housing ==
2021 Census Ethnicity
Ethnic Group	Percentage	Total
White	77.3%	3569
Asian	7.3%	335
Mixed	7.3%	335
Black	6.9%	318
Other	1.4%	66

2021 Census Religion
Religion	Percentage	Total
No Religion	44%	2033
Christianity	42.3%	1956
No Response	6.9%	320
Islam	3.1%	141
Hinduism	1.9%	87
Other Religion	0.8%	37
Buddhism	0.7%	34
Judaism	0.2%	9
Sikhism	0.1%	6

2021 Census Accommodation Type
Accommodation Type	Percentage	Total
In a purpose-built block of flats or tenement	50.8%	1083
Detached	16.1%	343
Semi-detached	14.4%	306
Terraced	12.3%	261
Part of a converted or shared house, including bedsits	4%	86
Part of another converted building, for example, former school, church or warehouse	1.3%	27
In a commercial building, for example, in an office building, hotel or over a shop	1.1%	23
A caravan or other mobile or temporary structure	0.05%	1

2021 Census Tenure
Tenure Type	Percentage	Total
Owned with a mortgage or loan	37.7%	804
Private rented from private landlord or letting agency	21.1%	450
Owned outright	20.9%	447
Shared ownership	7.7%	165
Other social rented	6.2%	133
Social rented from council or other local authority	4.5%	96
Other private rented	1.8%	39
Lives rent free	0%	0

== See also ==
- List of places of worship in Tandridge (district)
