= Kenley railway station =

National Rail station in London, England

Kenley
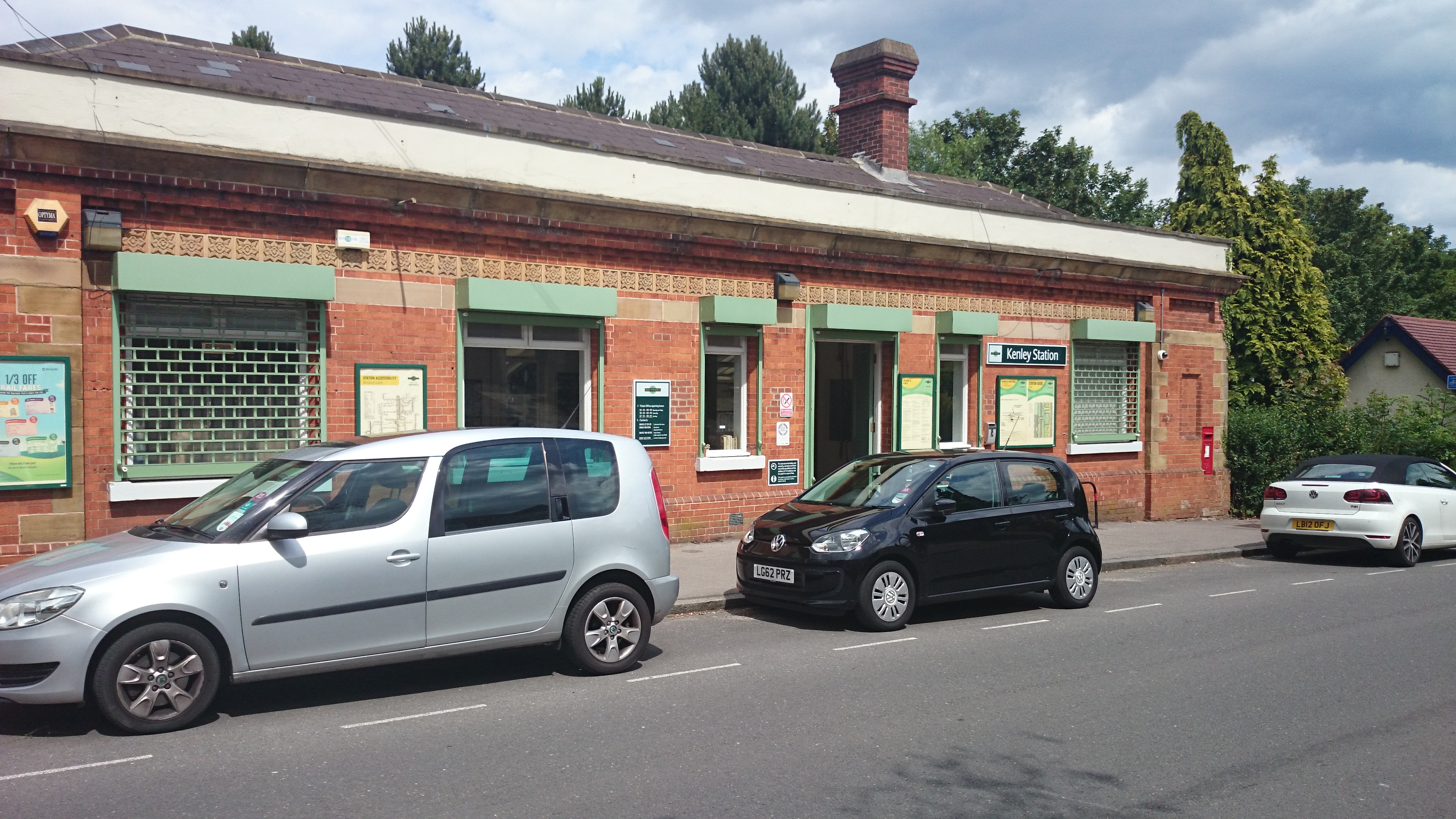
- Kenley Station main building on Kenley Lane
- Interactive map of Kenley

General information
- Location: Kenley
- Local authority: London Borough of Croydon
- Managed by: Southern
- Station code: KLY
- DfT category: E
- Number of platforms: 2
- Accessible: Yes
- Fare zone: 6

National Rail annual entry and exit
- 2020–21: ▼88,514
- 2021–22: ▲0.207 million
- 2022–23: ▲0.247 million
- 2023–24: ▲0.266 million
- 2024–25: ▲0.269 million

Key dates
- 5 August 1856: Opened as Coulsdon
- November 1856: Renamed Kenley
- 1899: Branch was double-tracked

Other information
- External links: Departures; Facilities
- Coordinates: 51.3246°N 0.1007°W

Kenley railway station serves Kenley in the London Borough of Croydon in south London. The station and all trains serving it are operated by Southern, and it is in London fare zone 6, on the Caterham Line 16 miles 29 chains (26.3 km) from London Charing Cross. The station is served by trains from Caterham to Purley, East Croydon, London Bridge and London Victoria. It is the last station on this line located within the Greater London area, however Oyster fares are available up to and including the end of the line at Caterham.

On the London-bound platform (Platform 1) is a staffed ticket office (during some peak hours) and a self-service passenger-operated Ticket Machine. A second self-service Ticket Machine is available just outside the Caterham-bound platform (Platform 2) which is suitably located to purchase tickets for the car park which is also located on this side.

The nearest station with more substantial staffed hours is Purley.

== Station history ==
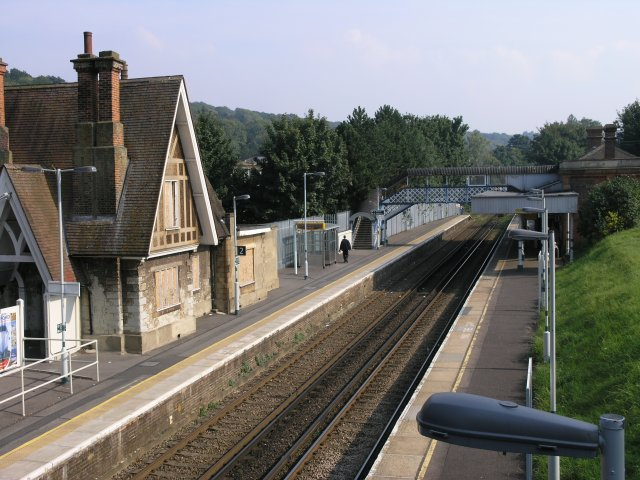
Kenley station, viewed from the road bridge on Hayes Lane

Kenley station was originally opened to passengers along with the line on 5 August 1856 as Coulsdon by the Caterham Railway. In November the same year, the station was renamed Kenley.

On Platform 2 stands a gabled Grade II listed building station house in the "Old English style of Domestic Architecture" (architect: Richard Whittall) and is similar to the original building at Caterham. This was the original station building which housed a small waiting room for passengers and the original ticket office. In 1899 when the Caterham line was made double-track, a new brick Ticket Office was built on the opposite Platform at road level. The original station house was disused and boarded up for a long time, but protected by its listed status. The house was then sold to a private owner in 2007 following refurbishment.

== Services ==
All services at Kenley are operated by Southern using Class 377 EMUs.

The typical off-peak service in trains per hour is:

- 2 tph to London Bridge (non-stop from Norwood Junction)
- 2 tph to Caterham

Up until September 2022 there were additional off-peak services to London Bridge via Norbury and Tulse Hill.

Preceding station	National Rail	Following station
Purley	Southern Caterham Line	Whyteleafe

== Connections ==
London Buses routes 407, 434 and 439 serve the station.
