= Whyteleafe South railway station =

National Rail station in Surrey, England

Whyteleafe South
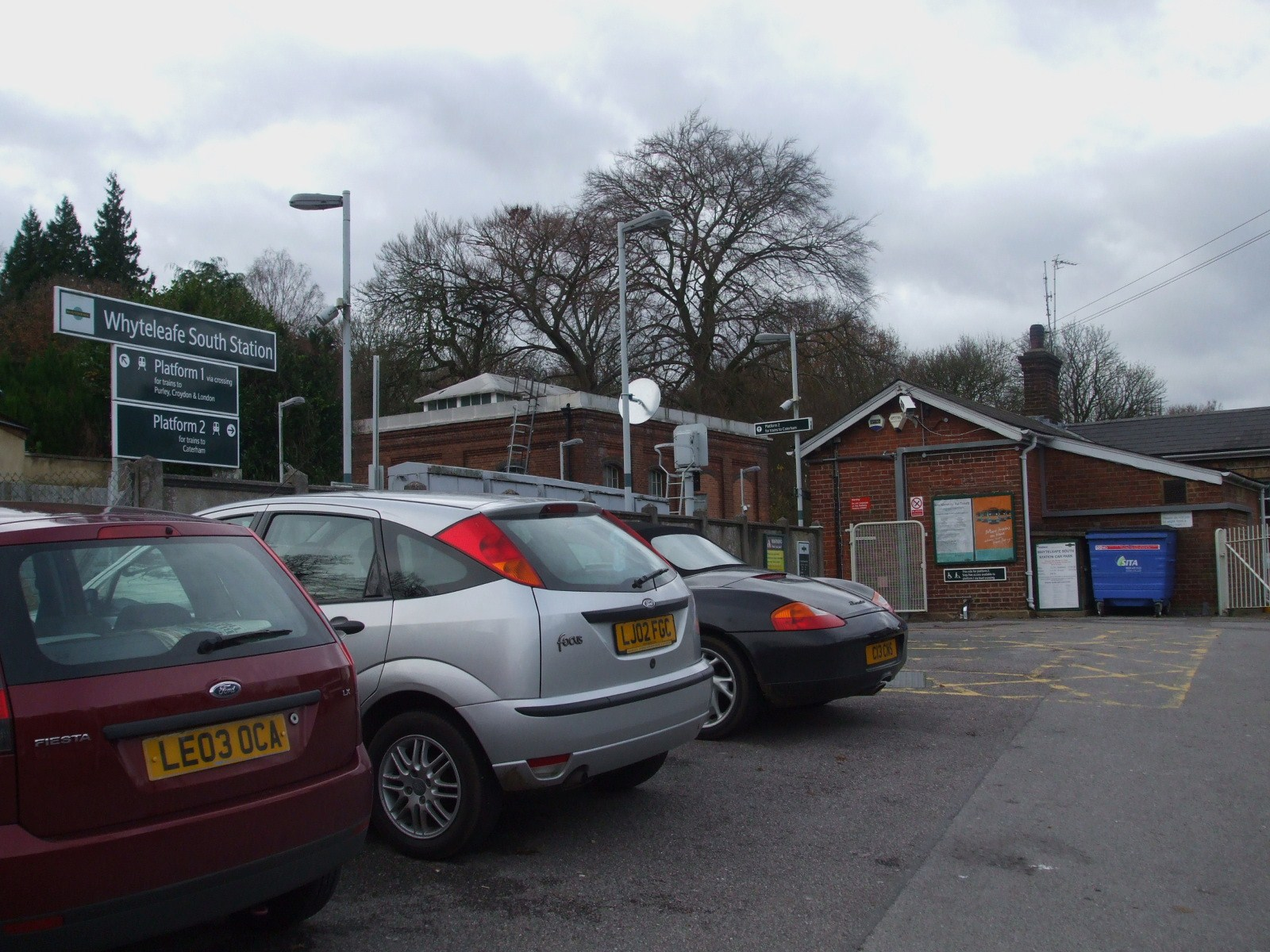
- Interactive map of Whyteleafe South

General information
- Location: Whyteleafe
- Local authority: District of Tandridge
- Managed by: Southern
- Station code: WHS
- DfT category: E
- Number of platforms: 2
- Accessible: Yes
- Fare zone: 6

National Rail annual entry and exit
- 2020–21: ▼35,618
- 2021–22: ▲85,152
- 2022–23: ▲0.104 million
- 2023–24: ▲0.112 million
- 2024–25: ▲0.115 million

Key dates
- 5 August 1856: Opened as Warlingham
- 11 June 1956: renamed Whyteleafe South

Other information
- External links: Departures; Facilities
- Coordinates: 51.303417°N 0.076833°W

Whyteleafe South railway station serves part of the suburban village of Whyteleafe in the district of Tandridge, Surrey, England. The station and all trains serving it are operated by Southern, and it is on the Caterham Line 18 miles 18 chains (29.3 km) from Charing Cross.

There are three railway stations in the village, the others being Whyteleafe, and Upper Warlingham on the Oxted Line. This station was named Warlingham until 11 June 1956; its single-storey main buildings are on the Down side. The narrow gabled station house still exists.

== Services ==
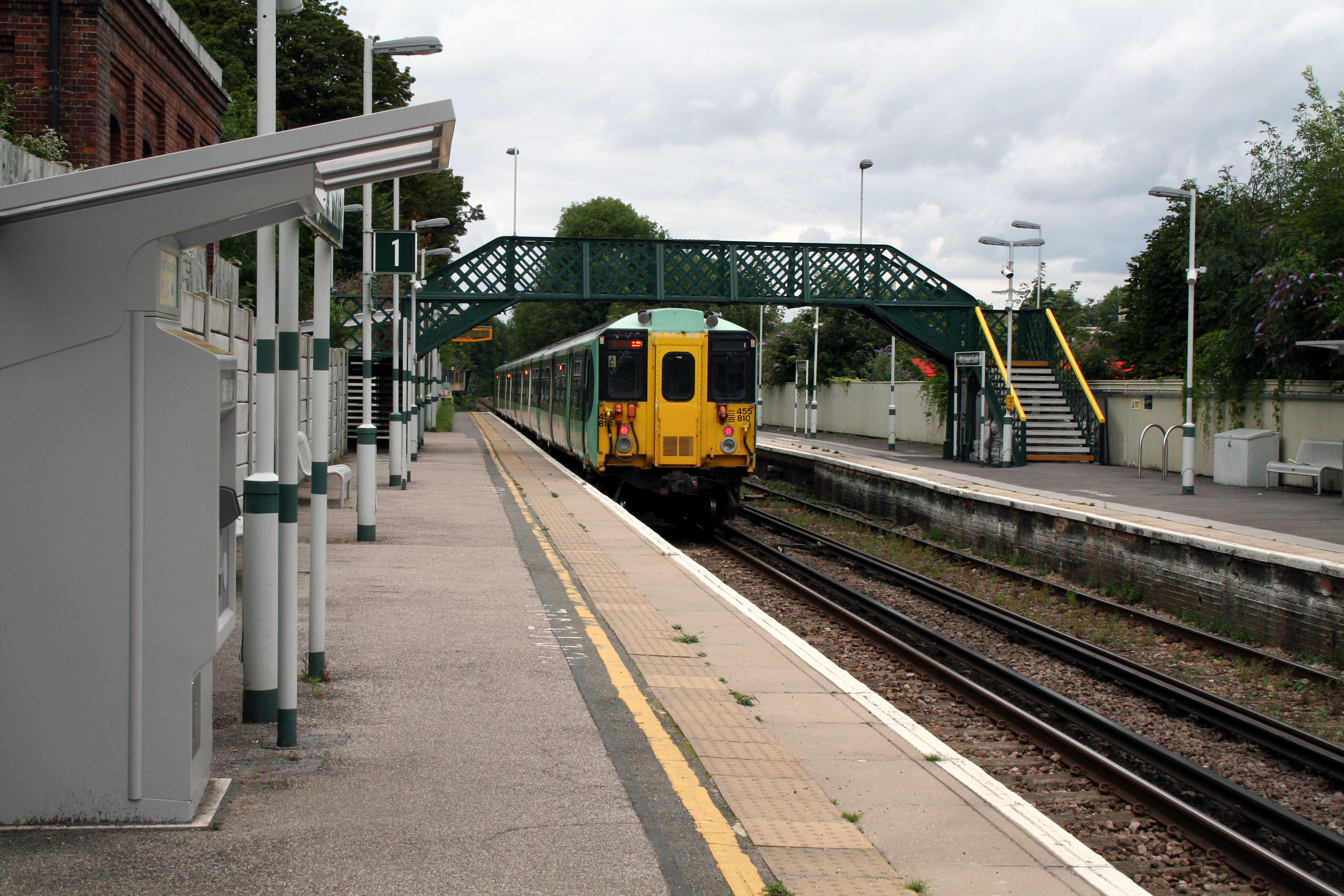
The station looking north

All services at Whyteleafe South are operated by Southern using Class 377 EMUs.

The typical off-peak service in trains per hour is:

- 2 tph to London Bridge (non-stop from Norwood Junction)
- 2 tph to Caterham

Up until September 2022 there were additional off-peak services to London Bridge via Norbury and Tulse Hill.

Preceding station	National Rail	Following station
Whyteleafe	Southern Caterham Line	Caterham
