= Caterham line =

Railway line in southeast England

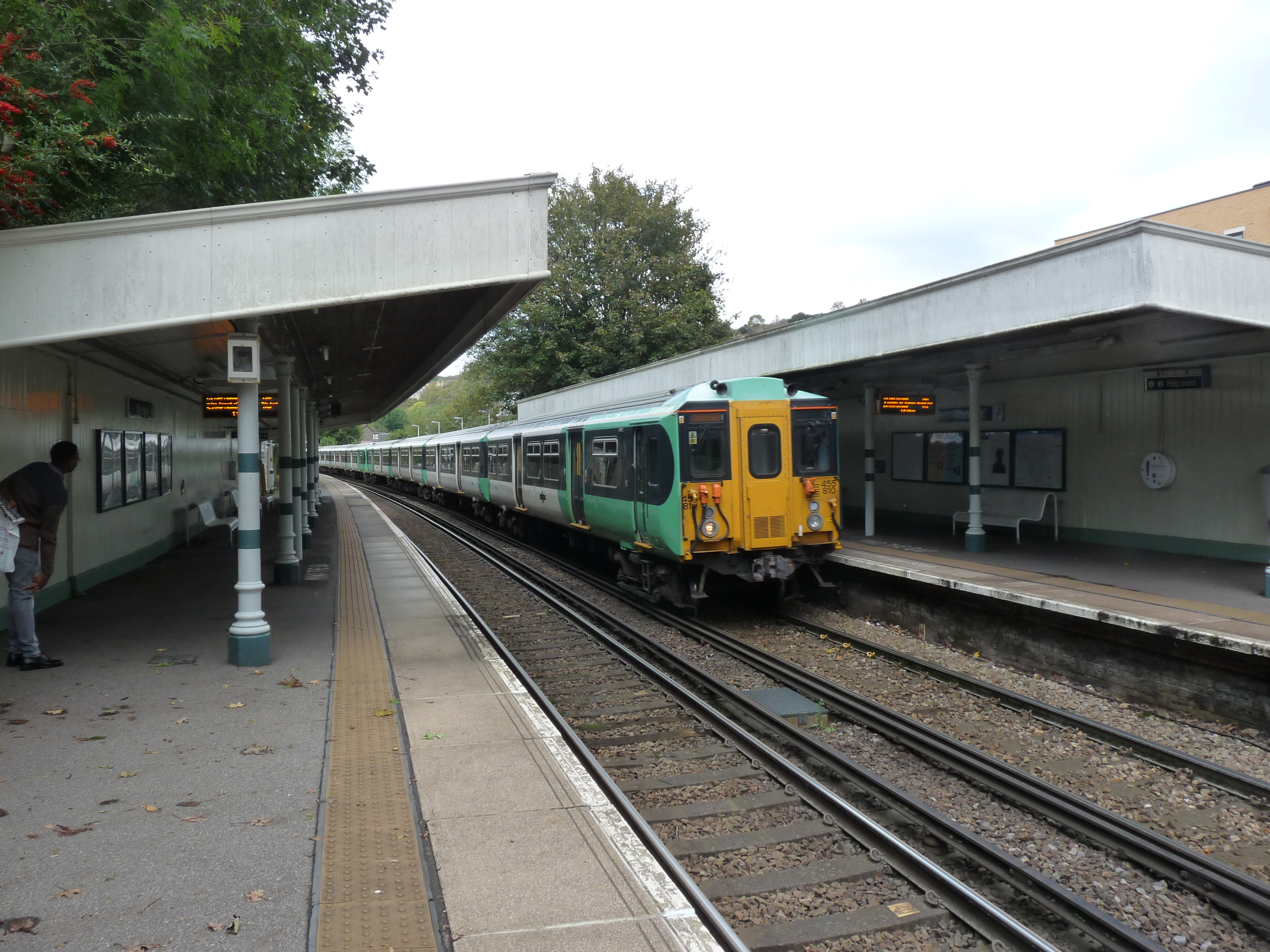
- A Southern Class 455 at Whyteleafe station in 2019

Overview
- Status: Operational
- Owner: Network Rail
- Locale: Greater London; Surrey
- Termini: London Bridge; Caterham
- Stations: Kenley; Whyteleafe; Whyteleafe south

Service
- Type: Commuter rail, Suburban rail
- System: National Rail
- Operator: Southern
- Rolling stock: Class 377 "Electrostar"
- Ridership: 2006–07 = 1.657 million ▲2007–08 = 1.843 million ▲2008–09 = 1.808 million ▼2009–10 = 1.799 million ▼2010–11 = 1.857 million ▲2011–12 = 1.936 million ▲

History
- Opened: 5 August 1856

Technical
- Track gauge: 1,435 mm (4 ft 8 1/2 in) standard gauge
- Electrification: 750 V DC third rail
Route map
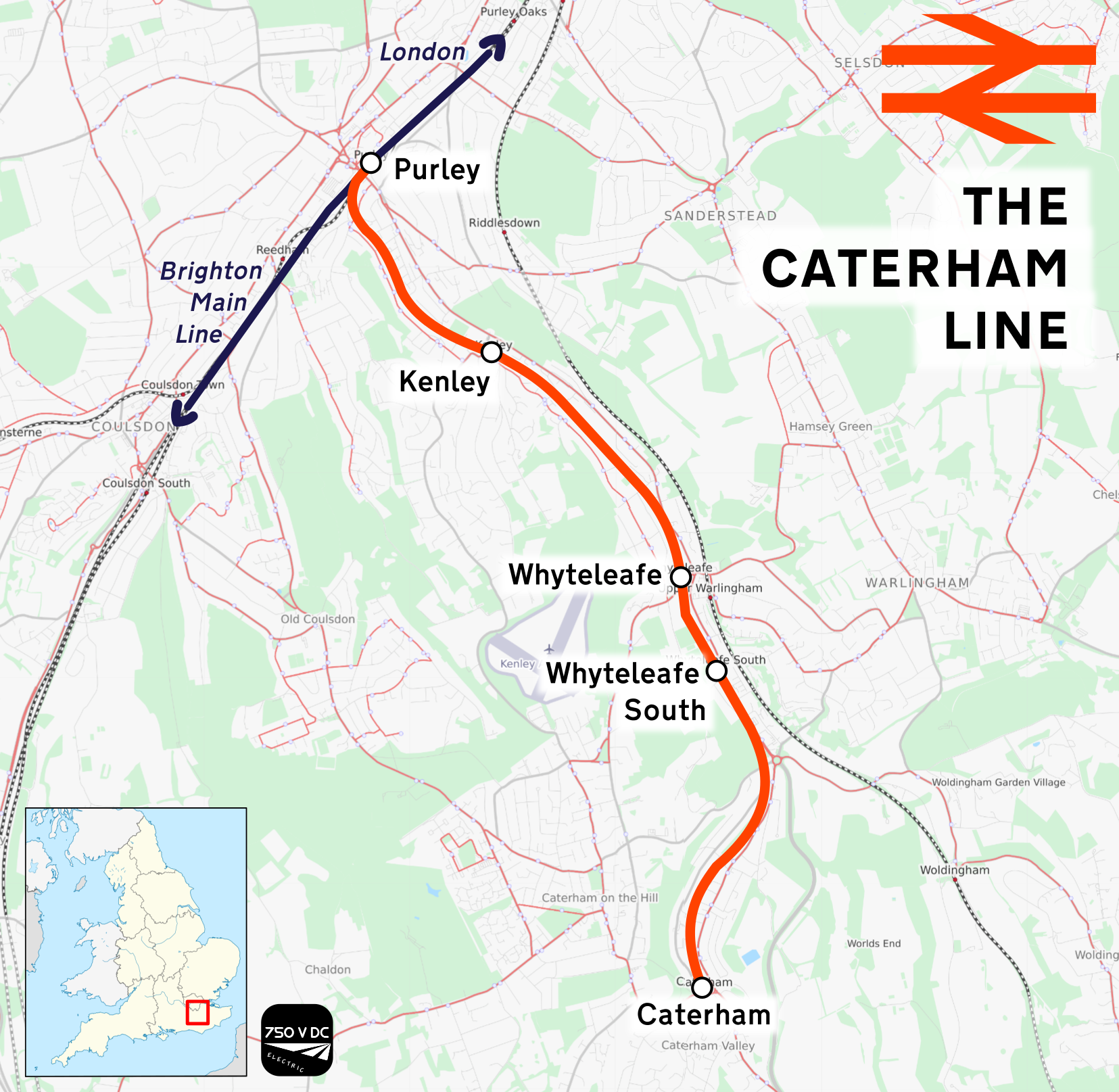

The Caterham line is a railway branch line running from Caterham in Surrey to Purley in South London. It operates as a commuter service to London.

The line was opened by local promoters as the Caterham Railway in 1856 primarily to convey firestone from quarries south of Caterham. There was intense rivalry and suspicion between the two main line railway companies at Purley, the London, Brighton and South Coast Railway (LBSCR) and the South Eastern Railway (SER), and this led to both of them obstructing successful operation of the Caterham Railway. In any case the local population was sparse and agricultural in character, and the Caterham Railway was loss-making.

It was acquired by the SER in 1859, but it was not until the latter years of the 19th century that residential development made the commercial situation of the line more buoyant. The line was doubled and a programme of station and infrastructure improvements was completed by 1900. The line was electrified in 1928.

After many years allied to the Central Division of the Southern Region of British Railways, the line is now operated by the Southern train operating company; a half-hourly service to London Bridge is operated.

== Infrastructure and services ==
The Caterham line is a railway line in Surrey and Greater London, England. It runs for 4 miles 40 ch (7.2 km) from its terminus at Caterham to an at-grade junction with the Brighton Main Line at Purley station, 15 mi 13 ch (24.4 km) down the line from London Charing Cross. There are intermediate stations at Kenley, Whyteleafe and Whyteleafe South. The Tattenham Corner line branches from the Caterham line 10 ch (200 m) south of Purley station. The maximum speed permitted on the branch is 60 mph (97 km/h). The line is electrified using the 750 V DC third-rail system and is double tracked throughout. Signalling is controlled from Three Bridges and Track Circuit Block is in operation. There are two level crossings on the line – one to the north and one to the south of Whyteleafe South station. The steepest gradient on the line, between Whyteleafe South and Caterham, is 1 in 90. The southern terminus is 131 m (430 ft) above ordnance datum.

The stations on the branch are managed by Southern, which operates all services. Purley has six operational platforms, of which three are connected to the Caterham line; the other four stations have two platforms each. (Note: Platform 2 at Whyteleafe South station is the shortest on the line with a length of 105.2 m (345 ft).) The buffer stops at Caterham are 19 miles 70 ch (32.0 km) down the line from London Charing Cross, when measured via Norwood Junction.

The off-peak service pattern is two trains per hour in each direction between Caterham and London Bridge. At Purley, trains join with or split from a train travelling to or from Tattenham Corner. Most trains serve all stations between East Croydon and Caterham, but run non-stop between London Bridge and East Croydon. Off-peak trains from Caterham typically reach Purley on the Brighton Main Line in around 11 minutes and arrive at London Bridge in about 50 minutes. The entirety of the Tattenham Corner line is in Zone 6 of the London fare zones.

Stations on the Caterham line (ordered from north to south)
Station	Distance from Charing Cross via Norwood Junction	Number of platforms	Opening date	Original name	Ref.
Purley	15 mi 13 ch (24.4 km)	6 (3 for branch)	12 July 1841	Godstone Road	
Kenley	16 mi 29 ch (26.3 km)	2	5 August 1856	Coulsdon	
Whyteleafe	17 mi 58 ch (28.5 km)	2	1 January 1900		
Whyteleafe South	18 mi 18 ch (29.3 km)	2	5 August 1856	Warlingham	
Caterham	19 mi 70 ch (32.0 km)	2	5 August 1856		

== History ==
=== Proposal and authorisation ===
A railway line to Caterham was proposed by local residents in the early 1850s. The primary aim was to transport stone from the quarries in the North Downs, around 1.5 mi (2.4 km) to the south of the town, and providing a passenger service was a secondary concern. (Note: In 1851, Caterham had a total population of under 500 people and the surrounding, sparsely populated area was primarily agricultural land.) The first surviving record of the proposal is a letter written to the London, Brighton and South Coast Railway (LB&SCR) in October 1853, in which the promoters of the line note that the South Eastern Railway (SER) had not objected to the scheme.

Five years earlier, in July 1848, the SER and LB&SCR had agreed to divide south east England, to separate their operations and to prevent unnecessary conflict. As the Caterham Railway (CR) would be built to the east of the Brighton Main Line, it was in the territory of the SER, but the proposed line required the use of the LB&SCR Godstone Road station (now Purley). An added complication was that this station had been closed by the LB&SCR on 30 September 1847. The local railway historian, Jeoffry Spence, notes "the acrimonious and internecine warfare" between the SER and LB&SCR at this time and states that the two larger companies "spared no efforts to bring the history of their unfortunate victim [the CR] to a premature conclusion."

Caterham Railway Act 1854
- Act of Parliament
- Parliament of the United Kingdom
- Long title: An Act for making a Railway from the London, Brighton, and South Coast Railway to Caterham in the County of Surrey.
- Citation: 17 & 18 Vict. c. lxviii

Dates
- Royal assent: 16 June 1854

Neither the LB&SCR nor the SER objected to the CR proposal, but they provided no support in presenting the plans to Parliament. The CR was granted an authorisation in the Caterham Railway Act 1854 (17 & 18 Vict. c. lxviii) to construct its line on 16 June 1854. A condition of the act was that the CR was not to cross the Brighton Main Line or to otherwise interfere with the operations and property of the LB&SCR.

=== Construction and opening ===
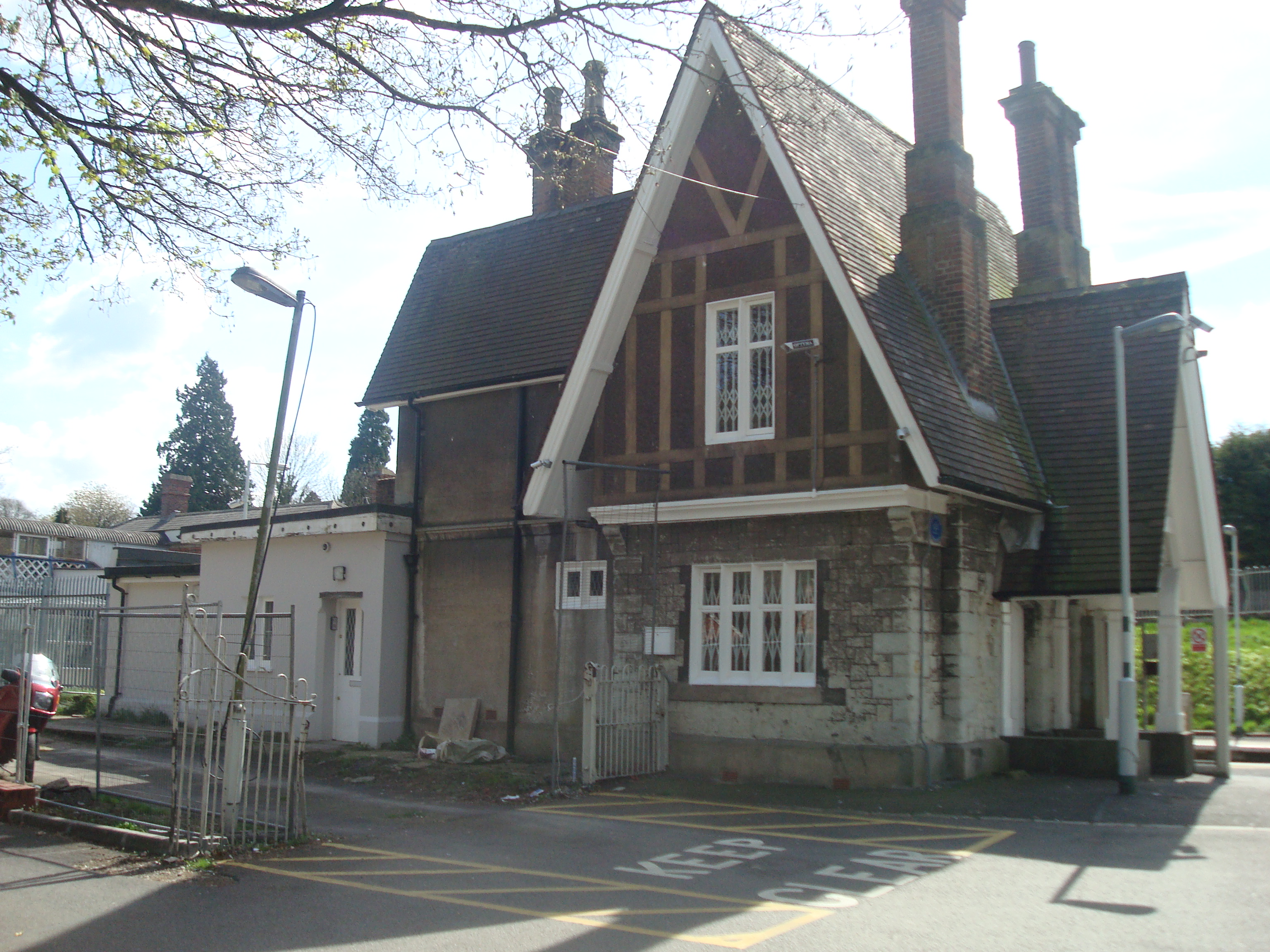
Former stationmaster's house at Kenley

Construction of the Caterham line began with a formal ceremony on 5 March 1855. The line was built by the contractors, Furness and Fernandez, who were promised £19,000 for their work. The stations were designed by Richard Whittall in the cottage orné style with steep gables, patterned-tile roofs and a half-timbered upper storey, resembling the station buildings at Betchworth and Chilworth. The Caterham line was declared "ready for traffic" on 21 September 1855, but disputes with the other railway companies prevented it from opening for almost twelve months.

By March 1855, SER shareholders were becoming increasingly concerned that the CR would attract passengers from the Oxted and Westerham areas, who might otherwise have used Godstone and Edenbridge stations. There were suggestions that Alexander Beattie had a conflict of interest between his roles as an SER board member and CR chairman. The LB&SCR had also become hostile to the new line, repeatedly changing its requirements for the junction with the Brighton Main Line, refusing to reopen Godstone Road station and even asking the CR to build a new bridge over the Godstone Road, which was not required by the act of Parliament.

The SER offered to work the Caterham line in May 1856, in exchange for 110% of the cost of operation. The CR rejected these terms and the following month requested a lease of traction and rolling stock, so that it could operate the line itself. The SER refused and the CR approached the LB&SCR, securing daily use of "an engine and two or three carriages" in July 1856. At the start of the following month, the Railway Times noted that the delay in opening had been due to "political" reasons and expressed concerned over the high proposed fares.

Regular services on the single-track Caterham line began on 5 August 1856, the LB&SCR having agreed a few days earlier to allow Caterham passengers to change trains at the still-closed Godstone Road station. Two intermediate stations, Warlingham (now Whyteleafe South) and Coulsdon (now Kenley), opened on the same day. Four return services were provided on weekdays between Caterham and Godstone Road, with the SER and LB&SCR each providing connections to two services to London. Godstone Road (now Purley) was renamed "Caterham Junction" when it formally reopened in November 1856. (Note: Caterham Junction station was renamed "Purley" in 1888.)

=== Purchase by the SER and proposed extensions ===
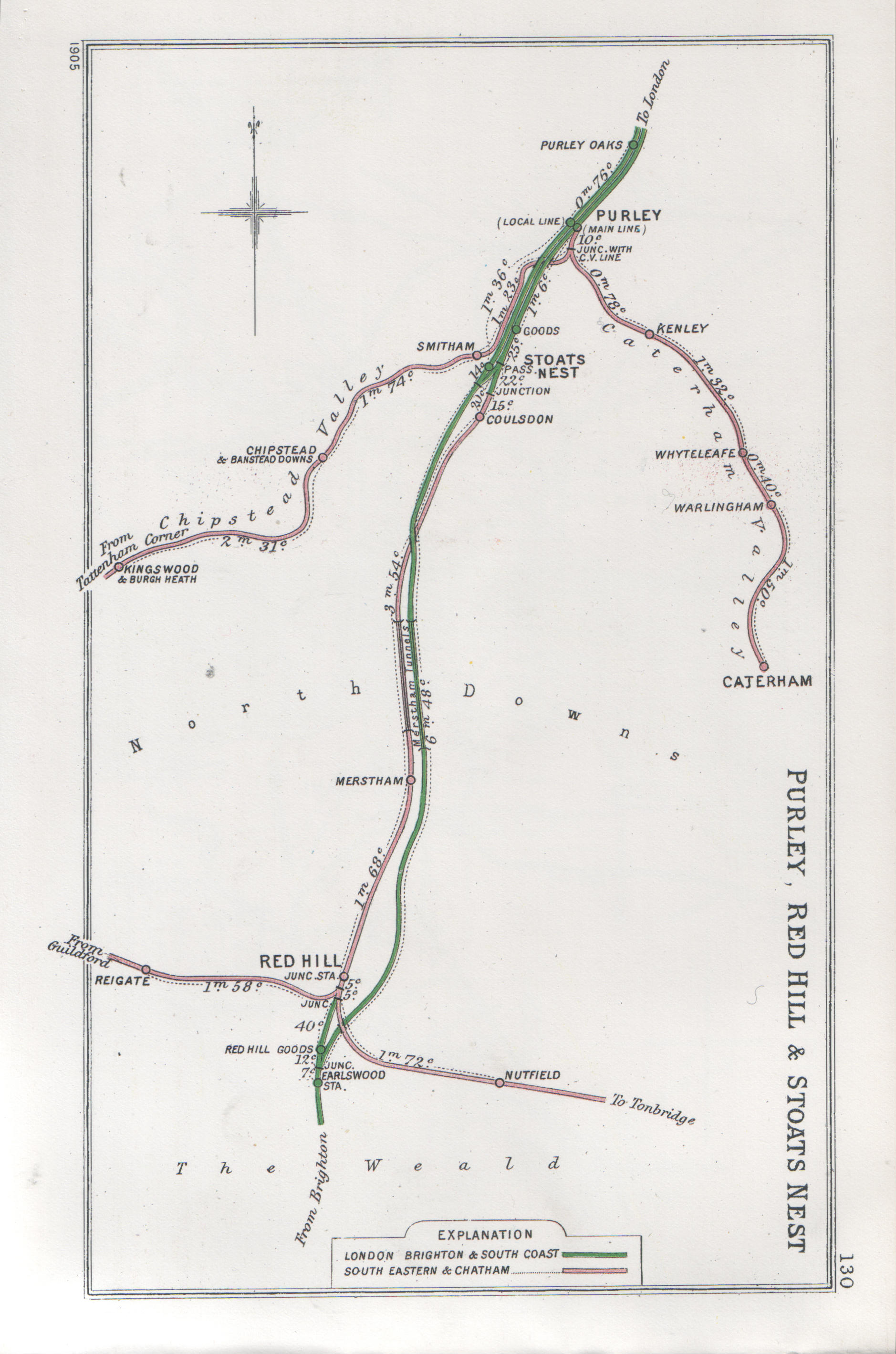
Railway Clearing House diagram showing the Caterham line (top right)

The difficult relationships between the CR, LB&SCR and SER continued after the Caterham line had opened. The trains operated by the two larger companies were inconveniently timed to allow connections to be made at Caterham Junction. In November 1856, the CR brought an unsuccessful case at the Court of Common Pleas to force improvements in the timetable, ticketing arrangements and passenger accommodation at the junction station.

In the first eleven months of its operation, the CR lost £846. The line nearly closed on 7 May 1857, because a payment to LB&SCR had not been made, but the sum was cleared before bankruptcy proceedings could begin. However, the following year, George Furness, one of the partners of the firm that had built the line, sued for non-payment of debt. He was awarded possession of the railway that July. He offered to sell the line to the SER for £16,000, but the company refused, saying that it would pay a maximum price of £12,000.

Caterham and South Eastern Railways Act 1859
- Act of Parliament
- Parliament of the United Kingdom
- Long title: An Act for the Transfer of the Caterham Railway to the South-eastern Railway Company, and for other Purposes.
- Citation: 22 & 23 Vict. c. xxxv

Dates
- Royal assent: 21 July 1859

In October 1858, the SER agreed to buy the line, but faced opposition from the LB&SCR in preparing the enabling bill for Parliament. The latter wanted to ban the SER from stopping at Caterham Junction, but a compromise was reached to allow SER passengers to change between mainline and branchline trains, but not to enter or leave the station. The acquisition of the CR by the SER was authorised by the Caterham and South Eastern Railways Act 1859 (22 & 23 Vict. c. xxxv) on 21 July 1859. The SER paid around £14,000 for the line – significantly less than its original construction cost of £30,000. The SER also made a payment to George Drew and Captain Wigsell for waiving their rights to stop trains on demand at Kenley.

Caterham and Godstone Valley Railway Act 1876
- Act of Parliament
- Parliament of the United Kingdom
- Long title: An Act for making a Railway in the County of Surrey to be called "The Caterham and Godstone Valley Railway."
- Citation: 39 & 40 Vict. c. xcix

Dates
- Royal assent: 13 July 1876

Text of statute as originally enacted

In the 1870s, there were several proposals to extend the line southwards from Caterham: An independent company suggested a line to Riverhead, via Oxted and Westerham; the SER wanted to run to Maidstone via a similar route; the Caterham and Godstone Valley Railway (C&GVR) proposed a line to Godstone. Of the three schemes, only the C&GVR received authorisation from Parliament, which was granted in the Caterham and Godstone Valley Railway Act 1876 (39 & 40 Vict. c. xcix). The line, which faced opposition from both the SER and the LB&SCR, required four tunnels through the hills to the south of Caterham to reach Godstone. The following year, the SER agreed to work the line in exchange for 50% of revenue, but construction work never began. The opening of the Oxted line in 1884 reduced the financial incentive to extend the Caterham line southwards and no further schemes were proposed thereafter.

=== Later history ===
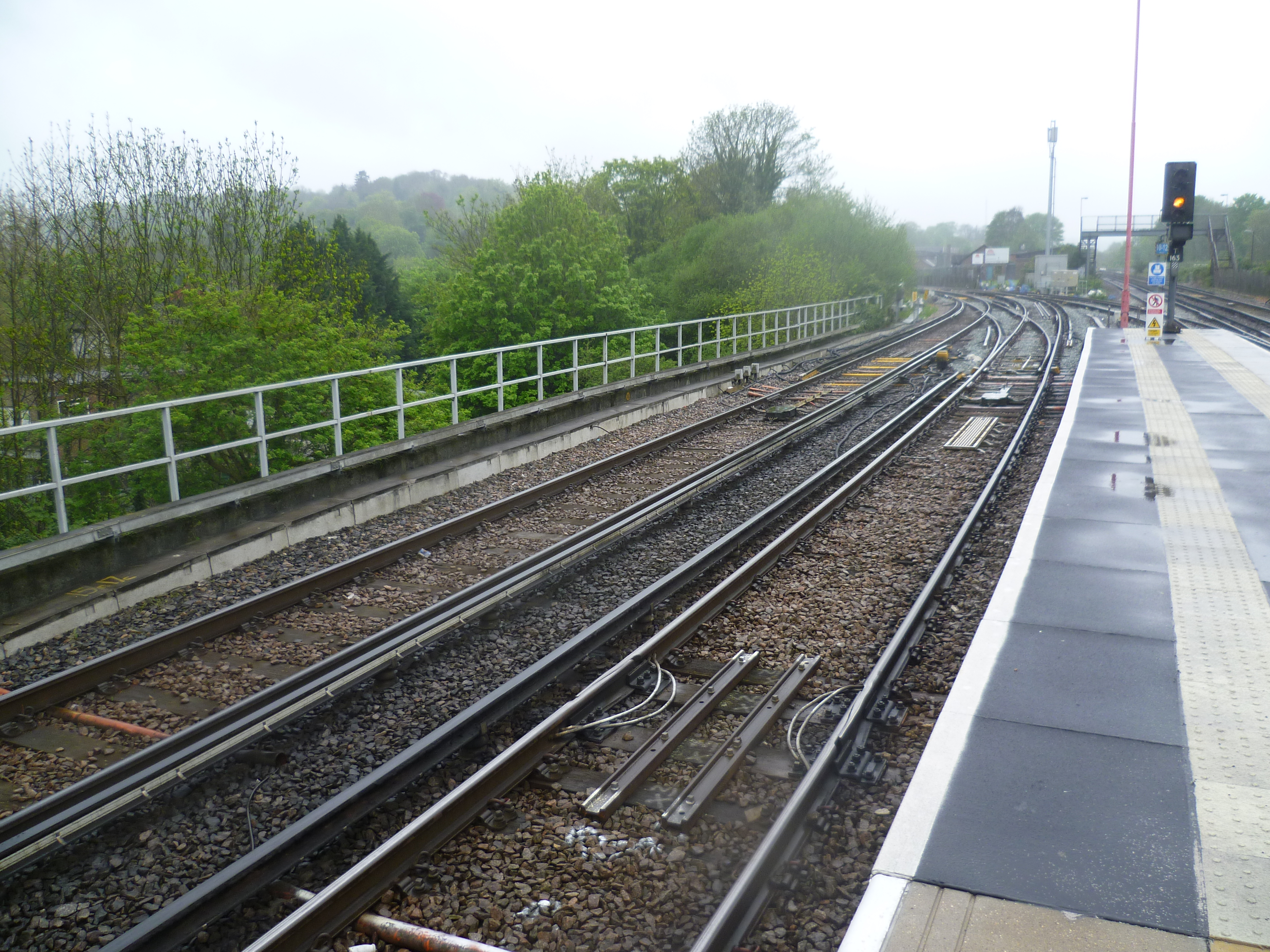
Looking south from Platform 5 at Purley. The Caterham line (left) curves away from the Brighton Main Line.

The junction with the Brighton Main Line at Purley was reconfigured in 1897, in part to accommodate services on the Tattenham Corner line, the first section of which opened in November that year. Between 1897 and 1899, the entire length of the Caterham line was doubled and Whyteleafe station was opened on 1 January 1900. Caterham station was rebuilt in 1900, with a wider island platform, a new station building and a larger goods yard. The infrastructure improvements stimulated development of the local area. A hotel opened opposite the terminus in 1902 and, by 1910, a small settlement, known as Caterham Valley, had grown up around it. Houses were built on the Domeywood Estate, around 1/2 mi (0.80 km) from Caterham station, in the mid-late 1930s.

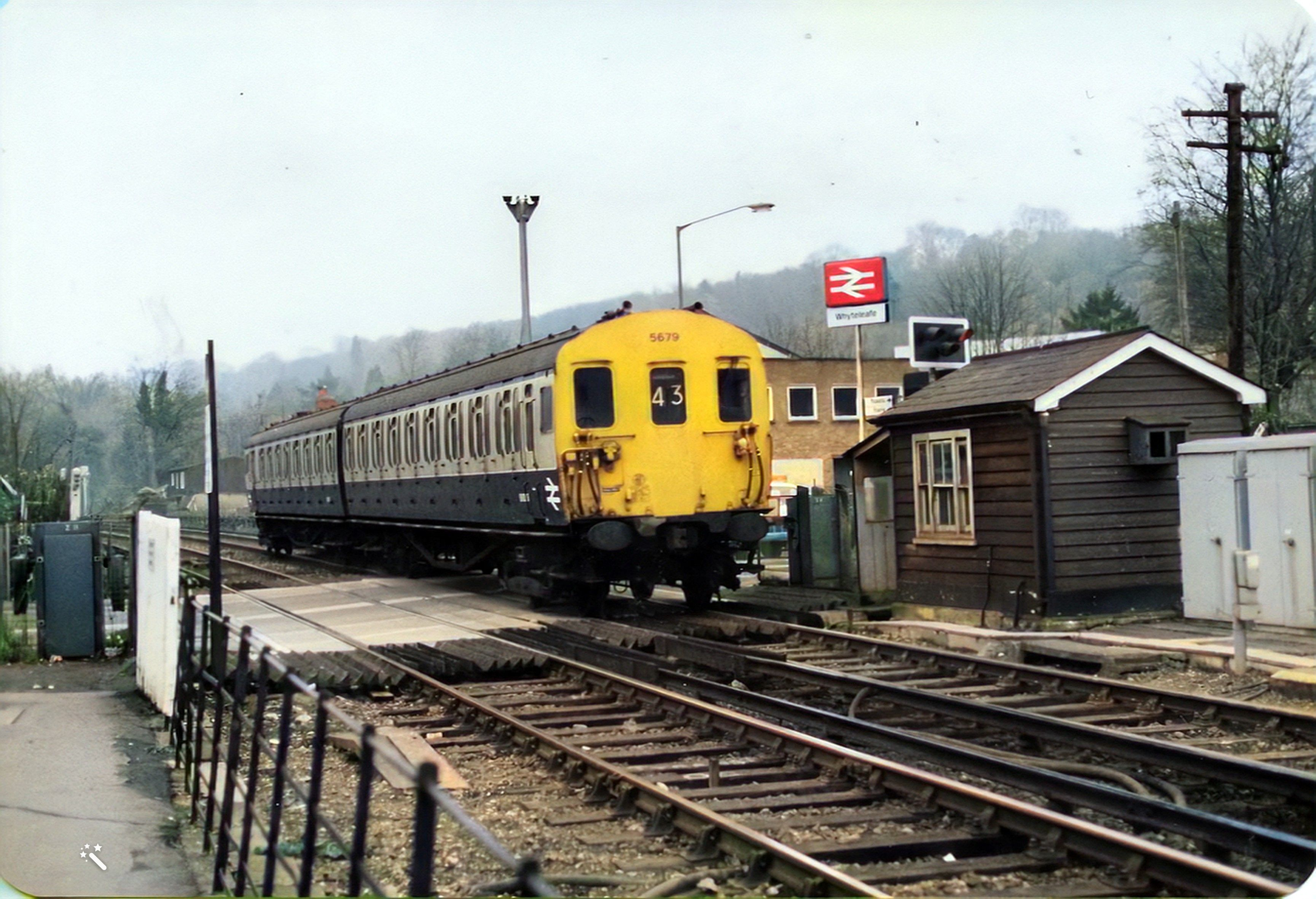
A Class 416 approaches Whyteleafe from Caterham in 1982

The Caterham line was included in the first phase of the Southern Railway DC electrification scheme. Electric trains began running on 25 March 1928. For the first three months, these services ran to the previous steam-hauled schedule, but a new timetable began on 17 June, doubling the frequency of trains. Portion working was introduced, allowing units from Caterham and Tattenham Corner to join at Purley, before continuing as one train to Charing Cross. Initially, three-coach electrical multiple units were used, which had been created from SER carriages. In 1952, Class 414 and Class 416 units were introduced to the line.

Goods services to Kenley ceased on 3 April 1961 and the yards at Whyteleafe and Caterham closed on 28 September 1964. The resulting redundant railway land at the terminus was sold that year.

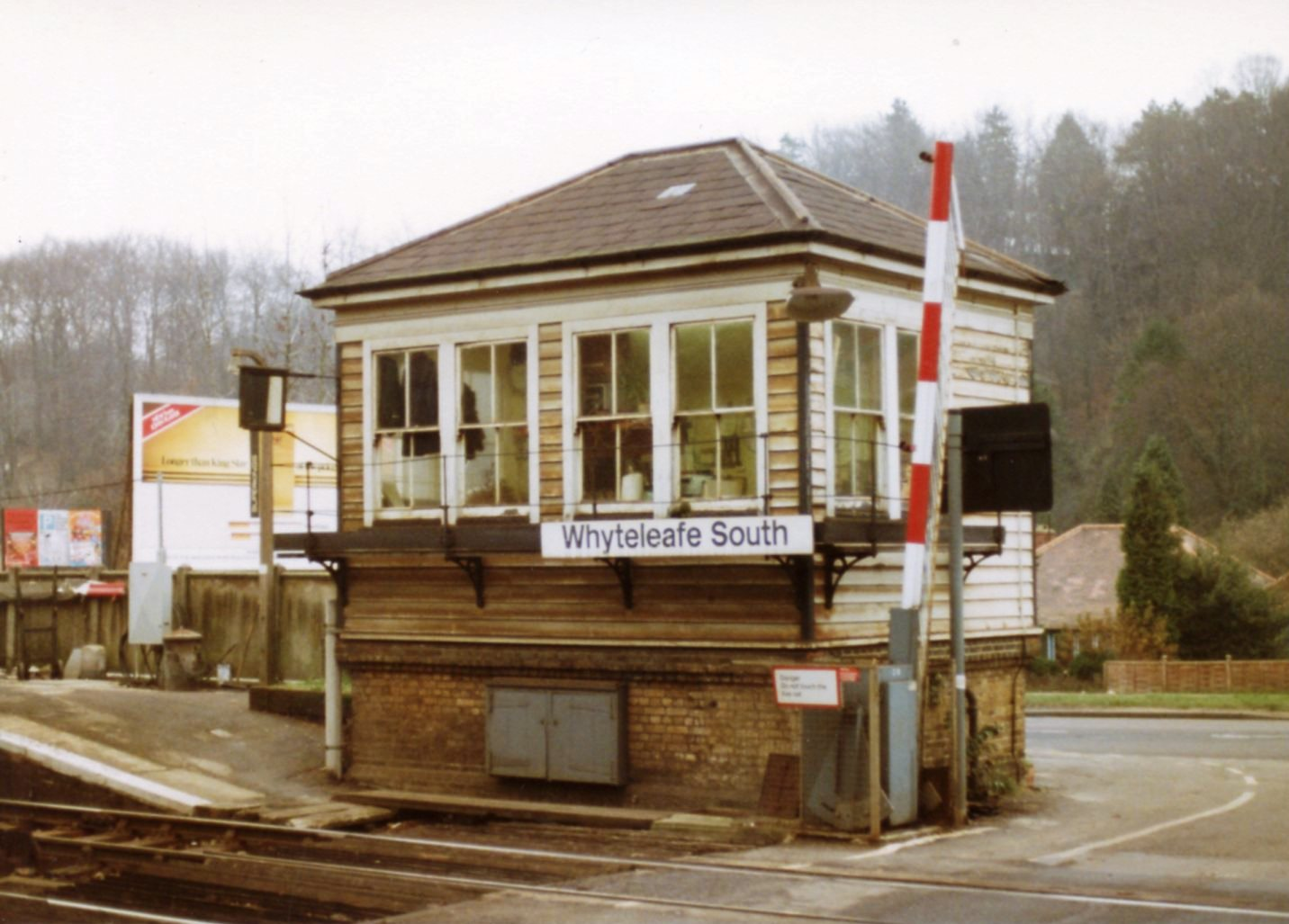
Whyteleafe South signal box closed on 19 December 1982.

Colour light signalling on the line was commissioned on 25 September 1983, the day that Caterham signal box closed. Purley signal box controlled the line for the next four months, until its closure in mid-January 1984, when control was transferred to Three Bridges area signalling centre.

== Bibliography ==
- Brown, David (2009). Development of the London Suburban Network and Its Trains. Southern Electric. Vol. 1. Crowthorne: Capital Transport Publishing. ISBN 978-1-85-414330-3.
- Brown, David (2010). Main line electrification, the war years and British Railways. Southern Electric. Vol. 2. Crowthorne: Capital Transport Publishing. ISBN 978-1-85-414340-2.
- Gray, Adrian (1990). South Eastern Railway. Midhurst: Middleton Press. ISBN 978-0-90-652085-7.
- Hornby, Frank (1995). London Suburban. Peterborough: Silver Link Publishing. ISBN 978-1-85-794039-8.
- Jackson, Alan A. (1978). London's Local Railways. Newton Abbot: David & Charles. ISBN 978-0-71-537479-5.
- Jackson, Alan A. (1999). The railway in Surrey. Penryn: Atlantic Transport Publishers. ISBN 978-0-90-689990-8.
- Mitchell, Vic; Smith, Keith (1993). Caterham and Tattenham Corner. Midhurst: Middleton Press. ISBN 978-1-87-379325-1.
- Nock, O.S. (1971) [1961]. The South Eastern and Chatham Railway. Shepperton: Ian Allan. ISBN 978-0-71-100268-5.
- Oppitz, Leslie (1988). Surrey railways remembered. Newbury: Countryside Books. ISBN 978-1-85-306005-2.
- Quick, Michael (2023) [2001]. Railway Passenger Stations in Great Britain (PDF) (5.05 ed.). London: Railway and Canal Historical Society.
- Spence, Jeoffry (1986) [1952]. The Caterham Railway (2nd ed.). Headington: Oakwood Press. ISBN 978-0-85-361325-1.
- Turner, J.T. Howard (1978). The London, Brighton & South Coast Railway. Vol. 2 : Establishment and growth. London: B.T. Batford. ISBN 978-0-71-341198-0.
- White, H.P. (1992) [1961]. Southern England. A regional history of the railways of Great Britain. Vol. 2 (5th ed.). Redwood Press. ISBN 978-0-94-653777-8.
- "Kent / Sussex / Wessex Routes Sectional Appendix" (PDF). Network Rail. 2009.
- "Delivering a better railway for a better Britain | Route Specifications: South East" (PDF). Network Rail. 2016.
