= Riddlesdown railway station =

National Rail station in London, England

Riddlesdown
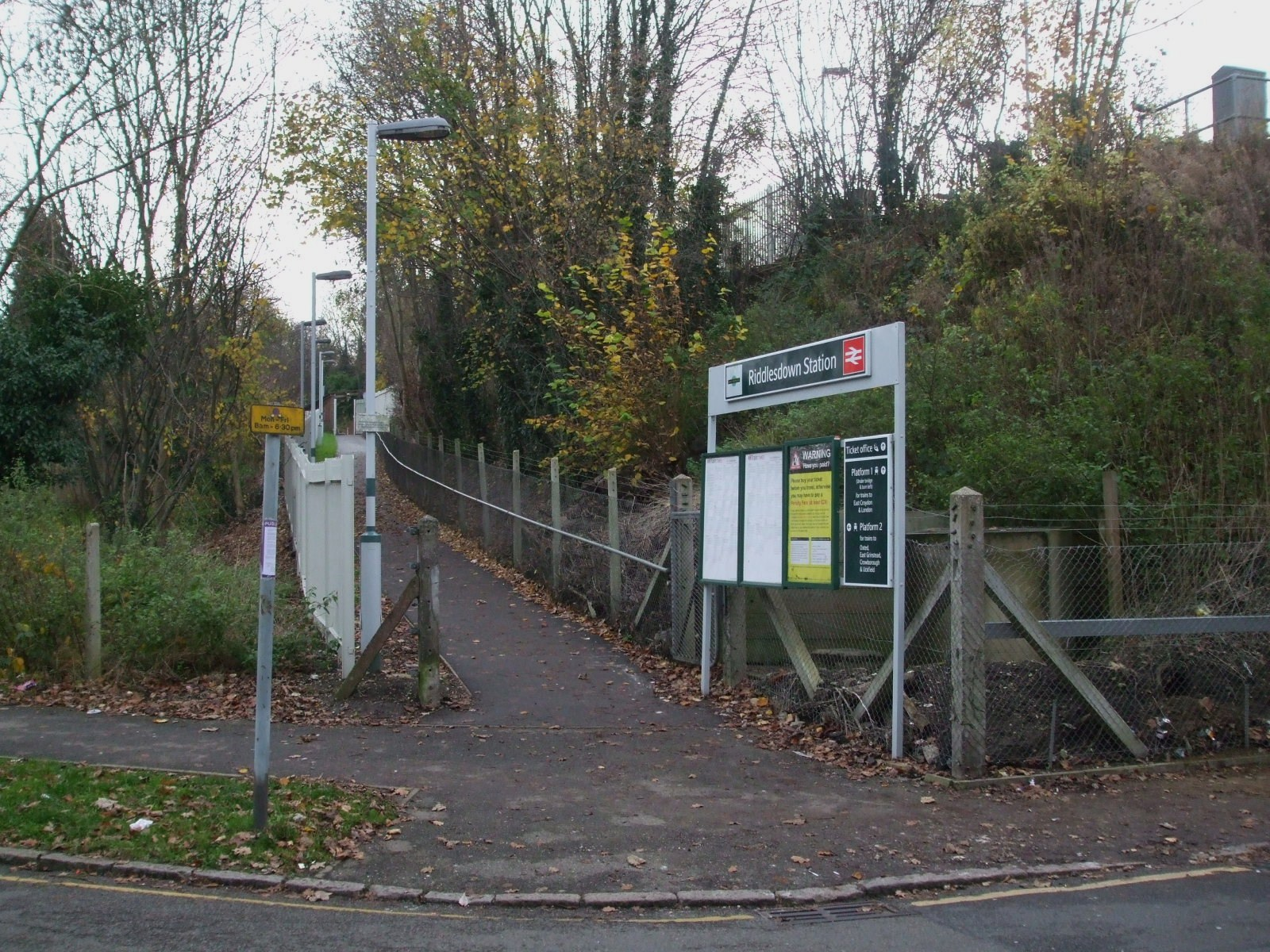
- Riddlesdown station eastern entrance and path
- Interactive map of Riddlesdown

General information
- Location: Riddlesdown
- Local authority: London Borough of Croydon
- Managed by: Southern
- Station code: RDD
- DfT category: E
- Number of platforms: 2
- Fare zone: 6

National Rail annual entry and exit
- 2020–21: ▼71,042
- 2021–22: ▲0.175 million
- 2022–23: ▲0.221 million
- 2023–24: ▲0.269 million
- 2024–25: ▲0.287 million

Railway companies
- Original company: Southern Railway

Key dates
- 5 June 1927: Opened

Other information
- External links: Departures; Facilities
- Coordinates: 51.3324°N 0.0994°W

Riddlesdown railway station is on the Oxted line serving Riddlesdown in the London Borough of Croydon, south London. It is in London fare zone 6, 13 miles 38 chains (13.48 miles, 21.69 km) from London Bridge, although off peak trains run to and from London Victoria. It is managed by Southern.

== History ==
The Oxted line was opened in stages by different companies; Riddlesdown lies on the portion between South Croydon and Crowhurst Junction (to the south of Hurst Green), which was authorised in 1878 and opened on 10 March 1884 by the Croydon and Oxted Joint Railway. Riddlesdown was not one of the original stations on the line – it was opened by the Southern Railway on 5 June 1927.

== Platforms ==
There are two platforms, each of which is long enough for an eight-car train. When the station first opened, lighting was by gas. Electric lighting had been installed by April 1960.

Platform 1 is the platform for trains towards Croydon and London.

Platform 2 is the platform towards East Grinstead.

The station is unusual amongst suburban London stations in that there is no means of crossing between the platforms. The platforms are reached via separate footpaths from Lower Barn Road, either side of the bridge that takes the railway over the road.

On the London-bound platform 1, there is a staffed ticket office (open for only part of the day) and waiting room.

There are self-service ticket machines and Oyster scanners on both platforms.

To the south of the station is the northern portal of Riddlesdown Tunnel, which is 837 yards (765 m) long.

== Services ==
Off-peak, all services at Riddlesdown are operated by Southern using Class 377 EMUs.

The typical off-peak service in trains per hour is:

- 2 tph to London Victoria
- 2 tph to East Grinstead via Oxted

During the middle of the day on Mondays and Tuesdays, this service is reduced to one train per hour.

During the peak hours, there are also Thameslink operated services between East Grinstead, London Bridge and Bedford. These services are operated using Class 700 EMUs.

Preceding station	National Rail	Following station
Sanderstead	Southern Oxted Line	Upper Warlingham
Sanderstead	Thameslink Bedford to East Grinstead Peak Hours Only	Upper Warlingham
	Historical railways	
Sanderstead; Line and station open	Southern Railway; Croydon & Oxted Joint Railway	Upper Warlingham; Line and station open
