= Whyteleafe railway station =

National Rail station in London, England

Whyteleafe
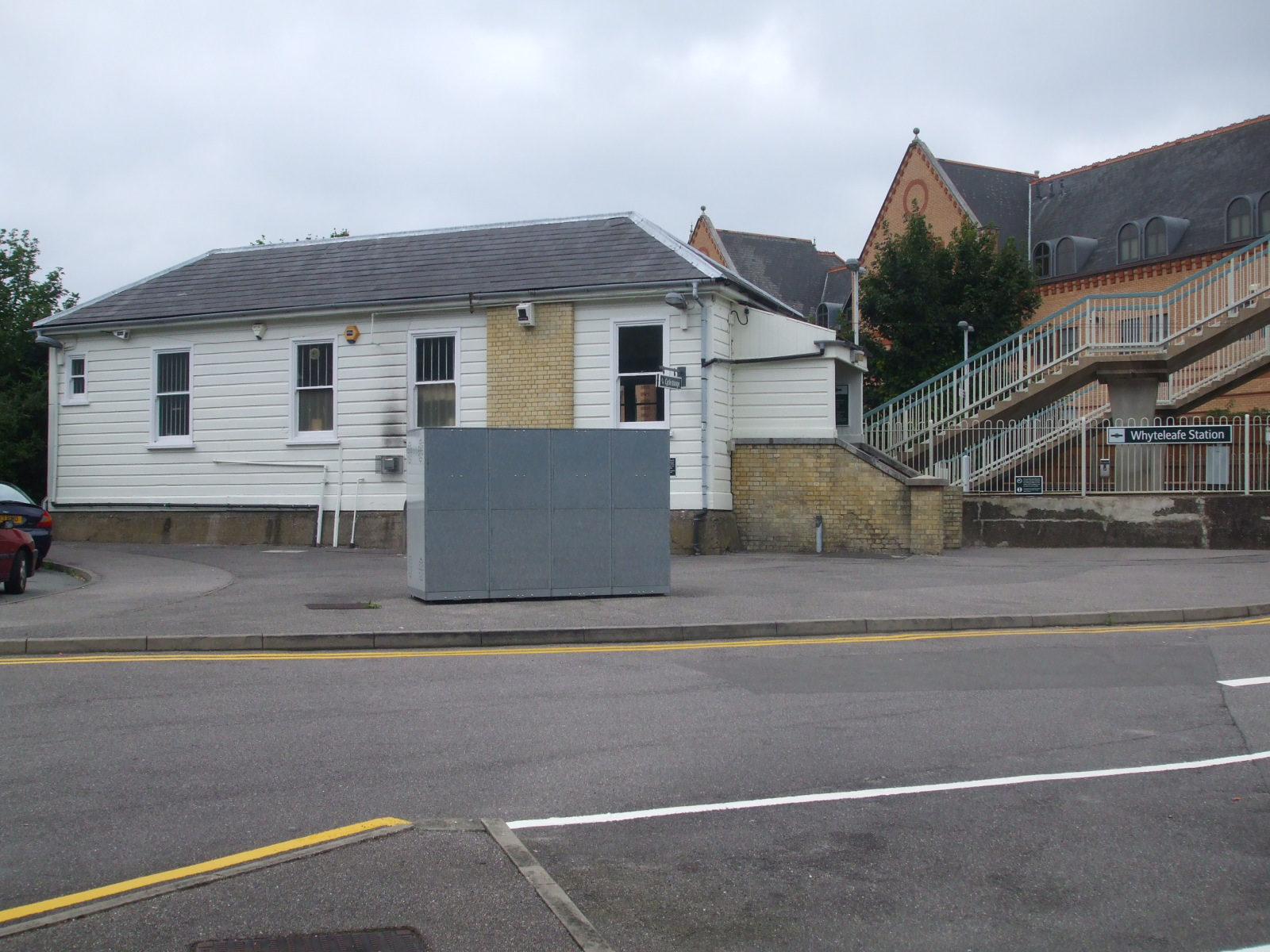
- Interactive map of Whyteleafe

General information
- Location: Whyteleafe
- Local authority: District of Tandridge
- Managed by: Southern
- Station code: WHY
- DfT category: E
- Number of platforms: 2
- Accessible: Yes
- Fare zone: 6
- OSI: Upper Warlingham

National Rail annual entry and exit
- 2020–21: ▼80,418
- 2021–22: ▲0.202 million
- 2022–23: ▲0.233 million
- 2023–24: ▼0.217 million
- 2024–25: ▲0.228 million

Key dates
- 1 January 1900: Opened

Other information
- External links: Departures; Facilities
- Coordinates: 51.309778°N 0.081167°W

Whyteleafe railway station serves the village of Whyteleafe right on the border of Greater London and Surrey, England. It is 17 miles 58 chains (28.5 km) from Charing Cross. The station and all trains serving it are operated by Southern, and it is on the Caterham Line.

It is a short walk from Upper Warlingham railway station on the Oxted Line, which runs parallel to the Caterham Line for most of its length. The station, opened on 1 January 1900 (after the line), has a single-storey ticket office on the Up side, and a double barrier CCTV crossing at the country end of the station.

== Services ==
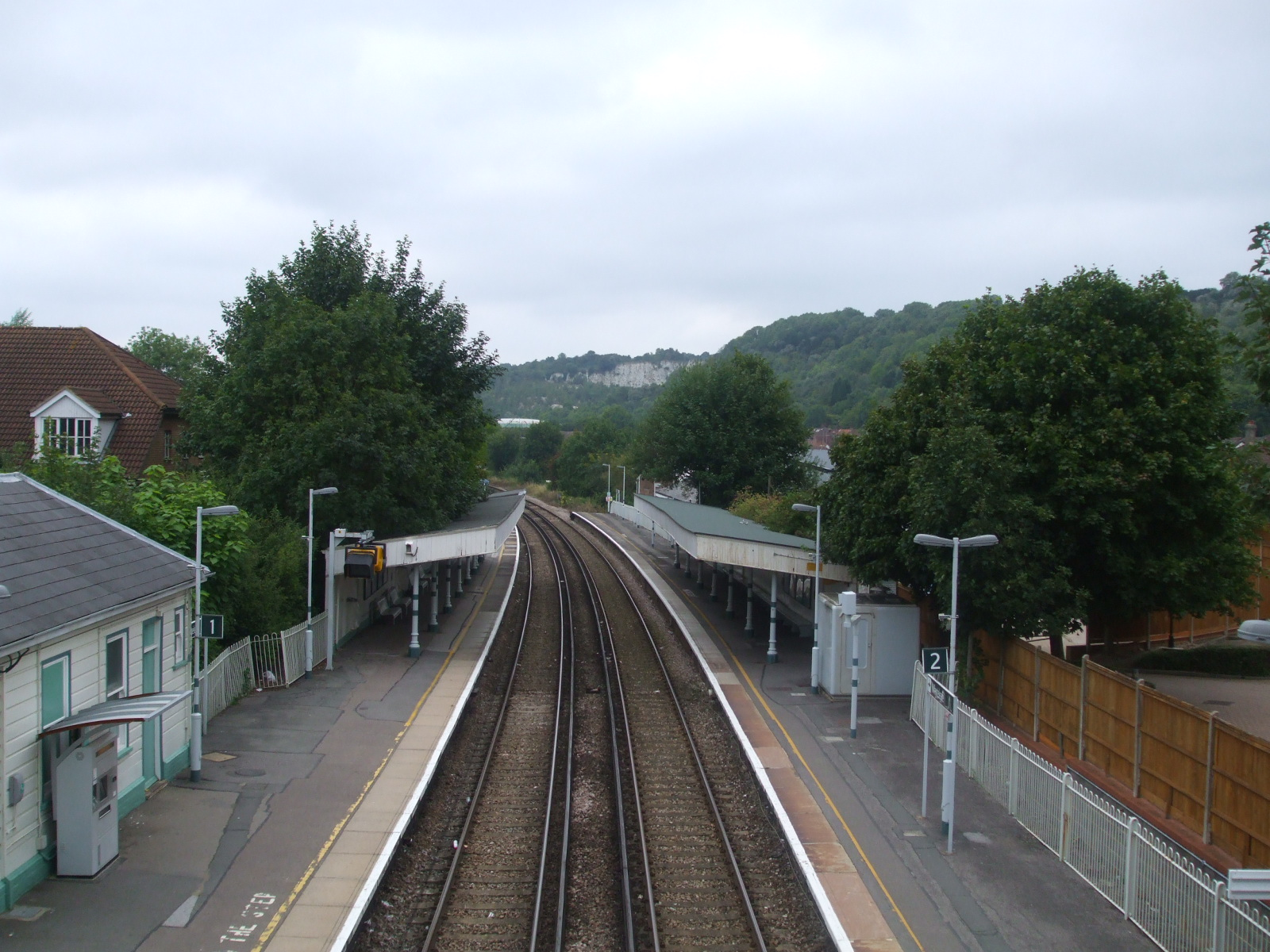
The station seen from the footbridge

All services at Whyteleafe are operated by Southern using Class 377 EMUs.

The typical off-peak service in trains per hour is:

- 2 tph to London Bridge (non-stop from Norwood Junction)
- 2 tph to Caterham

Up until September 2022 there were additional off-peak services to London Bridge via Norbury and Tulse Hill.

Preceding station	National Rail	Following station
Kenley	Southern Caterham Line	Whyteleafe South
