= Upper Warlingham railway station =

National Rail station in Surrey, England

Upper Warlingham
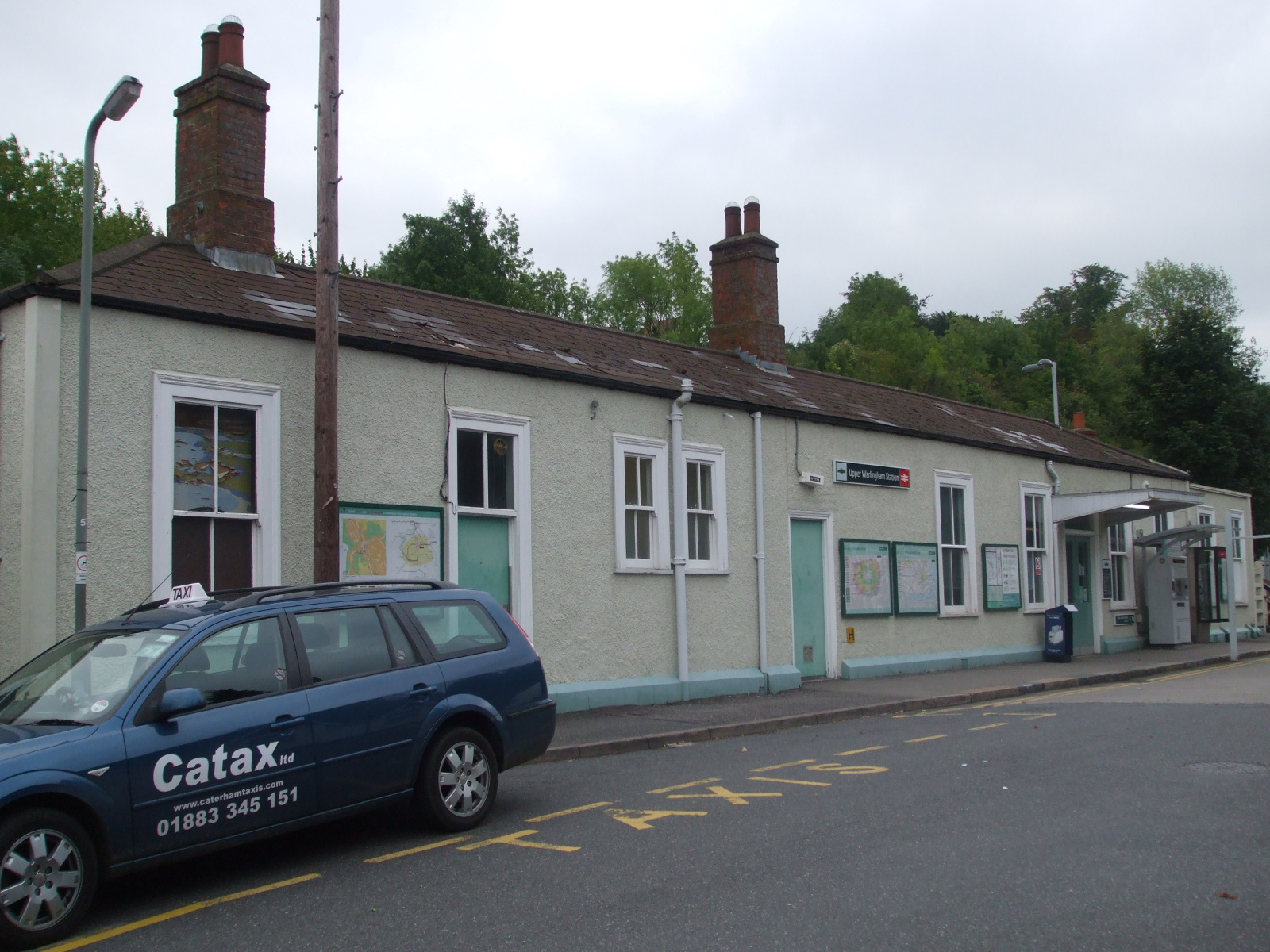
- Upper Warlingham railway station
- Interactive map of Upper Warlingham

General information
- Location: Whyteleafe
- Local authority: District of Tandridge
- Managed by: Southern
- Station code: UWL
- DfT category: D
- Number of platforms: 2
- Fare zone: 6
- OSI: Whyteleafe

National Rail annual entry and exit
- 2020–21: ▼0.195 million
- 2021–22: ▲0.501 million
- 2022–23: ▲0.630 million
- 2023–24: ▲0.792 million
- 2024–25: ▲0.851 million

Key dates
- 10 March 1884: Opened

Other information
- External links: Departures; Facilities
- Coordinates: 51.308556°N 0.078000°W

Upper Warlingham railway station is on the Oxted line serving Warlingham and Whyteleafe in Surrey, England. It is in London fare zone 6, 15 miles 33 chains (15.41 miles, 24.80 km) from London Bridge, although off peak trains run to and from London Victoria. The station is managed by Southern.

== Description ==
Train services are provided by Southern – the station is on the Oxted Line. The station is approximately 150m (geographically) from Whyteleafe railway station, to the north-west, which is on a nearby mainly parallel and shorter line from London, the Caterham Line.

On the London-bound platform, there is a ticket office. Outside the station is a self-service passenger-operated ticket machine with cash and contactless payments. There is a card only ticket machine located on platform 2.

The "Upper" prefix originated because what is now Whyteleafe South station on the Caterham line, approximately 600 yards (550 m) to the south west, was previously (until 1956) called Warlingham station and the prefix was originally necessary to differentiate them, Whyteleafe South station being lower down in the valley. The prefix survived the change in 1956.

The station is included in London Zone 6.

== Services ==
Off-peak, all services at Upper Warlingham are operated by Southern using Class 377 EMUs.

The typical off-peak service in trains per hour is:

- 1 tph to London Victoria
- 1 tph to East Grinstead via Oxted

During the peak hours and on weekends, the service is increased to 2 tph in each direction.

During the peak hours, there are also Thameslink operated services between East Grinstead, London Bridge and Bedford. These services are operated using Class 700 EMUs.

Preceding station	National Rail	Following station
Riddlesdown	Southern Oxted Line	Woldingham
Riddlesdown	Thameslink Bedford to East Grinstead Peak Hours Only	Woldingham
