= List of stations in London fare zone 6 =

Fare zone 6 is an outer zone of Transport for London's zonal fare system used for calculating the price of tickets for travel on the London Underground, London Overground, Docklands Light Railway (DLR), National Rail services (since 2007), and the Elizabeth line within Greater London. The zone was created on 6 January 1991. Previously, it formed part of zone 5, that was created as Outer zone 3c on 22 May 1983 and had been renamed on 8 January 1989. It extends from approximately 12–16 miles (19–26 km) from Piccadilly Circus.

== List of stations ==
The following stations are within zone 6:

Station	Local authority	Managed by	Notes
Banstead	Reigate and Banstead	Southern	Outside Greater London (Note: All stations in Greater London are in fare zones 1–6. Typically, stations beyond the boundary with Transport for London ticketing are in fares zones 7–9 or special fares apply.)
Barnehurst	Bexley	Southeastern	
Bexley	Bexley	Southeastern	
Caterham	Tandridge	Southern	Outside Greater London
Chelsfield	Bromley	Southeastern	
Chessington North	Kingston	South Western Railway	
Chessington South	Kingston	South Western Railway	
Chipstead	Reigate and Banstead	Southern	Outside Greater London
Coulsdon South	Croydon	Southern	
Coulsdon Town	Croydon	Southern	
Crayford	Bexley	Southeastern	
Crews Hill	Enfield	Great Northern	
Debden	Epping Forest	London Underground	Outside Greater London
Elm Park	Havering	London Underground	
Elstree & Borehamwood	Hertsmere	Thameslink	Outside Greater London
Emerson Park	Havering	London Overground	
Enfield Lock	Enfield	Greater Anglia	
Epping	Epping Forest	London Underground	Outside Greater London
Epsom Downs	Reigate and Banstead	Southern	Outside Greater London
Erith	Bexley	Southeastern	
Ewell East	Epsom and Ewell	Southern	Outside Greater London
Ewell West	Epsom and Ewell	South Western Railway	Outside Greater London
Feltham	Hounslow	South Western Railway	
Fulwell	Richmond	South Western Railway	
Gidea Park	Havering	Elizabeth line	
Hadley Wood	Enfield	Great Northern	
Hampton	Richmond	South Western Railway	
Hampton Court	Elmbridge	South Western Railway	Outside Greater London
Hampton Wick	Richmond	South Western Railway	
Harold Wood	Havering	Elizabeth line	
Hatch End	Harrow	London Overground	
Hatton Cross	Hillingdon	London Underground	Also in zone 5
Heathrow Terminals 2 & 3 Rail	Hillingdon	Heathrow Express	Restrictions apply (Note: Transport for London ticketing on Heathrow Express is limited to Oyster card and contactless pay-as-you-go.)
Heathrow Terminals 2 & 3 LU	Hillingdon	London Underground	
Heathrow Terminal 4 LU	Hillingdon	London Underground	
Heathrow Terminal 4 Rail	Hillingdon	Heathrow Express	Restrictions apply
Heathrow Terminal 5	Hillingdon	Heathrow Express	Restrictions apply
Hillingdon	Hillingdon	London Underground	
Hornchurch	Havering	London Underground	
Ickenham	Hillingdon	London Underground	
Kenley	Croydon	Southern	
Kingston	Kingston	South Western Railway	
Kingswood	Reigate and Banstead	Southern	Outside Greater London
Knockholt	Bromley	Southeastern	
Loughton	Epping Forest	London Underground	Outside Greater London
Moor Park	Three Rivers	London Underground	Outside Greater London; Also in zone 7
Northwood	Hillingdon	London Underground	
Northwood Hills	Hillingdon	London Underground	
Orpington	Bromley	Southeastern	
Purley	Croydon	Southern	
Purley Oaks	Croydon	Southern	
Rainham	Havering	c2c	
Reedham	Croydon	Southern	
Riddlesdown	Croydon	Southern	
Romford	Havering	Elizabeth line	
Ruislip	Hillingdon	London Underground	
Ruislip Manor	Hillingdon	London Underground	
Sanderstead	Croydon	Southern	
Slade Green	Bexley	Southeastern	
Surbiton	Kingston	South Western Railway	
St Mary Cray	Bromley	Southeastern	
Tadworth	Reigate and Banstead	Southern	Outside Greater London
Tattenham Corner	Reigate and Banstead	Southern	Outside Greater London
Teddington	Richmond	South Western Railway	
Thames Ditton	Elmbridge	South Western Railway	Outside Greater London
Theydon Bois	Epping Forest	London Underground	Outside Greater London
Turkey Street	Enfield	London Overground	
Upminster	Havering	c2c	
Upminster Bridge	Havering	London Underground	
Upper Warlingham	Tandridge	Southern	Outside Greater London
Uxbridge	Hillingdon	London Underground	
West Drayton	Hillingdon	Elizabeth line	
West Ruislip	Hillingdon	London Underground	
Whyteleafe	Tandridge	Southern	Outside Greater London
Whyteleafe South	Tandridge	Southern	Outside Greater London
Woodmansterne	Croydon	Southern	

== Changes ==
- January 1991: zone 6 created from part of zone 5
- January 1997: Debden, Theydon Bois and Epping from outside the zones to zone 6 and Moor Park from zone A to zone 6/A boundary
- January 2005: Cheam and Belmont from zone 6 to zone 5
- January 2006: Whyteleafe, Whyteleafe South, Caterham, Banstead, Epsom Downs, Tattenham Corner, Tadworth, Kingswood, Chipstead and Upper Warlingham from outside the zones to zone 6
- January 2007: Stoneleigh from zone 6 to zone 5 and Ewell East & Ewell West from outside the zones to zone 6
