= Riddlesdown =

Coordinates: 51.3313°N 0.0957°W

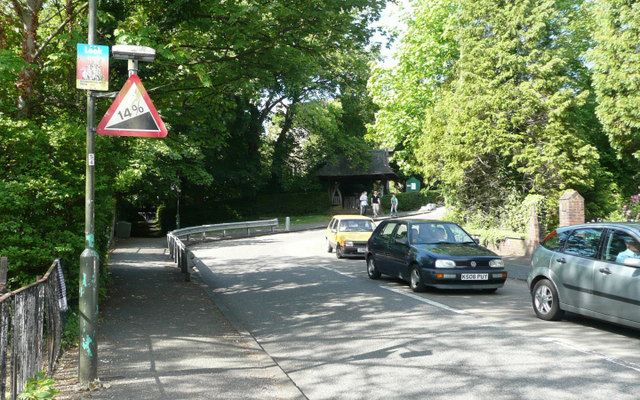
- St James Road, Riddlesdown

- Location within Greater London
- OS grid reference: TQ327608
- London borough: Croydon
- Ceremonial county: Greater London
- Region: London
- Country: England
- Sovereign state: United Kingdom
- Post town: PURLEY
- Postcode district: CR8
- Dialling code: 020
- Police: Metropolitan
- Fire: London
- Ambulance: London
- UK Parliament: Croydon South
- London Assembly: Croydon and Sutton

Riddlesdown is a place in the London Borough of Croydon, one mile east from the centre of its post town of Purley. The name applies to the residential district and to the green space maintained by the City of London Corporation which is also known as Riddlesdown Common.

== History ==
There is evidence of human activity in the area going back at least to Neolithic times. Neolithic tools such as scrapes and flakes, and Bronze Age celts have been discovered there. The "Riddle" part of the name is thought to come from the Middle English ridde leah, meaning "cleared woodland". The name has been referred to variously over time as Ridelesdowne (1331), Redele (1338), North Ridle (1422), Riddleys, North Riddeley (1461) and Riddles Down (1765).

== Local facilities ==
The Riddlesdown Lawn Tennis Club was opened by Fred Perry in June 1938. The club has 3 all weather tennis courts which were resurfaced in 2013. It is located on Lower Barn Road.

Most of the housing stock dates from the 1930s and was developed by John Laing plc. The design of some of the houses was influenced by the Art Deco style.

Riddlesdown Collegiate is a local authority secondary school in the area.

Riddlesdown railway station is located on Lower Barn Road with Southern Rail services to London Victoria and London Bridge.

== Nearest places ==
- Purley
- Kenley
- Sanderstead

== Transport links ==
- Riddlesdown railway station
- The London Buses route 412, which runs between Purley, town centre and West Croydon Bus Station
