= London fare zones =

Fare zone system managed by Transport for London

Route map of zonal system of the railway services directly managed by Transport for London. Stations only served by National Rail trains are not shown in this map.

Rail service fares in Greater London and the surrounding area are calculated in accordance with the London fare zones system managed by Transport for London. Within London, all London Underground, National Rail, London Overground, Elizabeth Line and Docklands Light Railway stations are assigned to six fare zones. (Note: Stations can be assigned to one or two fare zones) Fare zone 1 covers the central area and fare zones 2, 3, 4, 5 and 6 form concentric rings around it. Some National Rail stations and almost all Transport for London served stations outside Greater London in the home counties of Buckinghamshire, Essex, Hertfordshire and Surrey are either included in fare zones 4, 5 or 6 or in extended zones beyond these. Transport for London fare zones are also known simply as zones or travelcard zones, referring to their use in calculating prices for travelcards. London fare zones are also used for calculating the cost of single and return paper tickets on Transport for London services, National Rail single and return paper tickets within the London area, Oyster card and contactless pay-as-you-go fares and caps, and season tickets. The London Buses network used the fare zones system until 2004 when a London-wide flat-fare system was introduced.

== Background ==
Before the introduction of fare zones, tickets for rail travel in Greater London were purchased on a 'point-to-point' basis between two stations, either as a single, return or season ticket; and were priced according to distance travelled. During the early 1980s the London Transport Executive of the Greater London Council made a series of revisions to fares which introduced the fare zones. The purpose of creating zones was to simplify fares, in order to speed up the process of buying tickets. On buses this became necessary as conductors were being eliminated in favour of the driver selling tickets, which was having an impact on the time it took passengers to board the bus and therefore on journey times.

== History ==
The first zones were introduced on 4 October 1981 as part of the Fares Fair policy of the Greater London Council. For London Buses, the whole of Greater London was divided into four bus zones where flat fares applied. They were City, West End, Inner and Outer. On the London Underground, only the overlapping City and West End zones were advertised to the public. On 21 March 1982 fares to all other London Underground stations were graduated at three mile intervals, effectively creating zones, although they were not named as such. During 1982, outer zonal boundaries for public use were being developed.

The weekly, monthly and annual Travelcard was launched on Sunday 22 May 1983. To coincide with this, the City and West End zones were combined into a new Central zone 1 (coloured blue on maps) for both London Buses and London Underground. The existing Inner bus zone became Inner zone 2 (green on maps). That was surrounded by the rings of Outer zones 3a, 3b and 3c (all coloured orange on maps). These five zones covered all London Underground stations within Greater London. 3a, 3b and 3c were combined into a single Outer zone 3 for London Buses. The off-peak One Day Travelcard, initially launched on 22 April 1984, also used the zones.

British Rail stations in London were brought into the fare zones when the weekly, monthly and annual Capitalcard was introduced on 6 January 1985. The fare zones were also used for the off-peak One Day Capitalcard launched in June 1986. When the Capitalcard and Travelcard tickets were folded into a single Travelcard brand on 8 January 1989, the outer zones were renamed. 3a became zone 3, 3b became zone 4 and 3c became zone 5. Whereas 3a, 3b and 3c had been grouped as one zone for bus fares, only zones 4 and 5 were grouped after the change. Zone 3 was coloured yellow on maps to indicate this. Part of zone 5 was split off into a new zone 6 from 6 January 1991. The LT Card, valid only on London Transport services at all times of day and introduced on 12 May 1991, also used the fare zones.

== Principal fare zones ==
All of Greater London is within the six principal fare zones numbered 1 to 6. Inner zone 1 forms a roughly circular area and covers central London. Each of five outer zones forms a concentric ring around it. Zones 4, 5 and 6 additionally extend into parts of Essex, Hertfordshire and Surrey. List of boroughs in each zone:

Zone	Inner London	Outer London	Outside London
1	Central London: City of London, Camden, Hackney, Islington, Kensington & Chelsea, Lambeth, Southwark, Tower Hamlets, Wandsworth and Westminster		
2	Camden, Hackney, Hammersmith & Fulham, Islington, Kensington & Chelsea, Lambeth, Lewisham, Newham, Southwark, Tower Hamlets, Wandsworth and Westminster	Brent, Ealing, Greenwich, Hounslow	
3	Camden, Hackney, Haringey, Islington, Lambeth, Lewisham, Newham, Southwark, Wandsworth	Barnet, Brent, Bromley, Croydon, Ealing, Greenwich, Hounslow, Merton, Richmond upon Thames, Waltham Forest	
4	Lewisham, Haringey, Newham	Barking and Dagenham, Barnet, Bexley, Brent, Bromley, Croydon, Ealing, Enfield, Greenwich, Hounslow, Kingston upon Thames, Merton, Redbridge, Richmond upon Thames, Sutton, Waltham Forest	Epping Forest (Essex)
5		Barking and Dagenham, Barnet, Bexley, Bromley, Croydon, Ealing, Enfield, Harrow, Hillingdon, Hounslow, Kingston upon Thames, Richmond upon Thames, Sutton, Waltham Forest	Epping Forest (Essex), Epsom and Ewell (Surrey)
6		Bexley, Bromley, Croydon, Enfield, Harrow, Havering, Hillingdon, Hounslow, Kingston upon Thames, Richmond upon Thames	Elmbridge (Surrey), Epping Forest (Essex), Epsom and Ewell (Surrey), Hertsmere (Hertfordshire), Reigate and Banstead (Surrey), Tandridge (Surrey), Three Rivers (Hertfordshire)

== Ancillary zones ==
For some services outside Greater London where fares are set by Transport for London, there are three additional zones 7, 8 and 9. They extend into Buckinghamshire, Essex and Hertfordshire to include most stations served by TfL services beyond zone 6. Some National Rail stations that are outside Greater London are also in these zones. Unlike zones 2–6, they do not form complete rings around London.

== Outside fare zones ==
As of January 2013, there were eight National Rail stations outside the nine numbered fare zones, where Oyster card pay as you go is permitted and fares are set by the train operating companies. They are located in Essex and Hertfordshire, and are organised into additional areas B, C, G and W. On maps, these stations are shown as being outside fare zones 1–9, but within the 'special fares' Oyster pay as you go area.

In January 2016, the Oyster and contactless system was extended to Gatwick Airport in Crawley, West Sussex, and the stations down that line (Horley, Salfords, Earlswood, Redhill and Merstham).

All stations accepting Oyster card but outside the publicised fare zones (except Stratford International) are put into unadvertised zones, which are numbered 9 to 14, for the purpose of calculating caps. In addition, there are stations which are further out accepting contactless payment cards but not Oyster cards. These stations do not have zonal fares and caps, with caps applied on the basis of individual stations, and categorised as zone 16 in the fare data.
