= Caterham railway station =

National Rail station in Surrey, England

Caterham
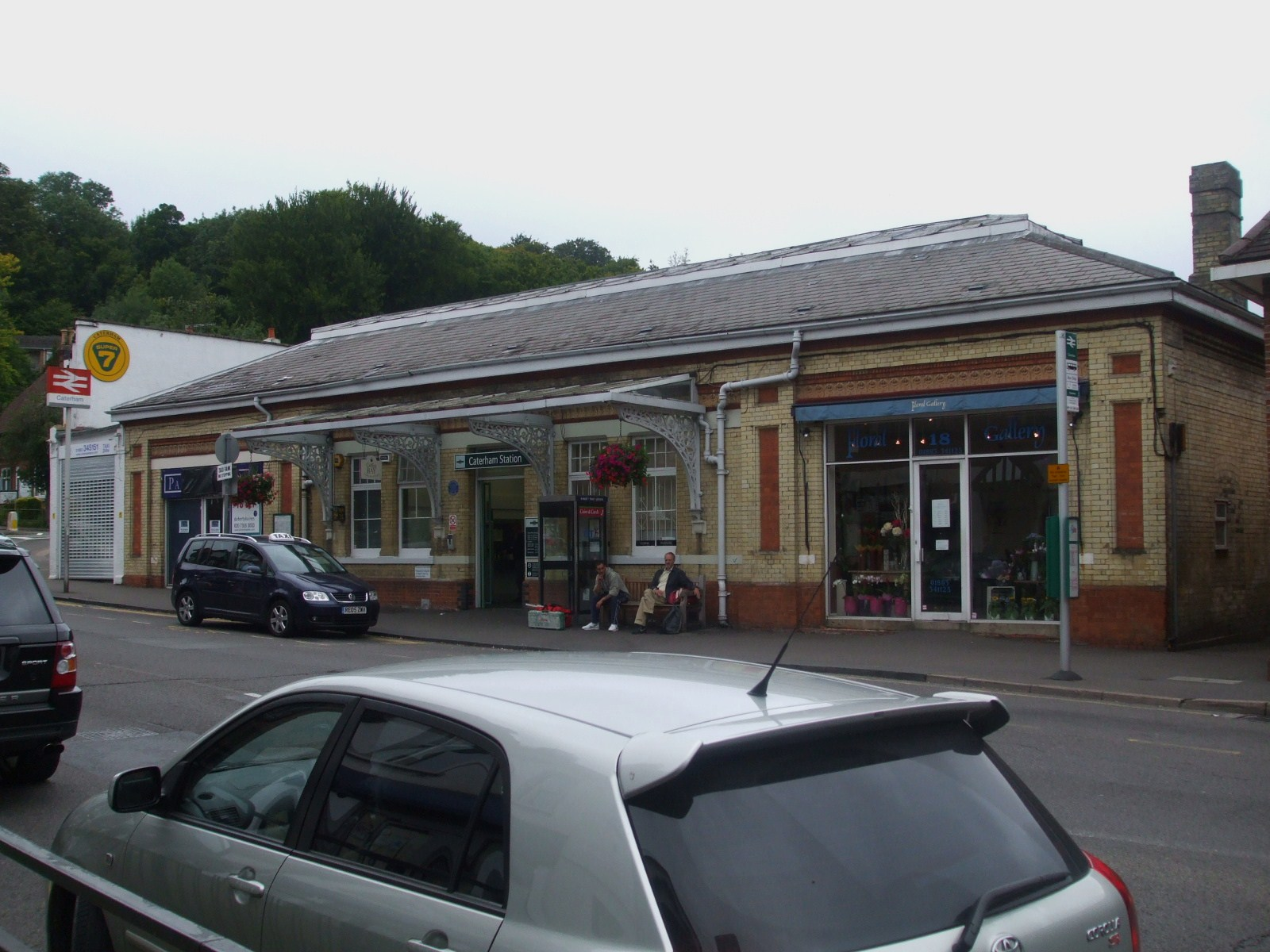
- Interactive map of Caterham

General information
- Location: Caterham
- Local authority: District of Tandridge
- Managed by: Southern
- Station code: CAT
- DfT category: D
- Number of platforms: 2
- Accessible: Yes
- Fare zone: 6

National Rail annual entry and exit
- 2020–21: ▼0.209 million
- 2021–22: ▲0.480 million
- 2022–23: ▲0.572 million
- 2023–24: ▼0.568 million
- 2024–25: ▲0.585 million

Key dates
- 5 August 1856: First station opened
- 1 January 1900: Second station opened

Other information
- External links: Departures; Facilities
- Coordinates: 51.28250°N 0.07861°W

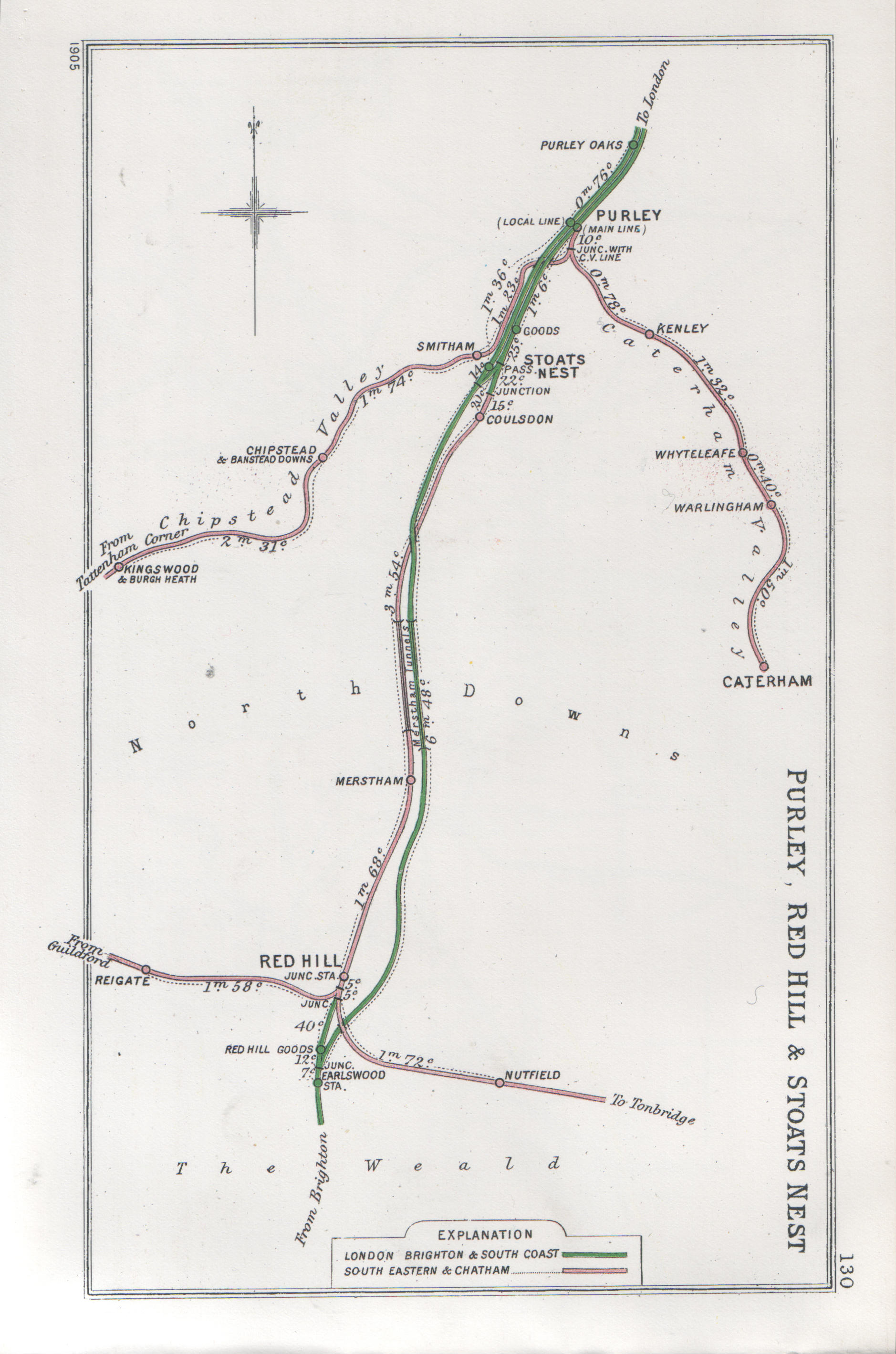
A 1905 Railway Clearing House map of lines around Caterham railway station.

Caterham railway station serves the town of Caterham in the Tandridge district of Surrey.

Caterham train drivers depot was opened on Sunday 17 June 1928 as a motorman's depot (the "motor" term being used for electric trains) after electrification on the line was complete in March of that year, and is still a working depot today. The guards depot at Caterham was closed in the late 1980s.

== Location ==
The station is located at the southern terminus of the Caterham Line, which branches from the Brighton Main Line at Purley. It is 19 miles 70 chains (32.0 km) from Charing Cross, which took the branch over in 1859, three years after its completion.

== History ==
The town's first station was originally opened on 5 August 1856 by the Caterham Railway. It was closed on 1 January 1900 by the South Eastern and Chatham Railway, which opened a new station of the same name on an adjacent site that day. The site of the original station is now occupied by a supermarket and the present station's car park. The line was electrified (on the 660 V DC system) by the Southern Railway in March 1928.

On 26 June 1945, two motormen were killed, and some passengers injured, when two trains collided. The inquiry found that an inattentive motorman had passed a signal at danger.

Today the station and all trains serving it are operated by the Southern train operating company. It has a single island platform with a one-storey ticket office dating from just before the turn of the 20th century. There is a carriage siding on the western (Up) side of the station.

== Connections ==
London Buses routes 407, 434 and Metrobus routes 400, 409 and 411 serve the station.

== Services ==
All services at Caterham are operated by Southern using Class 377 EMUs.

The typical off-peak service in trains per hour is 2 semi-fast tph to London Bridge.

Up until September 2022 there were additional off-peak services to London Bridge via Norbury and Tulse Hill.

Preceding station	National Rail	Following station
Whyteleafe South	Southern Caterham Line	Terminus
