= Pratt's Bottom =

Village in Greater London, England

Coordinates: 51.3397°N 0.1128°E

- Village
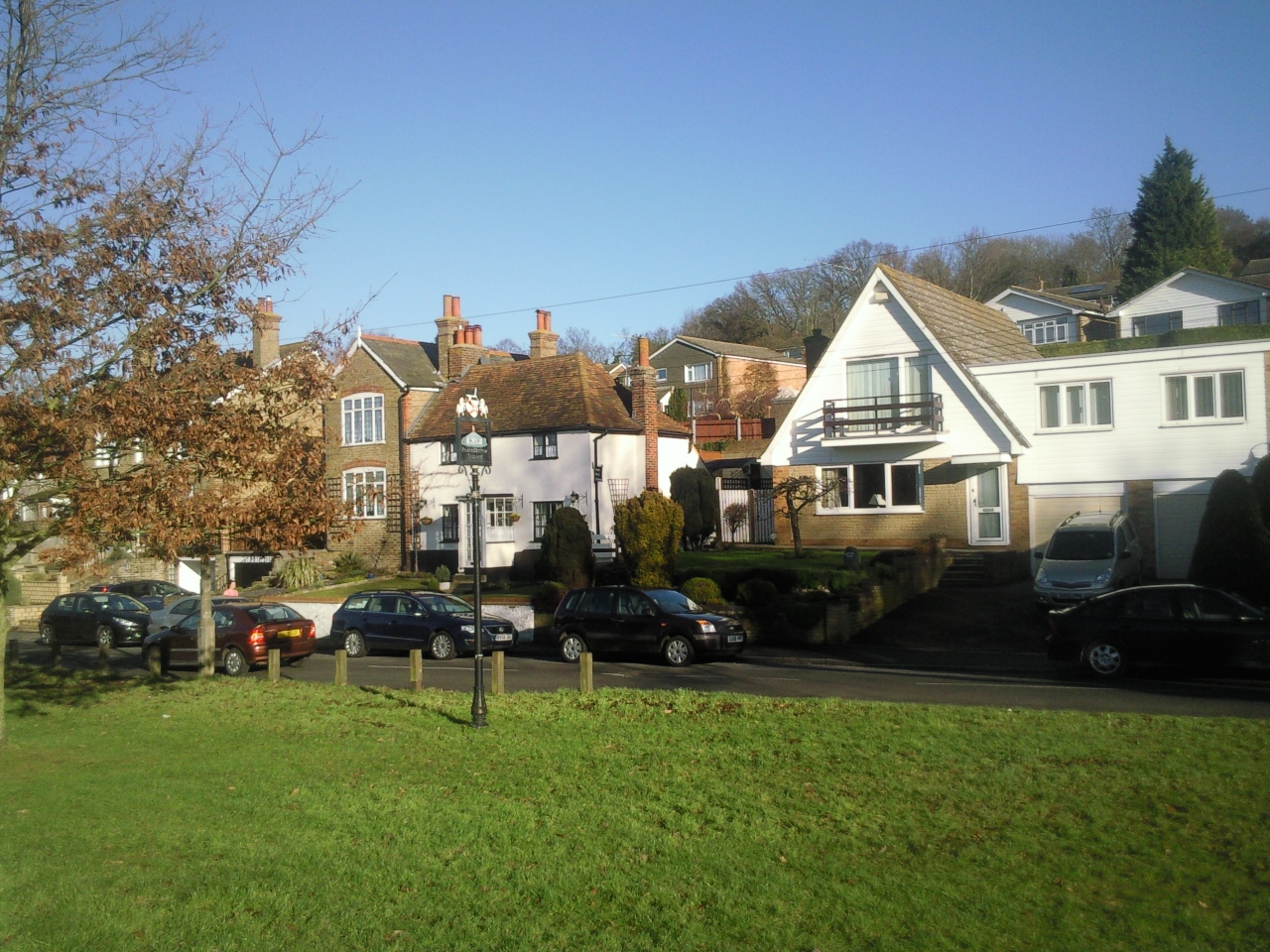

- Location within Greater London
- OS grid reference: TQ471622
- London borough: Bromley
- Ceremonial county: Greater London
- Region: London
- Country: England
- Sovereign state: United Kingdom
- Post town: ORPINGTON
- Postcode district: BR6
- Dialling code: 01689
- Police: Metropolitan
- Fire: London
- Ambulance: London
- UK Parliament: Orpington
- London Assembly: Bexley and Bromley

Pratt's Bottom is a village in Greater London, England, within the London Borough of Bromley and, prior to 1965, within the historic county of Kent. It is south of its parent parish of Orpington, lies about 100 metres above sea level and beyond London's urban sprawl.

It has frequently been noted on lists of unusual place names.

It is a small village, consisting of a main road (Rushmore Hill) on which is situated a school, a village shop (the post office was closed as part of the widespread branch closures of June 2008) and the Bulls Head pub, two small churches and a few side roads. There is a village hall behind the green.

== History ==
A "bottom" in this context means a valley or hollow, and the Pratts were a noble family once seated in the area. Pratt's Bottom formed part of the ancient, and later civil, parish of Chelsfield in Kent and was part of the Bromley Rural District from 1896. The parish was abolished in 1934 and the village became part of Orpington Urban District. In 1965 it was transferred to Greater London, to form part of the London Borough of Bromley.

A tollgate stood in the village for many years. The turnpike cottage was demolished in the 1930s but is still seen as emblematic of the village, so much so that it is the basis of the recent village sign placed on the green. Sue Short has written a book about the history of the village titled Pratts Bottom: A Journey Through Life.

== Transport ==
Pratts Bottom, being in London, is under Transport for London remit and is served by London Buses bus services. Routes R5 and R10 serve the village, connecting it to Halstead, Knockholt, Cudham, Green Street Green and Orpington. Go-Coach also operate weekday services on route 3 providing connections to Locksbottom, Dunton Green and Sevenoaks. Pratt's Bottom is also within the operating area of Go-Coach's demand responsive go2 Sevenoaks service that allows passengers to order a shared bus via an app or phone number to destinations in the region including Westerham, Otford and Ightham.

The nearest rail link to Pratts Bottom is at Knockholt railway station in London Borough of Bromley.

== Nearby areas ==
Pratts Bottom borders Chelsfield to the north and north east, Badgers Mount to the east, Halstead to the south east, Knockholt to the south and south west, Hazelwood to the west and Green Street Green to the north west. Number 30 Turnpike Road is divided into Orpington to the West and Halstead to the East.

== See also ==
- Chelsfield (ward)
- Rude Britain
