= Hockenden =

Coordinates: 51.402131°N 0.149956°E

- Hamlet
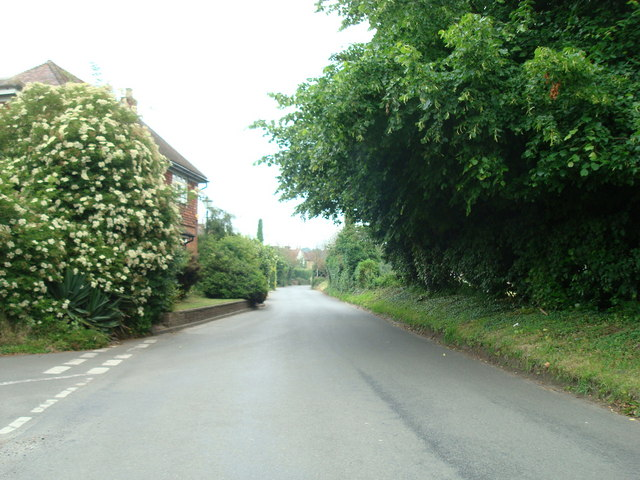
- Hockenden Lane, Hockenden

- Location within Greater London
- London borough: Bromley
- Ceremonial county: Greater London
- Region: London
- Country: England
- Sovereign state: United Kingdom
- Post town: SWANLEY
- Postcode district: BR8
- Police: Metropolitan
- Fire: London
- Ambulance: London
- London Assembly: Bexley and Bromley

Hockenden is a hamlet in Greater London, within the London Borough of Bromley. It is located within Swanley, adjacent to the Greater London border with Kent in the Metropolitan green belt.

It is part of the Orpington Borough Constituency.

== Transport ==
There are no bus routes that serve Hockenden. The closest bus stop is at Birchwood Corner, which is served by London Buses route 233 to Swanley or to Eltham via Sidcup.

The closest rail station is Swanley, located 1.5 miles away.
