= Knockholt railway station =

National Rail station in London, England

Knockholt
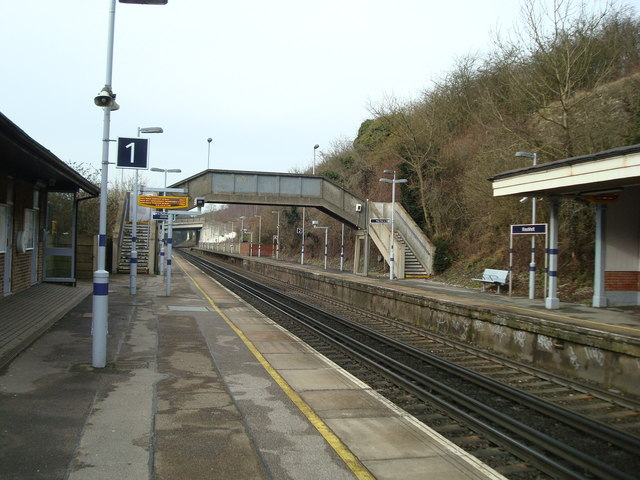
- Interactive map of Knockholt

General information
- Location: Badgers Mount
- Local authority: London Borough of Bromley
- Managed by: Southeastern
- Station code: KCK
- DfT category: E
- Number of platforms: 2
- Fare zone: 6

National Rail annual entry and exit
- 2020–21: ▼41,220
- 2021–22: ▲0.111 million
- 2022–23: ▲0.137 million
- 2023–24: ▲0.170 million
- 2024–25: ▲0.189 million

Railway companies
- Original company: South Eastern Railway
- Pre-grouping: South Eastern and Chatham Railway
- Post-grouping: Southern Railway

Key dates
- 1 May 1876: Opened as Halstead for Knockholt
- 1 October 1900: renamed Knockholt

Other information
- External links: Departures; Facilities
- Coordinates: 51.3459°N 0.1307°E

Knockholt railway station is on the South Eastern Main Line, located in the London Borough of Bromley, Greater London. It is 16 miles 44 chains (26.6 km) down the line from London Charing Cross and is situated between Chelsfield and Dunton Green stations. It is in London fare zone 6 and is located next to the Greater London boundary within the Kent district of Sevenoaks. The boundary is the farm bridge at the southern end of the platforms.

There is a tunnel to the south of the station, not far from the station itself. The station consists of a ticket office, a bike rack, a small shelter on platform 1 and a slightly larger shelter on platform 2. There is a footbridge connecting the two platforms. The station is situated between Chelsfield and Dunton Green.

The station saw 477 entries/exits daily in 2024.

== Location ==
The station is 4.8 km (3.0 mi) north-northeast (NNE) of the village of Knockholt but closer to several other settlements. The station serves several small communities in the Sevenoaks district of Kent in addition to Knockholt; Badgers Mount 1.3 km (0.81 mi) to the southeast, Well Hill 1.3 km (0.81 mi) northeast, and Halstead 2.2 km (1.4 mi) south. Within the Bromley borough Pratt's Bottom is only 2 km (1.2 mi) west-southwest; and also Chelsfield (although having its own railway station, is in parts closer to Knockholt station) at about 2.7 km (1.7 mi) to the north and west. To avoid confusion with Halstead in Essex it was named after the next closest village. The station is operated by southeastern and only metro stopping services call here. The platforms, like all stations on the London to Sevenoaks route, has space for 12 coaches. Northbound trains with 8 (or less)coaches will have their rear carriages further up the platform past the bridge.

The station has only got step-free access to one platform (The nearest station with step free access is Chelsfield) and has no toilets. This station is for passengers requiring the villages of Badgers Mount, Well Hill, Knockholt or Halstead. The ticket office is usually only open from 6-9 am on weekdays.

== Services ==
All services at Knockholt are operated by Southeastern using Class 376, 465, 466 and 707 EMUs.

The typical off-peak service in trains per hour is:

- 2 tph to London Charing Cross via Grove Park and Lewisham
- 2 tph to Sevenoaks

Connections onto fast services to London, Tunbridge Wells ,Hastings and The Kent Coast can be made by changing at Orpington or Sevenoaks. From Sevenoaks you can change onto Thameslink services to Welwyn Garden City or London Blackfriars via Swanley and Southeastern services to Ramsgate via Ashford International or Hastings via Tunbridge Wells. From Orpington you can get Southeastern Services to London Victoria and Thameslink services to Kentish Town

Preceding station	National Rail	Following station
Chelsfield	Southeastern Grove Park Line	Dunton Green

== History ==
When the South Eastern Railway (SER) opened their "cut off" line through Orpington, Sevenoaks to Tonbridge in 1868, there was no station between Chelsfield and Dunton Green. A Knockholt Vestry meeting in March 1871 resolved to request the SER to build a station for Knockholt but this request was initially refused. Eventually, the SER agreed to provide a station if a £3,000 contribution was provided by "local parties," (equivalent to £300,000 in 2025). This was raised and "Halstead for Knockholt" (the station being much closer to Halstead than Knockholt) was opened in 1876.

Between 1887 and 1915 a twice daily bus service operated from Knockholt village to the station.

In 1899 the SER joined with its arch rival to form the South Eastern and Chatham Railway (SECR). Alfred Smithers, who had moved to Knockholt in 1881, became deputy chairman of the SECR. At the strong suggestion of Smithers, the station name was changed to "Knockholt" in 1900 to avoid the confusion which had arisen with Halstead Station in Essex (and coincidentally giving Smithers a local station named after his village).
