= Christopher Denny =

English cricketer

Personal information
- Full name: Christopher Mark Denny
- Born: 22 April 1964 (age 62); Farnborough, Kent, England
- Batting: Right-handed
- Bowling: Slow left-arm orthodox

Domestic team information
- Years: Team
- 1985: Oxford University

Career statistics
| Competition | First-class |
|---|---|
| Matches | 4 |
| Runs scored | 28 |
| Batting average | 5.60 |
| 100s/50s | –/– |
| Top score | 19 |
| Catches/stumpings | 3/– |
- Source: Cricinfo, 30 May 2020

Christopher Mark Denny (born 22 April 1964) is an English former first-class cricketer.

Denny was born in April 1964 at Farnborough, Kent. He later studied at Christ Church at the University of Oxford. While studying at Oxford, Denny made four appearances in first-class cricket for Oxford University against Glamorgan, Leicestershire, Hampshire and the touring Zimbabweans at Oxford in 1985. Denny scored a total of 28 runs in these matches, with a high score of 19.

After graduating from Oxford, Denny was employed in marketing. He was head of marketing for the London bid for the 2012 Summer Olympics. Having helped to secure the London bid, Denny worked for four years for British Swimming and the Amateur Swimming Association, before joining UK Athletics in April 2015. Following a career break, Denny became a magistrate in 2019.
