= Well Hill =

Hamlet in Kent, England

Coordinates: 51.3544°N 0.1480°E

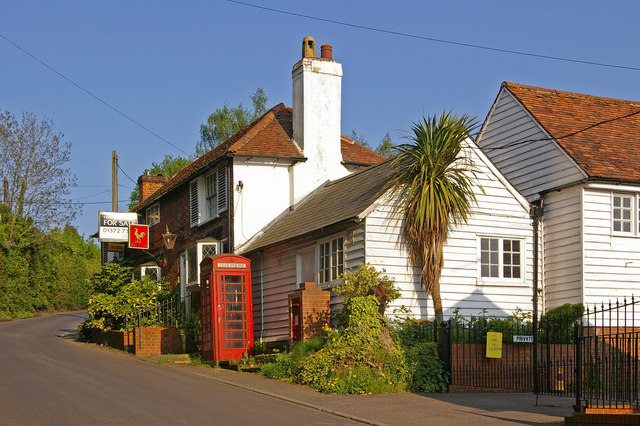
- The Rock and Fountain pub

- Location within Kent
- OS grid reference: TQ495639
  - London: 16 mi (26 km) NW
- Civil parish: Shoreham
- District: Sevenoaks
- Shire county: Kent
- Region: South East
- Country: England
- Sovereign state: United Kingdom
- Post town: ORPINGTON
- Postcode district: BR6
- Dialling code: 01959
- Police: Kent
- Fire: Kent
- Ambulance: South East Coast
- UK Parliament: Sevenoaks

Well Hill is a small rural hamlet within the civil parish of Shoreham in the Sevenoaks District of Kent, England. It borders east of Orpington & 3.5 miles south of Swanley, adjacent to the Kent border with Greater London, within the constituency of Sevenoaks .

== Well Hill ==
The hamlet consists of several small cross roads on minor country roads which are mostly without street lighting or pavement and some are single track for a length and lined with trees. There are many detached houses with fairly large gardens, scattered with trees, a public house and a small church; further out there are several farms with many fields, and larger, denser woodland.

Well Hill is sometimes referred to as a village but usually a hamlet; although not an absolute definition, it does not have its own parish at present. Well Hill along with Crockenhill to the north make the electoral ward Crockenhill and Well Hill Ward; however the settlement is within the Shoreham Parish not Crockenhill Parish.

== Transport ==
=== Rail ===
The nearest National Rail station is Knockholt, located 1.4 miles away.

=== Buses ===
Whilst no buses serve Well Hill, London Buses route R7 serves Chelsfield Village which is located 0.5 miles away. This connects it with areas including Chislehurst & Orpington.
