= Chelsfield railway station =

National Rail station in London, England

Chelsfield
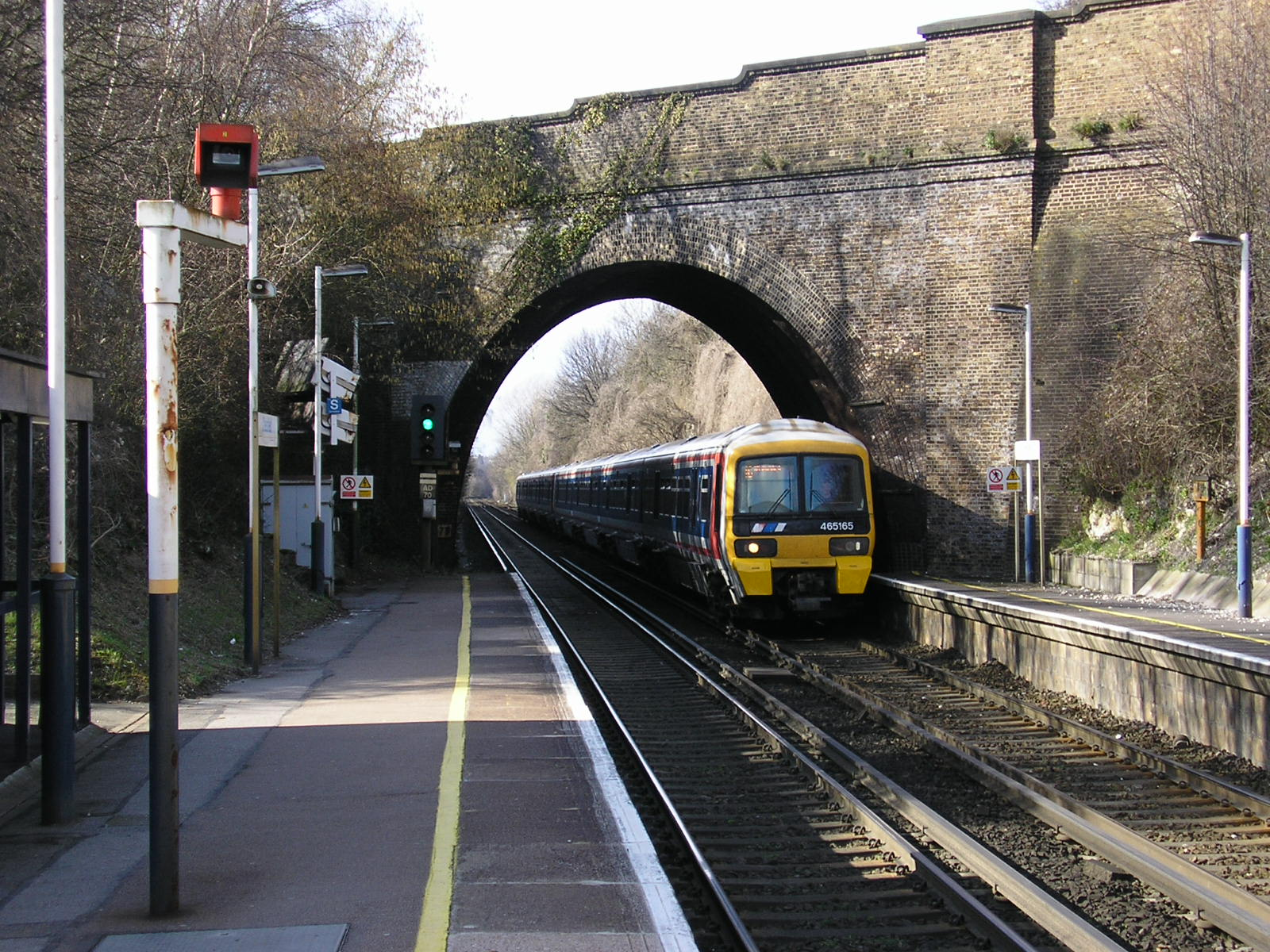
- Interactive map of Chelsfield

General information
- Location: Chelsfield
- Local authority: London Borough of Bromley
- Managed by: Southeastern
- Station code: CLD
- DfT category: D
- Number of platforms: 2
- Accessible: Yes
- Fare zone: 6

National Rail annual entry and exit
- 2020–21: ▼0.115 million
- 2021–22: ▲0.346 million
- 2022–23: ▲0.478 million
- 2023–24: ▲0.549 million
- 2024–25: ▲0.593 million

Key dates
- 2 March 1868: Opened

Other information
- External links: Departures; Facilities
- Coordinates: 51.3565°N 0.1076°E

Chelsfield railway station is on the South Eastern Main Line, serving the Chelsfield and Green Street Green areas south of Orpington, in the London Borough of Bromley, south-east London. It is 15 miles 25 chains (24.6 km) down the line from London Charing Cross and is situated between Orpington and Knockholt stations. It is in London fare zone 6.

The line on which it is located, and the station itself, was opened on 2 March 1868 by the South Eastern Railway to shorten its route from London to Dover. The building of the route, which crosses the North Downs, was a difficult undertaking, with steep gradients. At Chelsfield the line is rising steadily on a 1 in 120 gradient through the Chelsfield Tunnel beyond the station. It is said that this was an inspiration to E. Nesbit when writing The Railway Children, as well as Knockholt and the track running between the stations.

The modern station building dates from the 1970s when its predecessor was damaged by fire. It is of a similar design to Elmers End station.

== Services ==
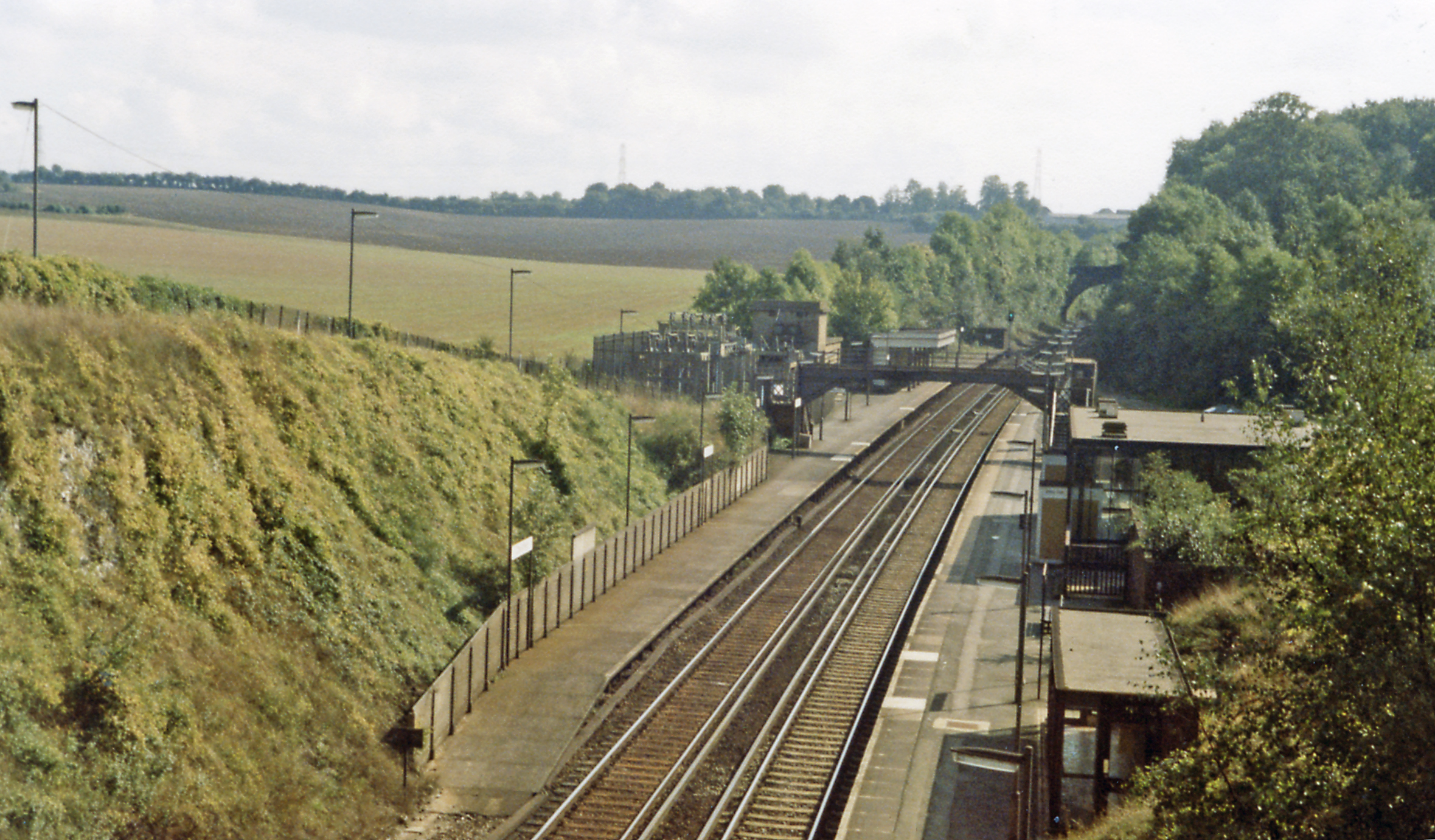
Chelsfield station (1983)

All services at Chelsfield are operated by Southeastern using Class 376, 465, 466, 375, 377 and 707 EMUs.

The typical off-peak service in trains per hour is:

- 2 tph to London Charing Cross via Grove Park and Lewisham
- 2 tph to Sevenoaks

During the peak hours, the station is served by additional services to and from London Cannon Street, Tunbridge Wells and Hastings.

Preceding station	National Rail	Following station
Orpington	Southeastern Grove Park Line	Knockholt
London Bridge	Southeastern: Hastings Line; Peak Hours Only	Sevenoaks or High Brooms

== Connections ==
London Buses route R1 serves the station.
