= BR postcode area =

Postcode area within the United Kingdom

Bromley
- Postcode area
- Coordinates: 51.394°N 0.047°E
- Country: United Kingdom
- Postcode area: BR
- Postcode area name: Bromley
- Post towns: 7
- Postcode districts: 8
- Postcode sectors: 39
- Postcodes (live): 6,803
- Postcodes (total): 10,558
- Statistics as at May 2020

The BR postcode area, also known as the Bromley postcode area, is a group of eight postcode districts in England, within seven post towns. These cover part of south-eastern Greater London, as well as a small part of north-west Kent.

The area covers much of the London Borough of Bromley, as well as small parts of the London Borough of Lewisham, the London Borough of Bexley, the Royal Borough of Greenwich and the London Borough of Croydon. Most of BR8 and a small part of BR6 cover the northwestern part of the Sevenoaks District of Kent, while BR8 also covers the hamlet of Clement Street in the borough of Dartford.

Mail for the area was sorted in Bromley until 1988 when the site was converted to a delivery office only.

== Coverage ==
The approximate coverage of the postcode districts:

| Postcode district | Post town | Coverage | Local authority area(s) |
|---|---|---|---|
| BR1 | BROMLEY | Bromley, Bickley, Downham, Sundridge, Plaistow | Bromley, Lewisham |
| BR2 | BROMLEY | Hayes, Shortlands, Bickley, Bromley Common | Bromley |
| BR2 | KESTON | Keston, Keston Mark, Leaves Green | Bromley |
| BR3 | BECKENHAM | Beckenham, Elmers End, Shortlands, Eden Park, Park Langley, Clock House | Bromley, Lewisham, Croydon |
| BR4 | WEST WICKHAM | West Wickham | Bromley |
| BR5 | ORPINGTON | Petts Wood, St Mary Cray, St Paul's Cray, Ruxley | Bromley, Bexley |
| BR6 | ORPINGTON | Orpington, Locksbottom, Farnborough, Crofton, Green Street Green, Chelsfield, Downe, Pratt's Bottom, Well Hill | Bromley, Sevenoaks |
| BR7 | CHISLEHURST | Chislehurst, Elmstead | Bromley, Greenwich |
| BR8 | SWANLEY | Swanley, Hextable, Crockenhill, Swanley Village, Hockenden | Sevenoaks, Bromley, Dartford |

== Map ==
BR postcode area map, showing postcode districts in red and post towns in grey text, with links to nearby CR, DA, SE and TN postcode areas.

== See also ==
- List of postcode areas in the United Kingdom
- Postcode Address File
