= Crockenhill =

Village in Kent, England

Coordinates: 51.383°N 0.162°E

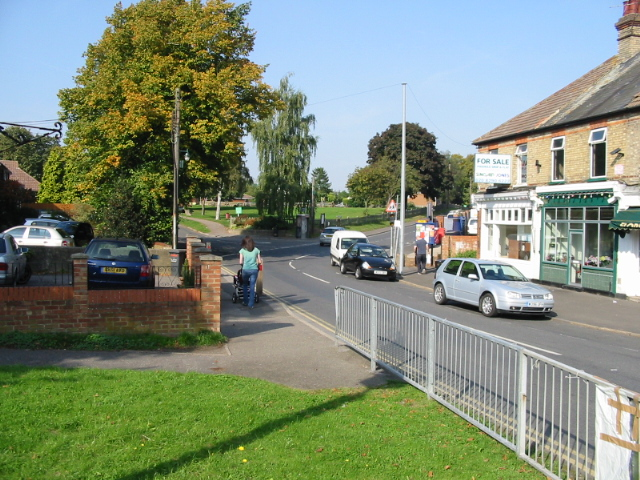
- Crockenhill

- Location within Kent
- Population: 1,654 (2011 Census)
- OS grid reference: TQ504671
- District: Sevenoaks
- Shire county: Kent
- Region: South East
- Country: England
- Sovereign state: United Kingdom
- Post town: SWANLEY
- Postcode district: BR8
- Dialling code: 01322
- Police: Kent
- Fire: Kent
- Ambulance: South East Coast
- UK Parliament: Sevenoaks

Crockenhill is a village in the Sevenoaks District of West Kent, England.

The hamlet of Skeet Hill falls within the Crockenhill boundary and Skeet Hill Lane in Orpington is located in the South East region of England. The postcode is within the Crockenhill and Well Hill ward/electoral division, which is in the constituency of Orpington. Skeet Hill Lane, Orpington, BR6 7QA.

== Etymology ==
Crockenhill is from Old English hyll "hill" . "Crocken" comes from the Old English 'crundel' meaning a 'chalk-pit, quarry' with 'hyll' as a 'hill'; therefore a 'quarry on the hill'.(kentpast.co.uk) There is also a village named Crockham Hill near Westerham.

== Buildings ==
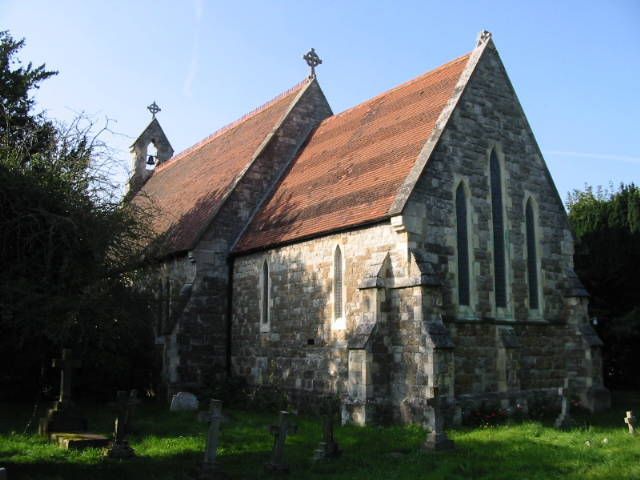
All Souls Church, Crockenhill

The main church in the village is the grade-II listed All Souls Church, built in 1851 by the architect Edwin Nash.

Skeet Hill Farm. Skeet Hill House. On the corner with Dalton’s Road. The house was built as a Dower House for Lullingstone Castle, and is said to be 400 years old Bought by Brady Boys Club in Whitechapel in 1943 and used by generations of east end Jewish children.

== Sport and leisure ==
Crockenhill has one Non-League football club: Crockenhill F.C. play in the Kent County Football League in the Division 2 West, sitting at level 13 of the English football league system.

Sadeh Farm Founded by Talia Chain, Sadeh is the UK’s Jewish community farm. Inspired by her fellowship experience at Adamah, a Jewish farm – based program in upstate New York, Talia saw the need for a British equivalent. Under her leadership it has evolved into an inclusive environmental community contextualised within the principles of Jewish ethics and culture. Skeet Hill Farm is based in Orpington and falls into the Crockenhill boundary.

== Transport ==
=== Rail ===
The nearest National Rail station is Swanley, located 1 mile away.

=== Buses ===
Crockenhill is served by Kent Country route 477 to Dartford via Swanley & to Orpington.

== Nearby areas ==
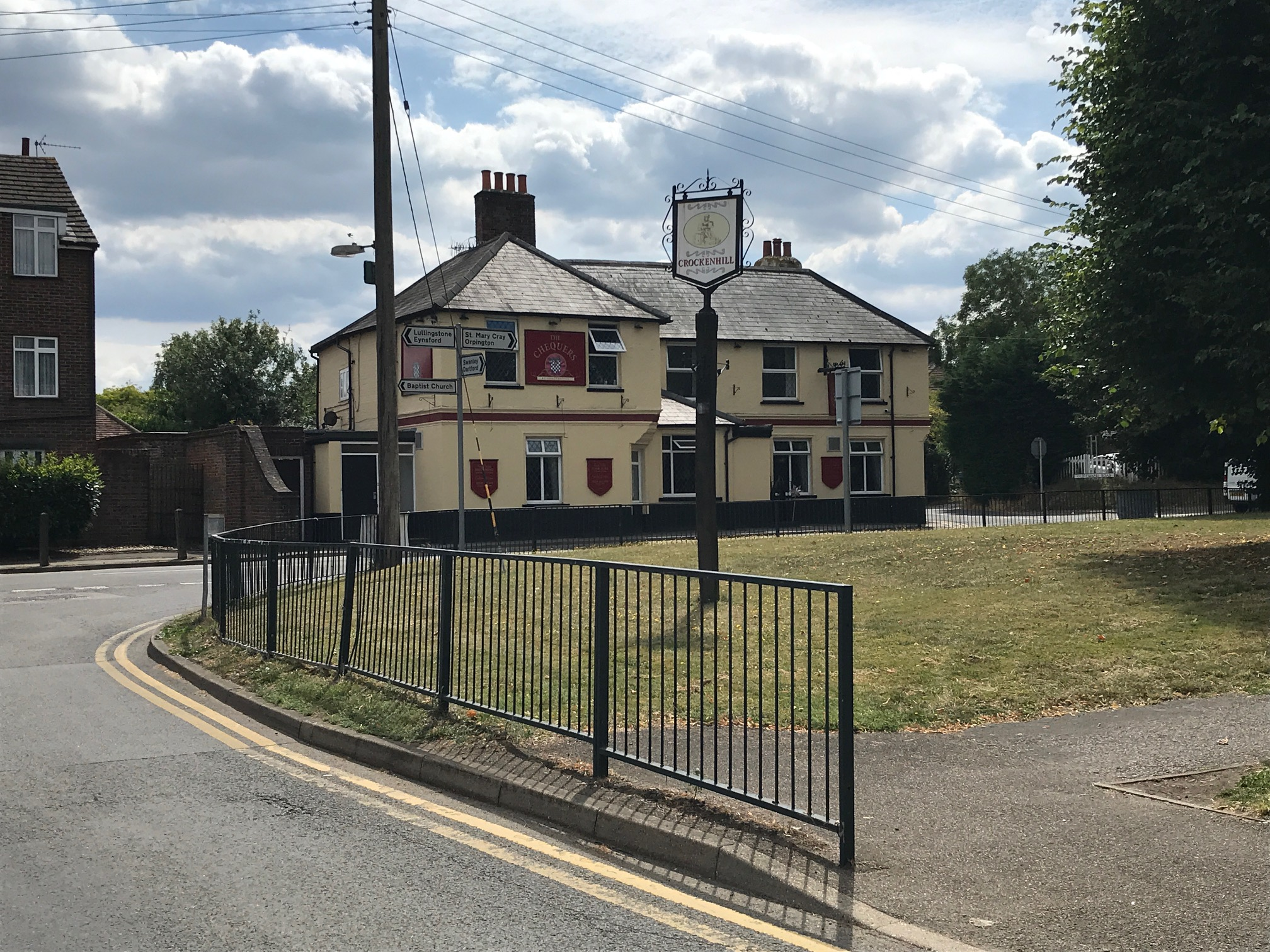
The Chequers pub in Crockenhill

Crockenhill borders Swanley to the north and north east, Eynsford to the east and south east, Well Hill to the south, Orpington to the south west and St Mary Cray, Derry Downs and Kevington to the west and north west.The Skeet Hill area of Orpington is in both Orpington & Crockenhill.

== See also ==
- List of places of worship in Sevenoaks (district)
