= Green Street Green =

Coordinates: 51.350933°N 0.088706°E

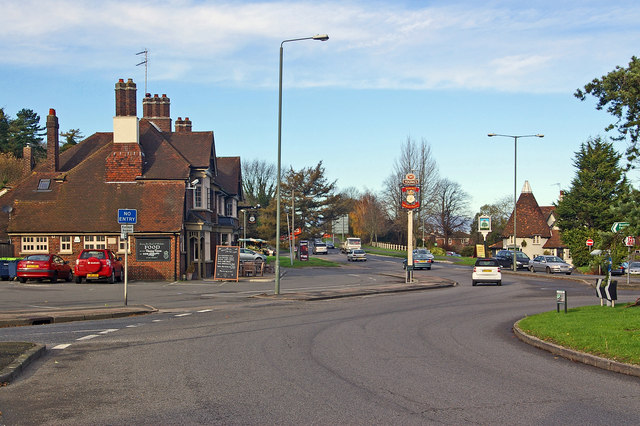

- Location within Greater London
- London borough: Bromley
- Ceremonial county: Greater London
- Region: London
- Country: England
- Sovereign state: United Kingdom
- Post town: ORPINGTON
- Postcode district: BR6
- Dialling code: 01689
- Police: Metropolitan
- Fire: London
- Ambulance: London
- UK Parliament: Orpington
- London Assembly: Bexley and Bromley

Green Street Green is an area in south-east London, located in the London Borough of Bromley and, prior to 1965, in the historic county of Kent. It is located south of Orpington, west of Chelsfield, north-west of Pratt's Bottom, north of Hazelwood, and south east of Farnborough.

== Etymology ==
The name originates from La Grenestrete c.1290, meaning the green or grassy hamlet. It is recorded as Greenstreet Green in 1819, the addition of the suffix Green, referring to a village green. The village did not historically form a parish of its own, instead forming part of the parishes of Farnborough and Chelsfield.

== History ==
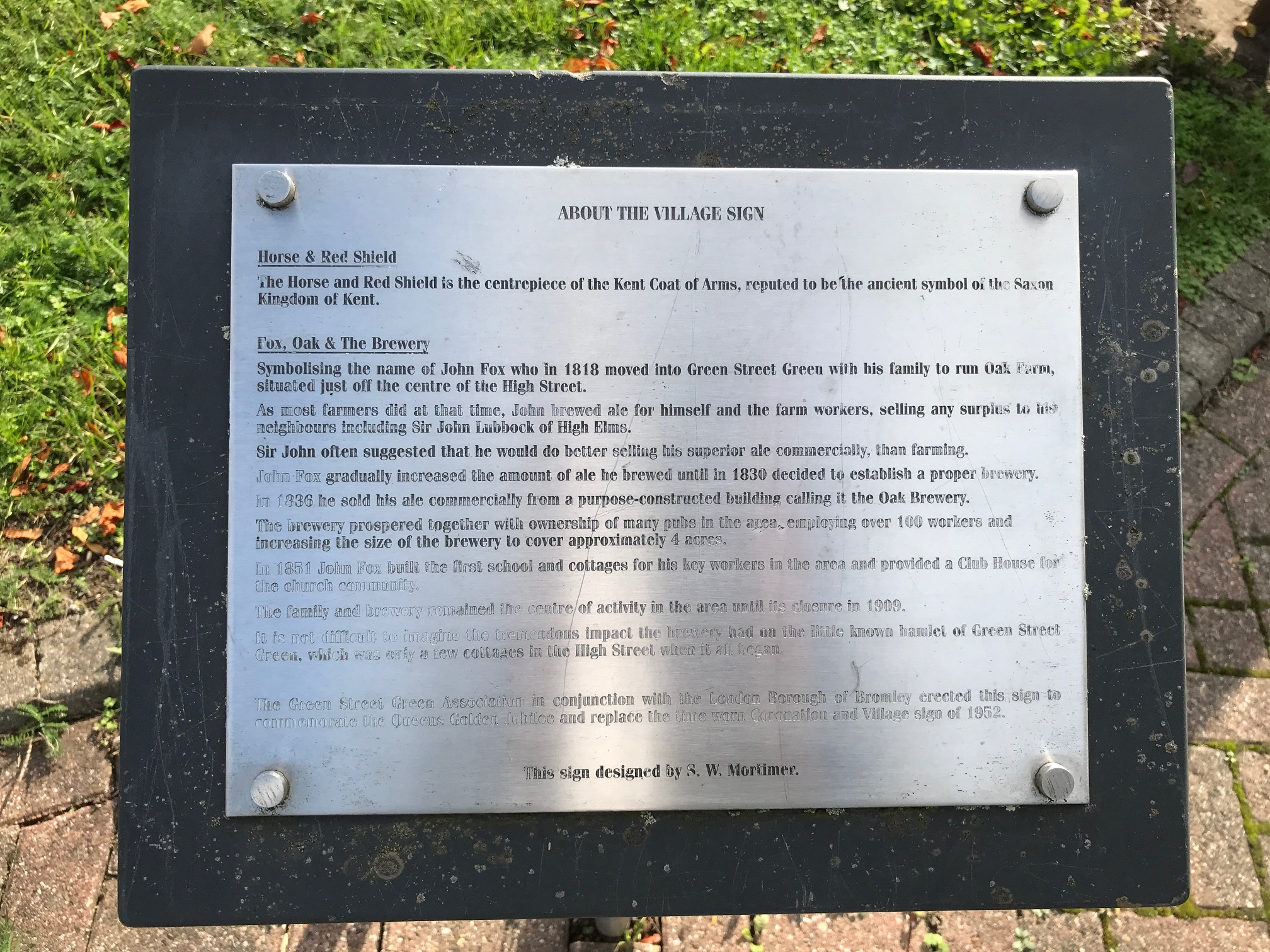
Historical information plaque by the village sign

Green Street Green was historically a hamlet, forming part of the coaching routes from London to Sussex. Development only really started with the opening of Oak Brewery by Fox & Sons in 1836, the growth of which led to a modest expansion of the area. Village life centred round the brewery until 1909 when it closed down, causing much unemployment. The area managed to recover, with a row of shops being built along the High Street in 1912. From the 1920s till the 1960s Green Street Green was such a popular meeting point for cyclists that several tea rooms opened in the village, attracting trade from the hordes of weekend cyclists who rode into the Kent countryside from London's suburbs. The former Mrs Valentine Moon's teashop is still a landmark on the east side of Sevenoaks Road, standing opposite The Green.

The first modern housing development was at Chelsfield Park in the 1920s. There were plans to extensively remodel the area as a 'model village' in the 1940s; however, due to post-war financial constraints, this never happened. In 1947, the Town and Country Planning Act set the London Green Belt boundary at the edge of Green Street Green by the A20 and A21 roads. Intensive building, council and private, took place in the 1950s between the village High Street and new Chelsfield. It was during this period that the attractive old people's dwellings were built at Brittenden Close, around three sides of a square lawn with rose gardens and terrace. The old brewery became the Telcon Plastics factory site before the Second World War, and made way for a new housing estate in 1992.

== Parks ==
Recreation grounds are at Cudham Lane North and at Glentrammon Road.

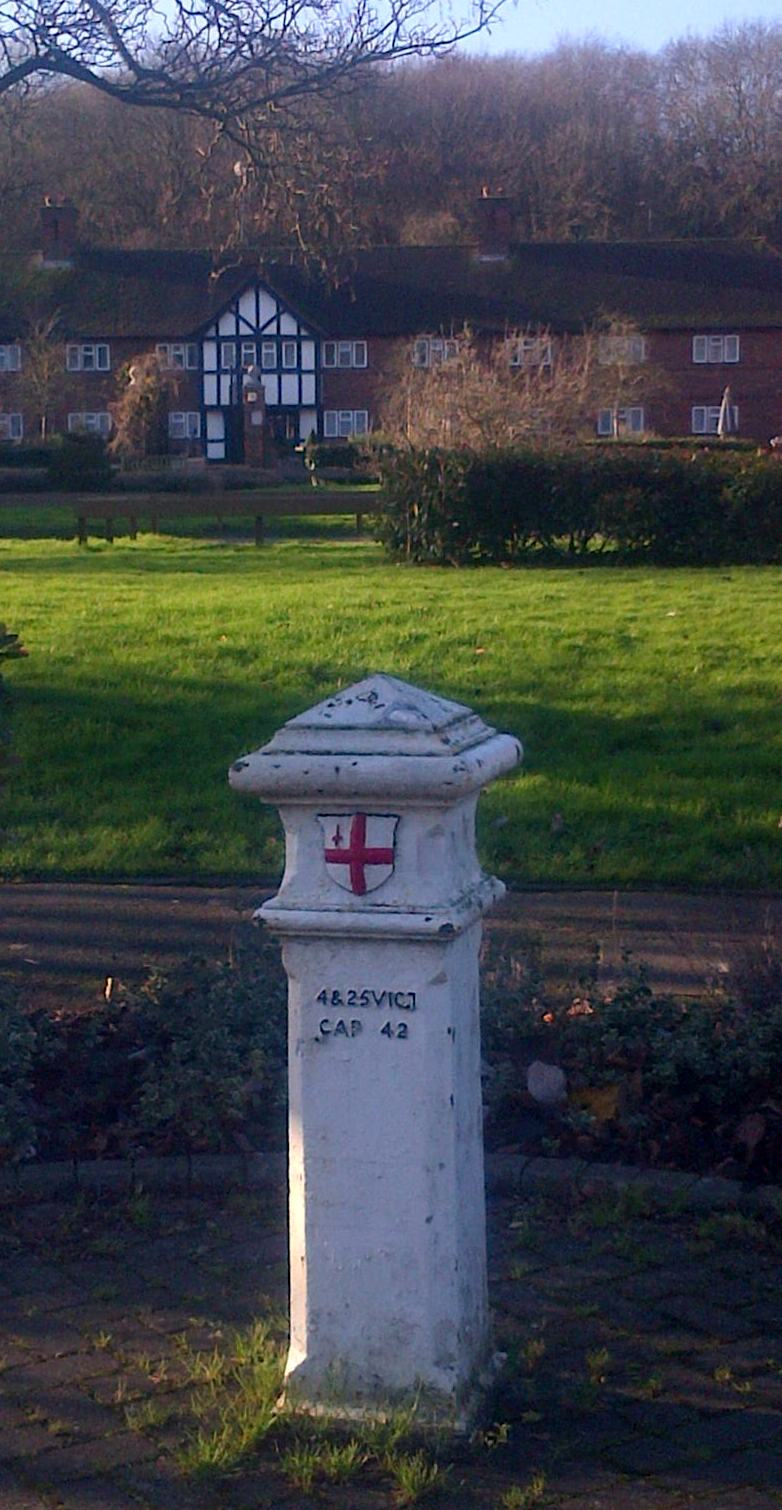
A Coal Post at Brittenden Close.

== Buildings ==
The Anglican parish church is St Mary's Green Street Green. It falls under the parish of Green Street Green and Pratt's Bottom in the diocese of Rochester. It was built in the early 20th century and in the first decade of the 21st century underwent some work on both inside and out to make it more accessible. The church plays an important role in the village, with many of the local schools' governors regularly attending it. The church's creative art group recently created a willow structure, placed on the top of the church, in the shape of a man reaching to the heavens, which has been a large attraction to the church. The vicar is Reverend Karl Carpani.

Green Street Green's Baptist church, know to members as "The Green" is a pivotal part of the local community. It holds youth events such as the popular worship event "Encounter" and does work within the community with the young people from St Mary's Church in an initiative called "Liberation".

== Pubs, restaurants and coffee houses ==
Green Street Green has a number of pubs, restaurants and coffee houses.

== Sports teams ==
=== Green Street Green Football Club ===
Green Street Green Football Club is an Amateur Football Club that plays its home games at Norman Park, Bromley. The club was formed in 2009 by Manager and player Darren Butland, after he decided to start a competitive 11 a side football team with friends. Green Street Green Football Club competes in the Metropolitan Sunday Football League Division Two. The team's original football kit colours were yellow and black (yellow shirts, black shorts and yellow socks) whilst its away kit was Red and White (white shirts, red shorts and red socks), however the team later changed their home colours to all green. On the 11 October 2020, Green Street Green defeated Bromley South FC 2-1 at Beckenham Town Football Club to win the Ted Holder Trophy for the 2019-20 season.

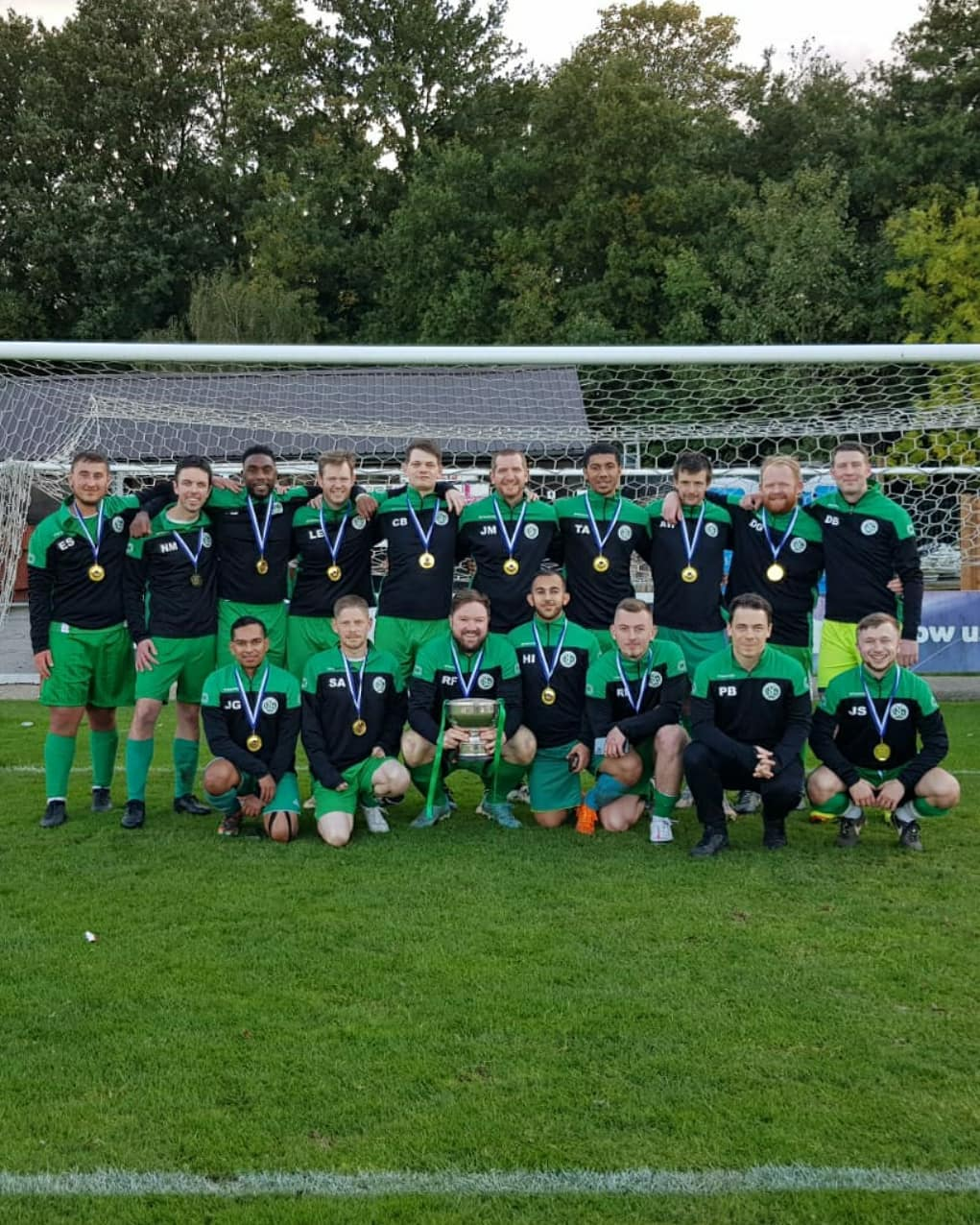

=== Green Street Green Rovers F.C. ===
GSGR F.C. is an amateur adult football team, formed in 2017, that plays in the Sevenoaks and District League on Saturdays.

== Transport ==
=== Rail ===
The nearest National Rail stations to Green Street Green are Chelsfield, located 1.3 miles away, and Orpington, located 1.6 miles away.

=== Buses ===
Green Street Green is served by London Buses routes 358, R1, R5, R8, R10 & R11 and Go Coach route 3. These connect it with areas including Beckenham, Bromley, Biggin Hill, Orpington, Penge, Sevenoaks & Sidcup.

== Notable residents ==
- Thomas Frank Durrant (1918–1942) - Victoria Cross recipient, born in Green Street Green.
- Eleanor Marx (1855–1898) - daughter of Karl Marx, lived in Green Street Green for a period.
- New Vaudeville Band - 1960s pop band, released a song in 1967 called "Green Street Green".

== Gallery ==
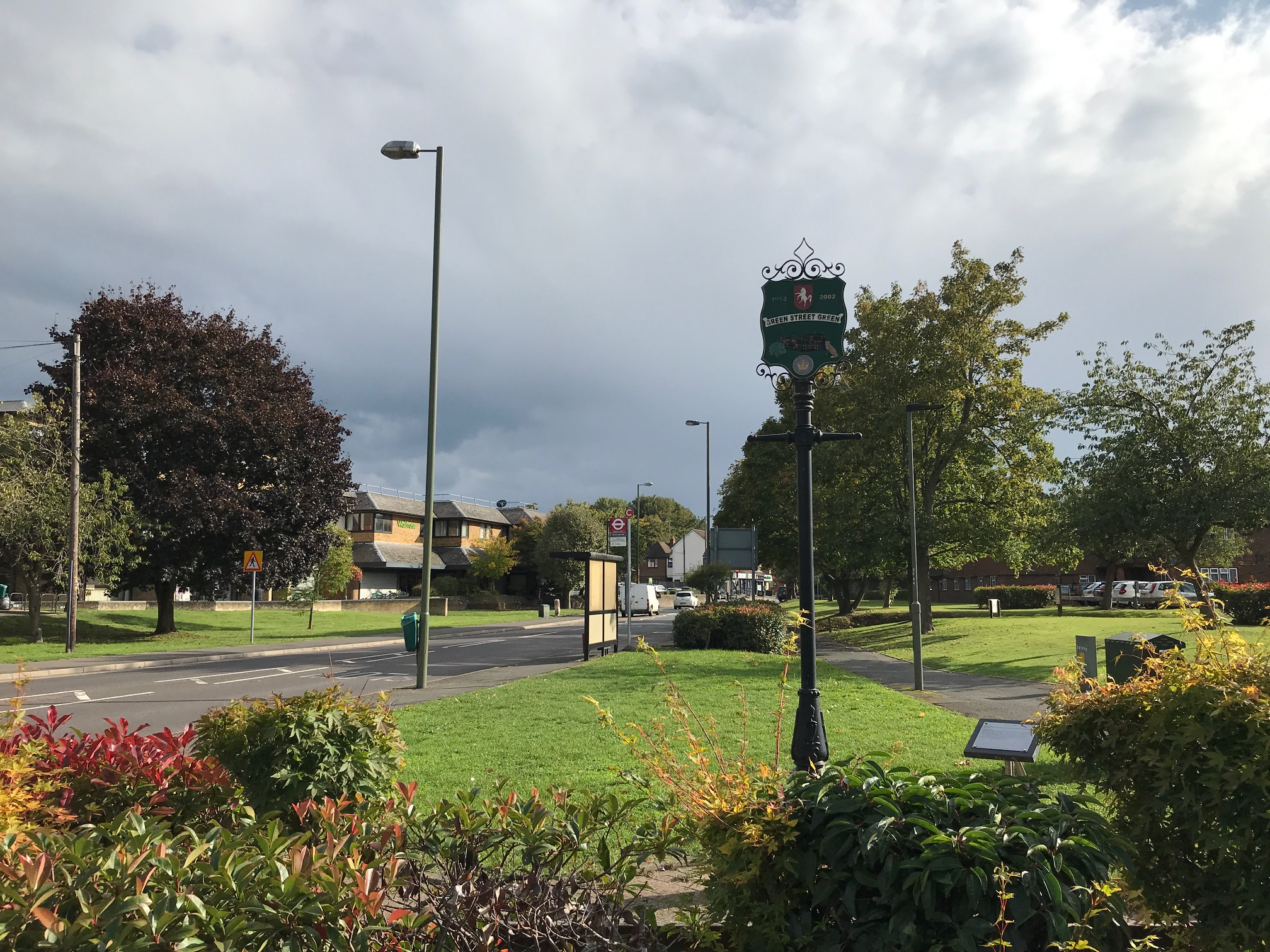
Village sign at the north end of the High Street

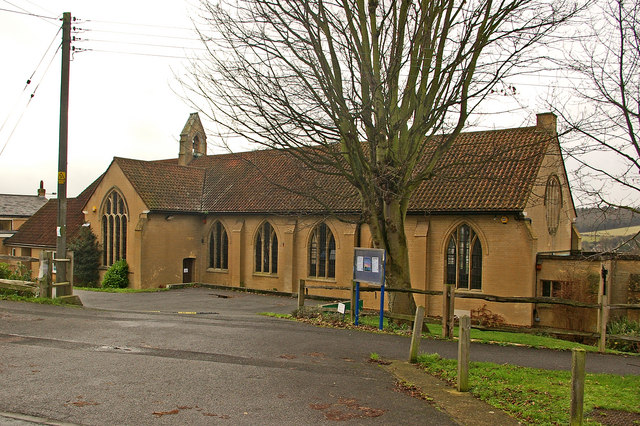
St Mary's Church, Worlds End Lane, built 1937

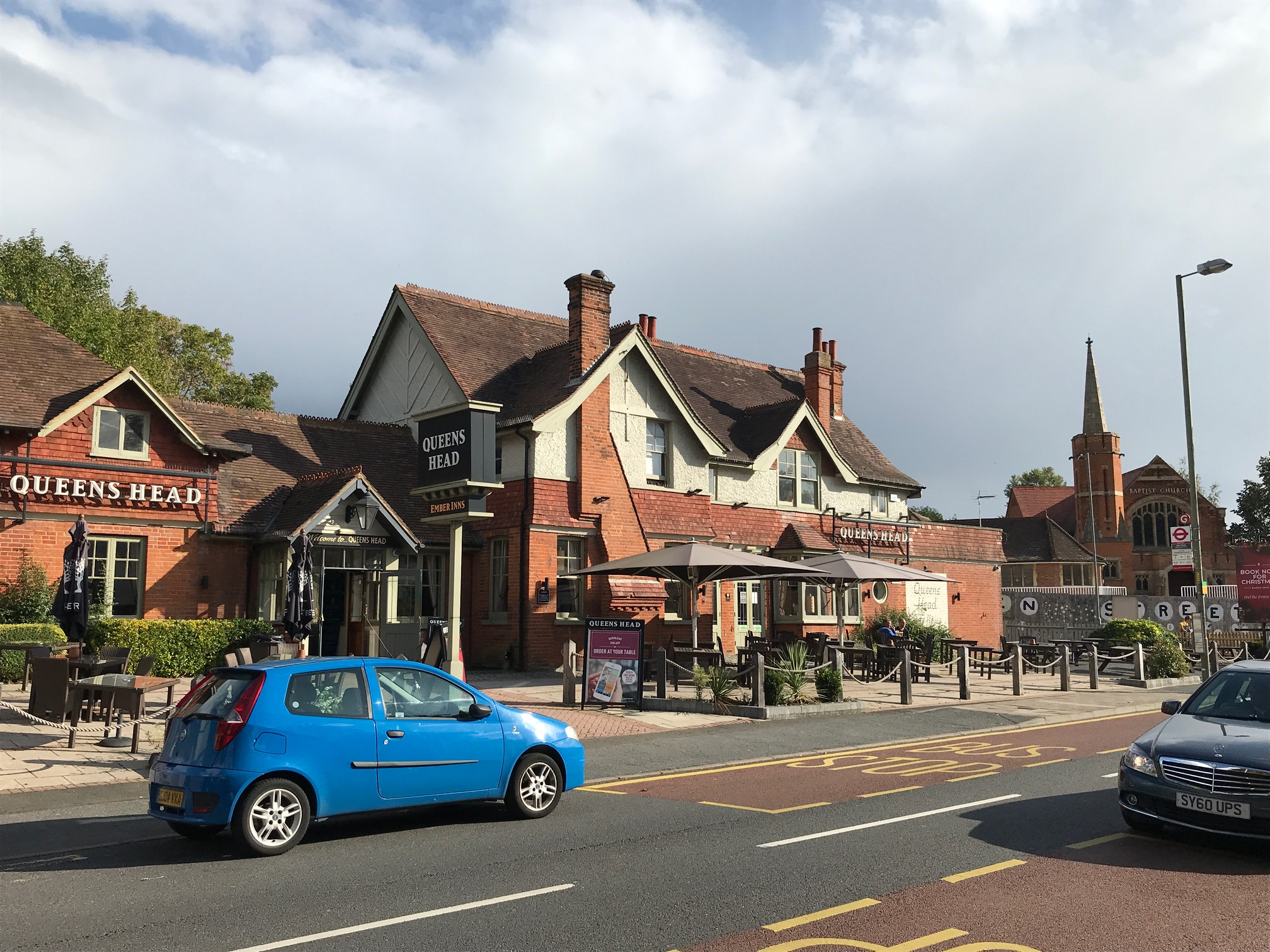
The Queen's Head pub

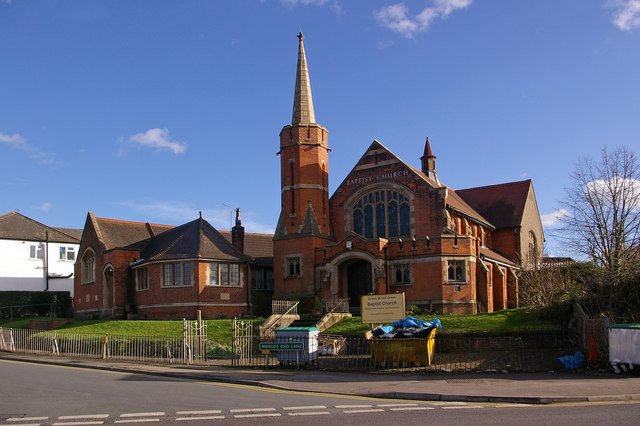
Green Street Green Baptist Church, built 1907

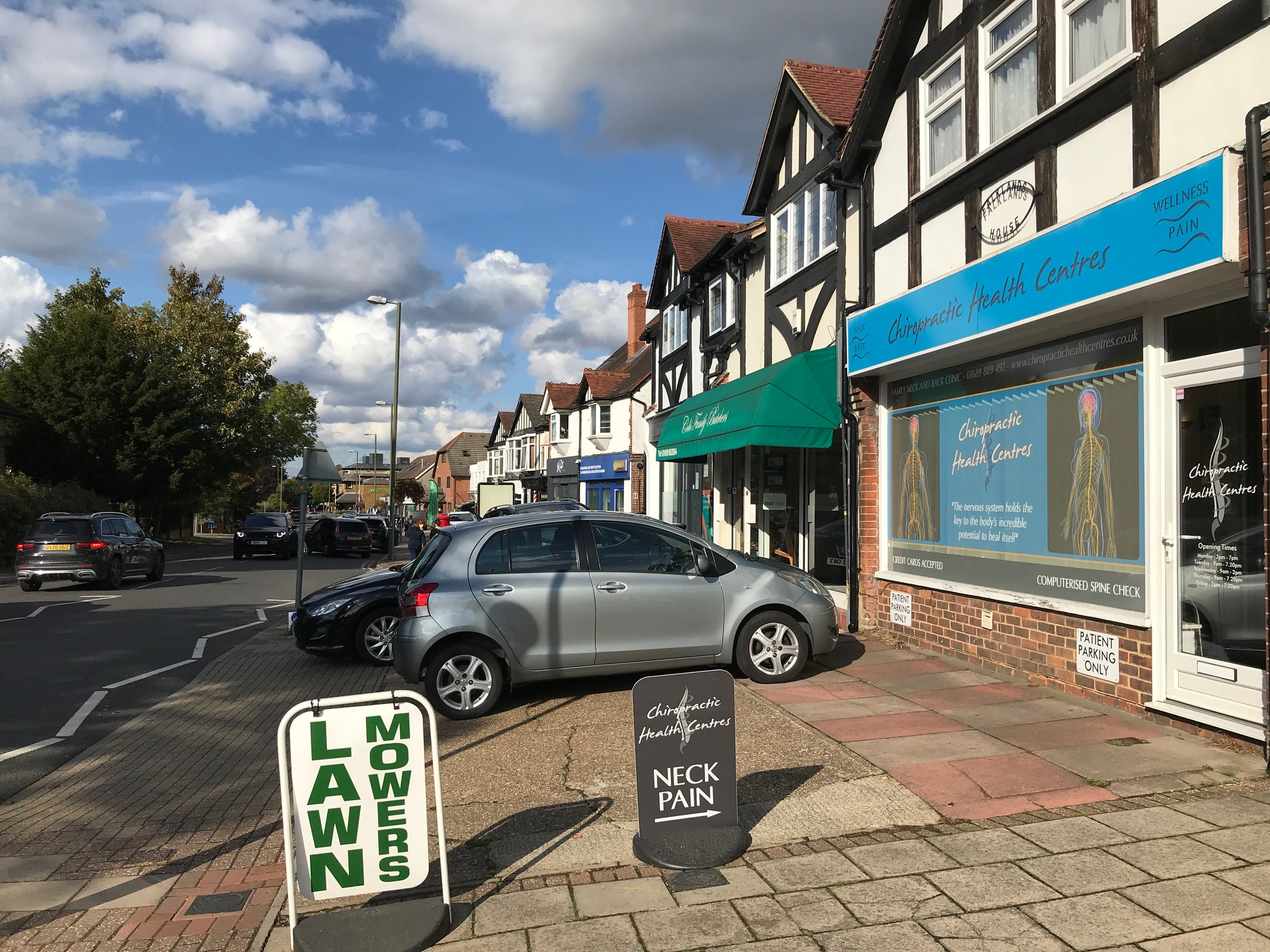
Shops along the High Street

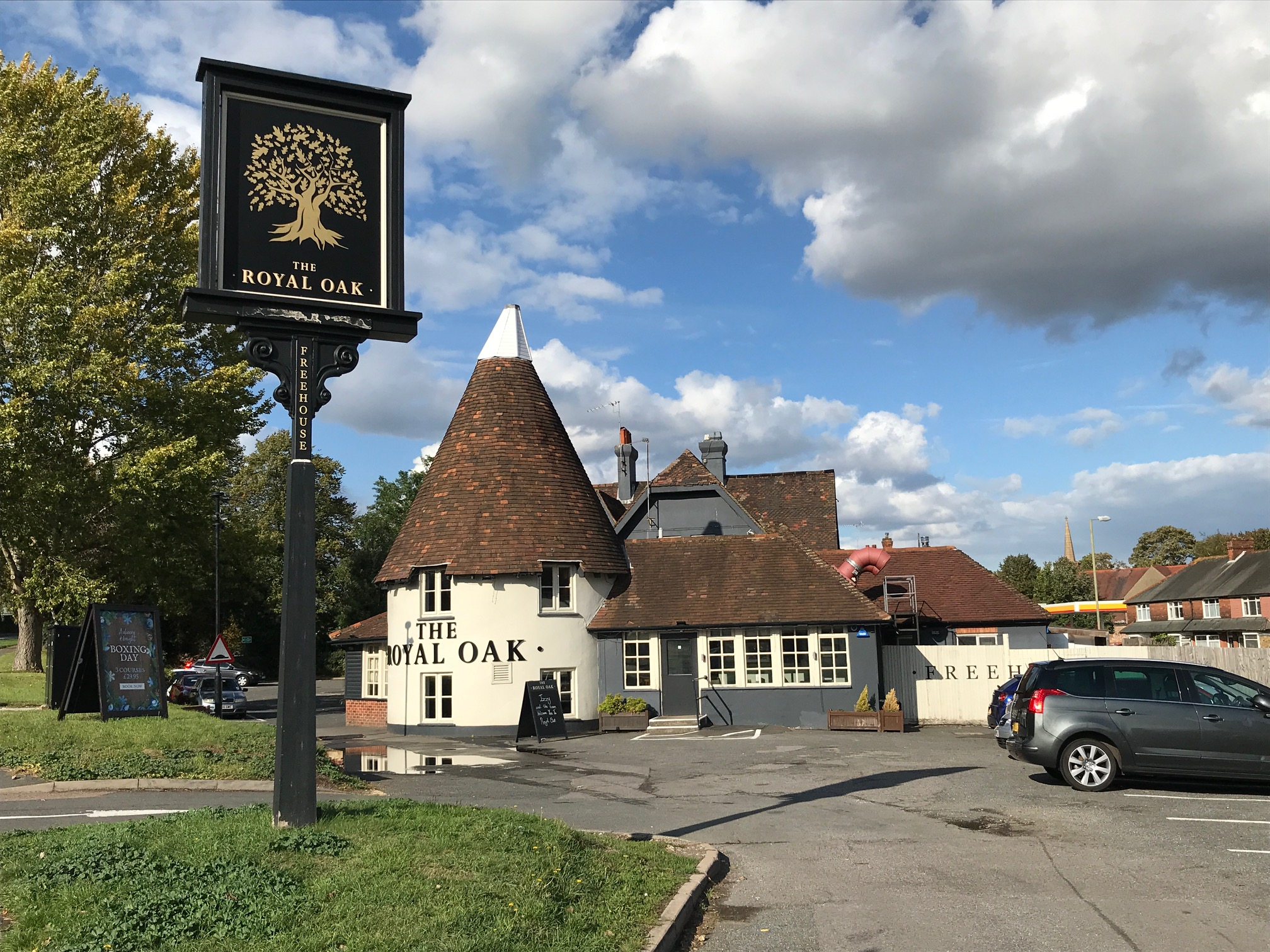
A replica Kentish oast house, now the Royal Oak pub, The Oast House was added to the original pub.

== See also ==
- There is also a hamlet called Green Street Green on the boundary of Darenth and Bean parishes near Dartford.
