= Badgers Mount =

Village in Kent, England

Coordinates: 51.339°N 0.147°E

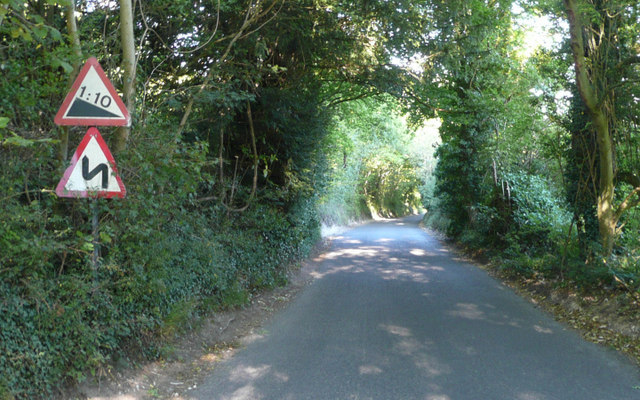
- Shacklands Road

- Location within Kent
- OS grid reference: TQ495625
- Civil parish: Badgers Mount
- District: Sevenoaks
- Shire county: Kent
- Region: South East
- Country: England
- Sovereign state: United Kingdom
- Post town: SEVENOAKS
- Postcode district: TN14
- Dialling code: 01959
- Police: Kent
- Fire: Kent
- Ambulance: South East Coast
- UK Parliament: Sevenoaks

Badgers Mount is a village and civil parish in the Sevenoaks District of Kent, in southeast England. It is 3.6 miles (5.8 km) south east of Orpington and 5.6 miles (9.0 km) north west of Sevenoaks, adjacent to the Kent border with Greater London.

== History ==
Evidence of early settlement can be found in the surrounding countryside, where there are ancient earthworks and an Anglo-Saxon cemetery at Polhill.

'Badgers Mount' appears as the name of a geographical feature, east of the London-Sevenoaks road and adjacent railway tunnel, in an 1871 Ordnance Survey map. The area was sparsely populated until the 19th century arrival of the railway. The establishment of Knockholt railway station (originally 'Halstead for Knockholt') in the 1860s brought more visitors to the area and spurred some suburban growth. However, the village remained a quiet agricultural community through much of the early 20th century.

After World War I, farmland around Badgers Mount was used for residential purposes. This shift was part of the broader suburbanisation of the area as London expanded, and the later M25 motorway brought more access to the Kent countryside.

Until 2015 Badgers Mount was part of the Shoreham parish.

== Local area ==
Badgers Mount is part of the Kent Downs AONB and includes the hamlet of Polhill. Both lie to the west of the Darent Valley Path. The North Downs Way footpath and the Pilgrims' Way, an ancient route for pilgrims travelling to Canterbury, also pass to the south of the area.

== Transport ==
=== Rail ===
The nearest national railway station to Badgers Mount is Knockholt railway station, 1.3 miles (2.1 km) to the northwest. Southeastern operates regular services to London and to nearby towns.

=== Buses ===
Badgers Mount is served by GoBus route 3, which operates on weekdays and connects the village with Orpington and Sevenoaks.

== Notable residents ==
- Dizzee Rascal

== See also ==
- Polhill Bank
