= London Borough of Bromley =

Coordinates: 51°20′N 0°05′E

- London borough
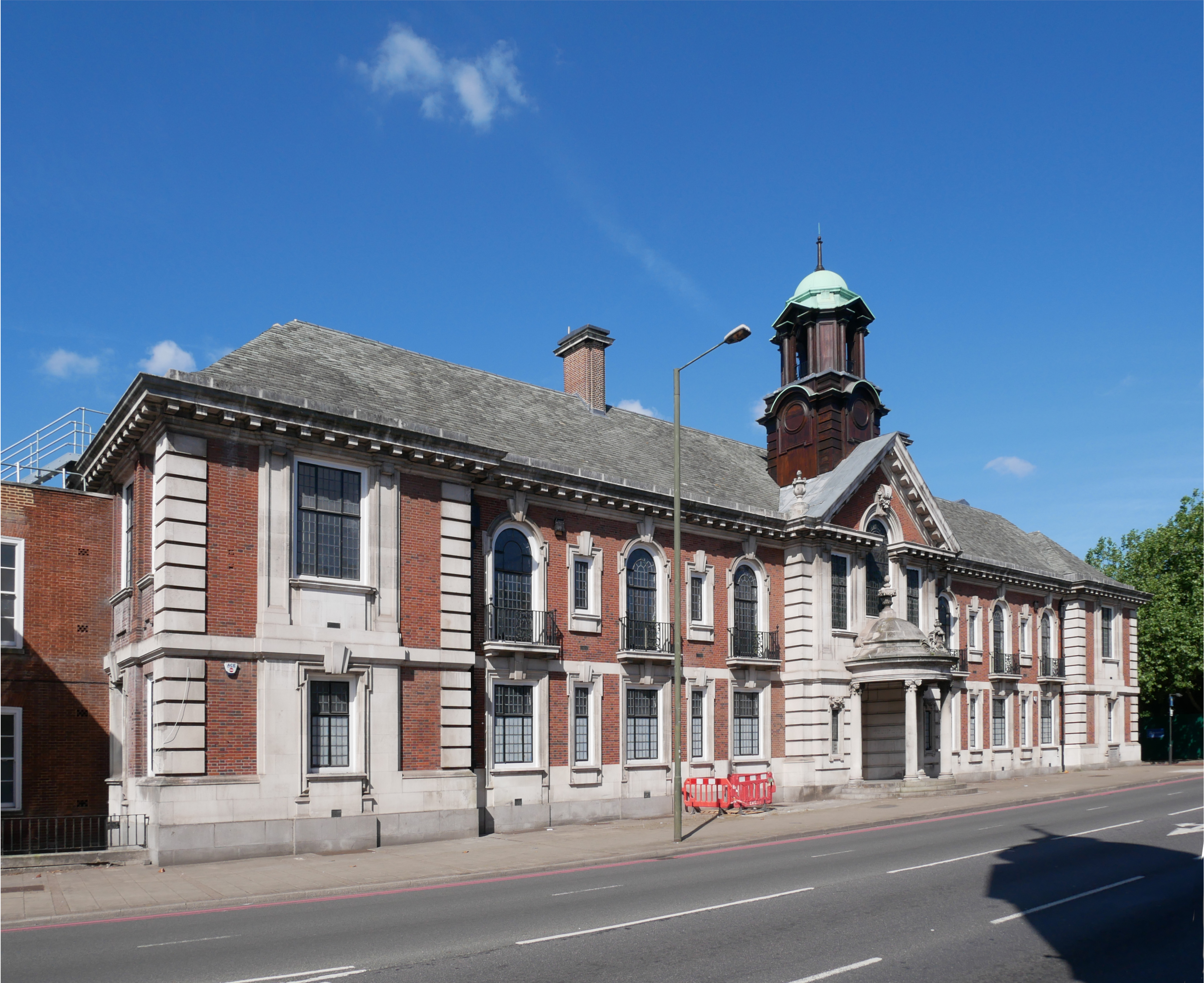
- Bromley Town Hall

- Coat of arms Council logo
- Motto(s): Servire populo (To serve the people)
- Bromley shown within Greater London
- Sovereign state: United Kingdom
- Constituent country: England
- Region: London
- Ceremonial county: Greater London
- Created: 1 April 1965
- Admin HQ: Churchill Court, Bromley

Government
  - Type: London borough council
  - Body: Bromley London Borough Council
  - London Assembly: Thomas Turrell (Conservative) AM for Bexley and Bromley
  - MPs: Gareth Bacon (Conservative); Liam Conlon (Labour); Clive Efford (Labour); Peter Fortune (Conservative)

Area
  - Total: 57.97 sq mi (150.15 km^{2})
  - Rank: 166th (of 296)

Population (2025)
  - Total: 336,048
  - Rank: 33rd (of 296)
  - Density: 5,796.6/sq mi (2,238.1/km^{2})

Ethnicity (2021)
  - Ethnic groups: 76.5% White; 66.5% White British; 8.3% Asian; 7.6% Black; 5.4% Mixed; 2.3% other

Religion (2021)
  - Religion: List: 48.3% Christianity; 37.3% no religion; 3.3% Islam; 6.4% not stated; 2.9% Hinduism; 0.5% other; 0.6% Buddhism; 0.3% Sikhism; 0.3% Judaism
- Time zone: UTC (GMT)
  - Summer (DST): UTC+1 (BST)
- Postcodes: BR, CR, DA, SE, TN
- Area codes: 01689, 01959, 020
- ISO 3166 code: GB-BRY
- ONS code: 00AF
- GSS code: E09000006
- Police: Metropolitan Police
- Website: http://www.bromley.gov.uk/

The London Borough of Bromley (/ˈbrɒmli/) is a borough in Greater London, England. It is the largest and southeasternmost borough in London, and borders the counties of Surrey and Kent; it was part of Kent until 1965. The borough's population in the 2021 census was 329,991. It is named after Bromley, its principal town. Other districts are Penge, Hayes, West Wickham, Chislehurst, Beckenham and Orpington. The local authority is Bromley London Borough Council. (Note: As a borough, the alternative legal form of address, as shown, in most leases granted by it and in older Law Reports is The Mayor and Burgesses of the London Borough of Bromley)

== Geography ==
The borough is the largest in Greater London by area and occupies 59 square miles (153 km^{2}). The majority of the borough is Metropolitan Green Belt, including nearly all of the land south of the A232-A21 route between West Wickham and Pratt's Bottom. Consequently, it is also perhaps the most rural borough, and contains more of the North Downs than any other, as that escarpment is broad between Bromley and Banstead. This is also reflected in its population density, which is the lowest of the 32 London boroughs.

Most of the population lives in the north and west of the borough, with an outlier at Biggin Hill in the far south. The borough shares borders with the London Boroughs of Lewisham and Greenwich to the north, Bexley to the north-east, Southwark and Lambeth to the north-west, and Croydon to the west. It also borders the Sevenoaks District of Kent to the east and south, and the Tandridge District of Surrey to the south-west.

Westerham Heights, the highest point in London and Kent at an altitude of 804 feet (245 m), is on the southern boundary. The Prime Meridian passes through Bromley.

About 30% of the land in Bromley is farmland, the highest figure for a London borough.

== History ==
A local government district called Bromley was created in 1867, covering the parish of Bromley. The neighbouring parish of Beckenham was also made a local government district in 1878. Such districts were reconstituted as urban districts under the Local Government Act 1894. Other urban districts were subsequently created for Penge and Chislehurst in 1900, and Orpington in 1934.

Bromley was incorporated as a municipal borough in 1903, as was Beckenham in 1935. Chislehurst Urban District merged with the neighbouring Sidcup Urban District in 1934.

The modern borough was created in 1965 under the London Government Act 1963, covering the combined areas of the former Municipal Borough of Bromley, Municipal Borough of Beckenham, Orpington Urban District, Penge Urban District and the Chislehurst area from the Chislehurst and Sidcup Urban District (the Sidcup area went to the London Borough of Bexley). Penge Urban District was the only part of the new borough which had been within the boundaries of the London County Council and Metropolitan Board of Works, although it voted to leave in 1899 to become self-governing until 1965. The area was transferred from Kent to Greater London, to become one of the 32 London boroughs.

In 1969, after a local campaign, the village of Knockholt was removed from the borough and transferred to the neighbouring Sevenoaks Rural District; before 1965, it had been part of the Orpington Urban District. Knockholt railway station, however, remains in the borough.

After the Greater London Council was abolished in 1986, its assets were inherited by the London Residuary Body. When the LRB was wound up in turn in 1996, its remaining assets in the area were transferred to Bromley.

== Districts ==
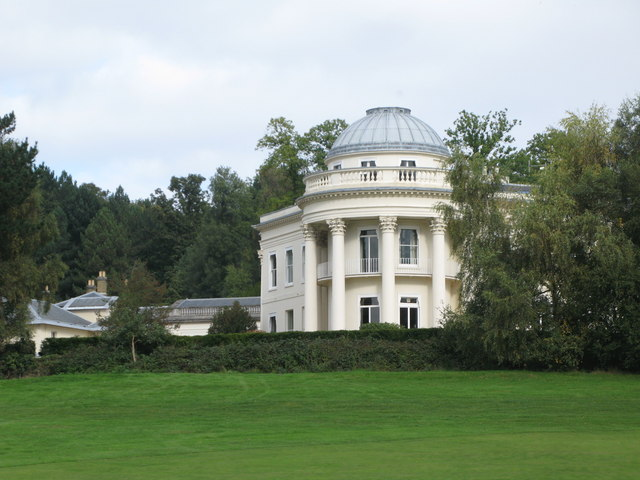
Sundridge Park

The borough is partly urban and partly rural, the former to the north and very much part of the built-up area of suburban London.

The principal parts of the northern section, from west to east, are Beckenham, which includes Eden Park and Elmers End; Bromley with Bickley, Bromley Park and Bromley Common, Park Langley, Plaistow (not to be confused with Plaistow, Newham), Shortlands and Southborough; Chislehurst, with Elmstead and Sundridge. The built-up area around Orpington not only encompasses its direct outskirts of Chelsfield, Crofton, Derry Downs, Goddington, Kevingtown, and Petts Wood; it also includes the erstwhile separate settlements of Farnborough, Green Street Green, Pratt's Bottom, St Mary Cray and St Paul's Cray. Other smaller suburban areas include Penge, Anerley, and parts of nearby Crystal Palace including its park. In addition, parts of Mottingham, Sydenham, Swanley and Ruxley lie within the borough boundaries.

There are two main built-up areas in the southern part of the borough: Hayes and West Wickham. Biggin Hill, Downe and Keston with Leaves Green and Nash are separate, smaller, rural settlements.

Local attractions include Down House (the home of Charles Darwin), Chislehurst Caves, Holwood House (the home of William Pitt the Younger), Crofton Roman Villa, and the site of The Crystal Palace.

== Governance ==
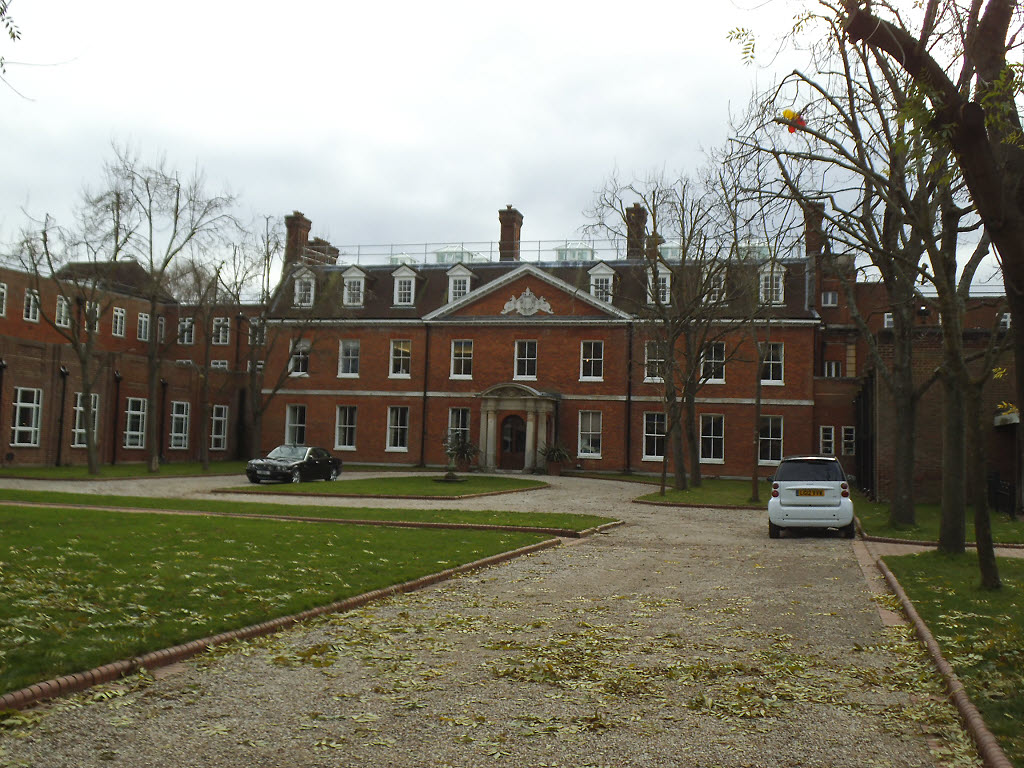
Bromley Civic Centre

The local authority is Bromley Council, based at the Civic Centre at Bromley Palace.

=== Greater London representation ===
Since 2000, for elections to the London Assembly, the borough forms part of the Bexley and Bromley constituency.

== Demographics ==
Population pyramid of the Borough of Bromley

Population
Year	Pop.	±%
1801	8,944	—
1811	10,186	+13.9%
1821	11,455	+12.5%
1831	13,302	+16.1%
1841	14,878	+11.8%
1851	17,192	+15.6%
1861	33,144	+92.8%
1871	49,095	+48.1%
1881	65,046	+32.5%
1891	84,729	+30.3%
1901	99,502	+17.4%
1911	116,851	+17.4%
1921	140,960	+20.6%
1931	170,073	+20.7%
1941	216,821	+27.5%
1951	276,438	+27.5%
1961	290,065	+4.9%
1971	304,414	+4.9%
1981	294,547	−3.2%
1991	294,723	+0.1%
2001	295,560	+0.3%
2011	309,392	+4.7%
2021	329,991	+6.7%
2024 estimate	335,319	+1.6%
Source: A Vision of Britain through time 2024 estimate

In 1801, the civil parishes that form the modern borough had a total population of 8,944. This rose slowly throughout the nineteenth century, as the district became built up; reaching 17,192 in the middle of the century. When the railways arrived, the rate of population growth increased. The population peaked in the 1970s, when industry began to relocate from London.

In the most recent 2021 United Kingdom census, the borough showed a total population of 329,991, up from 309,392 in 2011. All major religions are represented, but of those stating a choice, 48.3% described themselves as Christians: down from 60.7% in 2011.

In 2001, 43.47% of the population were in full-time employment and 11.06% in part-time employment – compared to a London average of 42.64% and 8.62%, respectively. Residents were predominantly owner-occupiers, with 32.53% owning their house outright, and a further 42.73% owning with a mortgage. Only 1.42% were in local authority housing, with a further 12.74% renting from a housing association, or other registered social landlord.

A study in 2017 showed that Bromley had the second lowest poverty rate (15%) of any London borough.

The following table shows the ethnic groups of respondents in censuses up to 2021.

=== Ethnicity ===
Ethnic Group	Year											
Ethnic Group	1971 est.		1981 est.		1991 census		2001 census		2011 census		2021 census	
Ethnic Group	Number	%	Number	%	Number	%	Number	%	Number	%	Number	%
White: Total	–	98.1%	280,764	96.4%	277,028	95.3%	270,666	91.59%	260,870	84.32%	252,295	76.5%
White: British	–	–	–	–	–	–	255,618	86.49%	239,478	77.40%	219,493	66.5%
White: Irish	–	–	–	–	–	–	4,652	1.57%	4,463	1.44%	4,954	1.5%
White: Gypsy or Irish Traveller	–	–	–	–	–	–	–	–	580	0.19%	578	0.2%
White: Roma	–	–	–	–	–	–	–	–	–	–	551	0.2%
White: Other	–	–	–	–	–	–	10,396	3.52%	16,349	5.28%	26,719	8.1%
Asian or Asian British: Total	–	–	–	–	6,746	2.32%	9,349	3.16%	16,067	5.19%	27,307	8.1%
Asian or Asian British: Indian	–	–	–	–	3,126	1.1%	4,458	1.51%	6,215	2.01%	12,326	3.7%
Asian or Asian British: Pakistani	–	–	–	–	379	0.1%	691	0.23%	1,014	0.33%	1,784	0.5%
Asian or Asian British: Bangladeshi	–	–	–	–	436	0.2%	868	0.29%	1,265	0.41%	1,748	0.5%
Asian or Asian British: Chinese	–	–	–	–	1,160	0.4%	1,799	0.61%	2,768	0.89%	5,075	1.5%
Asian or Asian British: Other Asian	–	–	–	–	1,645	0.6%	1,533	0.52%	4,805	1.55%	6,374	1.9%
Black or Black British: Total	–	–	–	–	4,548	1.56%	8,614	2.91%	18,686	6.04%	25,149	7.6%
Black or Black British: African	–	–	–	–	990		3,373	1.14%	9,819	3.17%	13,193	4.0%
Black or Black British: Caribbean	–	–	–	–	2,562		4,637	1.57%	6,609	2.14%	8,169	2.5%
Black or Black British: Other Black	–	–	–	–	996		604	0.20%	2,258	0.73%	3,787	1.1%
Mixed or British Mixed: Total	–	–	–	–	–	–	5,516	1.87%	10,897	3.52%	17,740	5.3%
Mixed: White and Black Caribbean	–	–	–	–	–	–	1,887	0.64%	3,897	1.26%	5,489	1.7%
Mixed: White and Black African	–	–	–	–	–	–	577	0.20%	1,335	0.43%	2,431	0.7%
Mixed: White and Asian	–	–	–	–	–	–	1,716	0.58%	3,016	0.97%	4,747	1.4%
Mixed: Other Mixed	–	–	–	–	–	–	1,336	0.45%	2,649	0.86%	5,073	1.5%
Other: Total	–	–	–	–	2,287	0.78%	1,387	0.47%	2,872	0.93%	7,500	2.3%
Other: Arab	–	–	–	–	–	–	–	–	870	0.28%	1,203	0.4%
Other: Any other ethnic group	–	–	–	–	2,287	0.78%	1,387	0.47%	2,002	0.65%	6,297	1.9%
Ethnic minority: Total	–	1.9%	10,477	3.6%	13,581	4.7%	24,866	8.41%	48,522	15.68%	77,696	23.5%
Total	–	100%	291,241	100%	290,609	100%	295,532	100.00%	309,392	100.00%	329,991	100%

=== Religion ===
Religious identities of Bromley residents
Religion	2001		2011		2021	
Religion	Number	%	Number	%	Number	%
Holds religious beliefs	224,673	76.0	204,895	66.2	185,730	56.3
Christian	212,871	72.0	187,656	60.7	159,452	48.3
Muslim	4,926	1.7	7,841	2.5	10,876	3.3
Sikh	600	0.2	736	0.2	1,068	0.3
Hindu	3,350	1.1	4,987	1.6	9,644	2.9
Buddhist	953	0.3	1,580	0.5	2,100	0.6
Jewish	1,098	0.4	957	0.3	966	0.3
Other religion	875	0.3	1,138	0.4	1,704	0.5
No religion	48,279	16.3	80,303	26.0	122,943	37.3
Religion not stated	22,580	7.7	24,194	7.8	21,238	6.4
Total population	295,532	100.0	309,392	100.0	329,991	100.0

=== Immigration ===
This list includes top-15 sources of immigration to Borough of Bromley for 2021 census:

#	Country	Number
1	India	6,842
2	Nigeria	3,515
3	Ireland	2,942
4	Poland	2,826
5	Romania	2,426
6	South Africa	1,939
7	Italy	1,872
8	Jamaica	1,753
9	China	1,738
10	Sri Lanka	1,514
11	Brazil	1,499
12	France	1,403
13	Philippines	1,324
14	Germany	1,285
15	United States	1,225

== Transport ==
Bromley is one of only six London Boroughs with no London Underground station within its boundaries. However, the borough has many railway stations served by London Overground, Thameslink, Southeastern and Southern. The borough also has several stops on the Tramlink network.

Stations operated by London Overground (all are also served by Southern):

- Anerley
- Crystal Palace
- Penge West

National Rail stations:

- Birkbeck
- Beckenham Junction
- Shortlands
- Bromley North
- Bromley South
- St Mary Cray
- Sundridge Park
- Ravensbourne
- Bickley
- Elmstead Woods
- Chislehurst
- Petts Wood
- Orpington
- Chelsfield
- Knockholt
- Kent House
- Penge East
- Lower Sydenham (shared with Lewisham)
- New Beckenham
- Clock House
- Elmers End
- Eden Park
- West Wickham
- Hayes

Tramlink stops:

- Beckenham Junction
- Beckenham Road
- Avenue Road
- Birkbeck
- Elmers End

In March 2011, the main forms of transport that residents used to travel to work were: driving a car or van, 27.4% of all residents aged 16–74; train, 5.1%; bus, minibus or coach, 5.1%; on foot, 4.3%; work mainly at or from home, 4.0%; underground, metro, light rail, tram, 2.3%; passenger in a car or van, 1.5%.

== Sport, leisure and culture ==
The Borough has several sporting clubs:

- Bromley F.C. a football club in EFL League One
- Cray Wanderers F.C. a Non-League football club
- Orpington F.C. a Non-League football club
- Holmesdale F.C. a Non-League football club
- Greenwich Borough F.C. a Non-League football club
- Beckenham Town F.C. a Non-League football club
- Club Langley FC a Non-League football club
- Orpington & District Amateur Boxing Club

The borough is also home to an extensive libraries service, containing 14 branches, currently operated by Greenwich Leisure Limited under their trademark Better on behalf of Bromley council.

- The Beckenham Comedy Cabaret, a monthly comedy cabaret event, hosted and run by Jody Kamali, has been running in the heart of Beckenham since 2015, usually on the last Friday evening of the month.
- Allegri Singers — Chamber choir created in 1981, currently with 40 voices performing a wide variety of choral music. Entry by audition. 4-5 concerts a year
- Bromley Blues Club - Typically hosted monthly on a Sunday at the Bromley Little Theatre (which is a rest-day for whichever theatrical show is on), it is run in conjunction with genre experts Mississippi MacDonald and the Bourne Music Club have had notable artists from the UK and Worldwide Blues scene.

The Bromley Times and Bromley News Shopper publish local news in the borough.

== London Fire Brigade ==
London Fire Brigade has four fire stations within the London Borough of Bromley. The borough is the largest in the city: about 150 km^{2}. With just one pumping appliance, Orpington has one of the largest areas to cover in London, measuring 46.7 km^{2}. In 2006/2007, Orpington attended 1,308 incidents. There is also a high volume pump at the station. Beckenham, Bromley and Biggin Hill cover the rest of the borough with four pumping appliances and a hose layer.

In 2006/2007 just under 4000 incidents were attended in the borough. Noticeably, compared to 2005/2006 there was an 11% decrease in special service calls (road traffic collisions, chemical incidents, flooding etc.).

== Twin towns ==
Bromley is twinned with:

- Neuwied, Rhineland-Palatinate, Germany.

== Notable residents ==
The locations a number of notable residents over the years have been lived have been recognised with blue plaques these residents include:

- Alexander Muirhead – electrical engineer specialising in wireless telegraphy (1848–1920)
- Benjamin Waterhouse Hawkins – sculptor and natural history artist (1807–1889)
- Brass Crosby (1725–1793)
- Charles Keeping (1924–1988)
- David Bowie (1947–2016)
- Doctor John Fry (1922–1994)
- Enid Blyton – author (1897–1968)
- Ewan MacColl – political songwriter and playwright (1915–1989)
- Frank Bourne – soldier (1855–1945)
- Harold Bride – wireless operator aboard RMS Titanic (1890–1956)
- Heddle Nash – opera singer (1895–1961)
- H. G. Wells – author (1866–1946)
- Ira Aldridge – actor (1807–1867)
- John Pennington Harman VC – Soldier (1914–1944)
- Joseph Paxton – English gardener, architect and Member of Parliament
- Little Tich (Harry Relph) – 4-foot-6-inch-tall (137 cm) English music hall comedian and dancer (1867–1928)
- Lord Ted Willis – playwright and author (1918–1992)
- Prince Pyotr (Peter) Alekseyevich Kropotkin (1842–1921)
- Rachel and Margaret McMillan
- Richmal Crompton – author (1890–1969)
- Sir Geraint Evans(1922–1992)
- Sir John Lubbock, the First Lord Avebury (1834–1913)
- Sir Malcolm Campbell – world land and water speed record holder (1885–1948)
- Sir Victor Shepheard – naval architect (1893–1989)
- Thomas Crapper – plumber (1837–1910)
- W. G. Grace – cricket player (1848–1915)
- Walter de la Mare – short story writer, and novelist (1873–1956)
- William Pitt, 1st Earl of Chatham (1708–1778)
- Alan Watts – writer, speaker and self-styled "philosophical entertainer" (1915–1973)
- William Willett (1856–1915)

== See also ==
- Bromley parks and open spaces
- List of churches in the London Borough of Bromley
