= Chelsfield =

Area of southeast London, England

Coordinates: 51.358155°N 0.127800°E

- Village
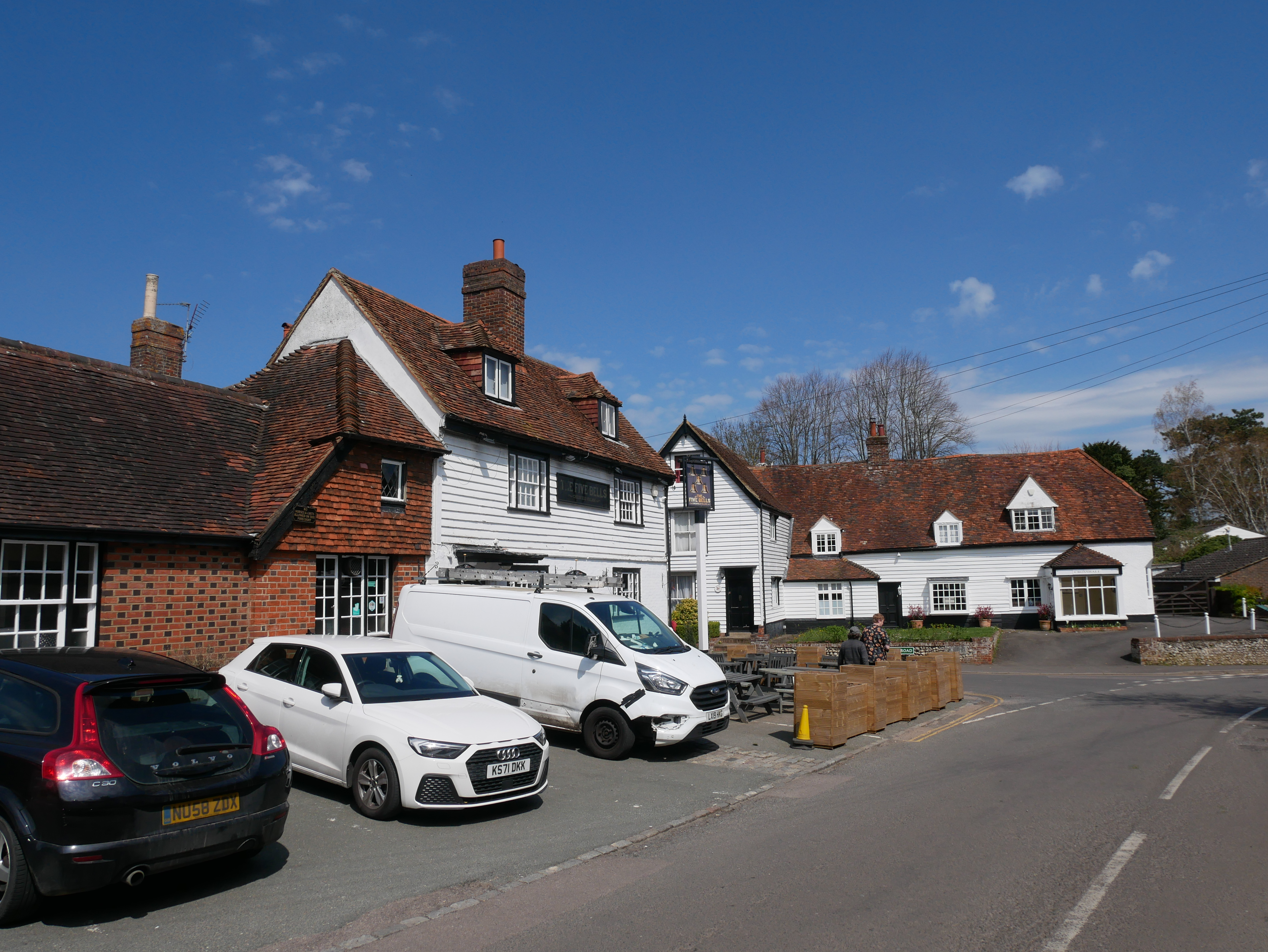

- Location within Greater London
- Population: 14,507 (2011 Census. Chelsfield and Pratts Bottom Ward)
- OS grid reference: TQ482642
- London borough: Bromley
- Ceremonial county: Greater London
- Region: London
- Country: England
- Sovereign state: United Kingdom
- Post town: ORPINGTON
- Postcode district: BR6
- Dialling code: 01689
- Police: Metropolitan
- Fire: London
- Ambulance: London
- UK Parliament: Orpington
- London Assembly: Bexley and Bromley

Chelsfield is an area in southeast London, England, within the London Borough of Bromley and, prior to 1965, in the historic county of Kent. It lies south of Goddington, west of Well Hill, north of Pratt's Bottom and east of Green Street Green. The area is split into two distinct areas – the historic 'village' section, and the newer development by the railway station.

== History ==
The name is recorded in the Domesday Book of 1086 as "Cillesfelle", meaning "land of a man called Cēol". Another older variant was 'Chilesfeld'. The village church was constructed in the early Norman period, and gives its names to the Five Bells pubs. Chelsfield was historically a stopping place for drovers.

In 1868 Chelsfield station was opened, however, it was located 1 mile west of the village. As a result, in 1925 land near the station was bought by Homesteads Ltd. and developed for housing, thus creating what is sometimes referred to as 'New Chelsfield.' Further development occurred after the Second World War, with New Chelsfield eventually merging with Green Street Green and Goddington, however the introduction of the London Green Belt stymied development around the village. The New Chelsfield area is now largely a commuter suburb.

== Governance ==
Chelsfield once formed an ancient parish, and later civil parish of 3,378 acres (14 km^{2}), in Kent. The parish included Green Street Green and Pratt's Bottom and stretched as far as Cudham and Orpington. Circa 1894, it was part of the Bromley Rural District. The parish was abolished in 1934 and its former area became part of the Orpington parish and urban district. At the 1931 census (the last before the abolition of the parish), Chelsfield had a population of 2853. In 1965 it was transferred to Greater London, to form part of the London Borough of Bromley.

== Geography ==
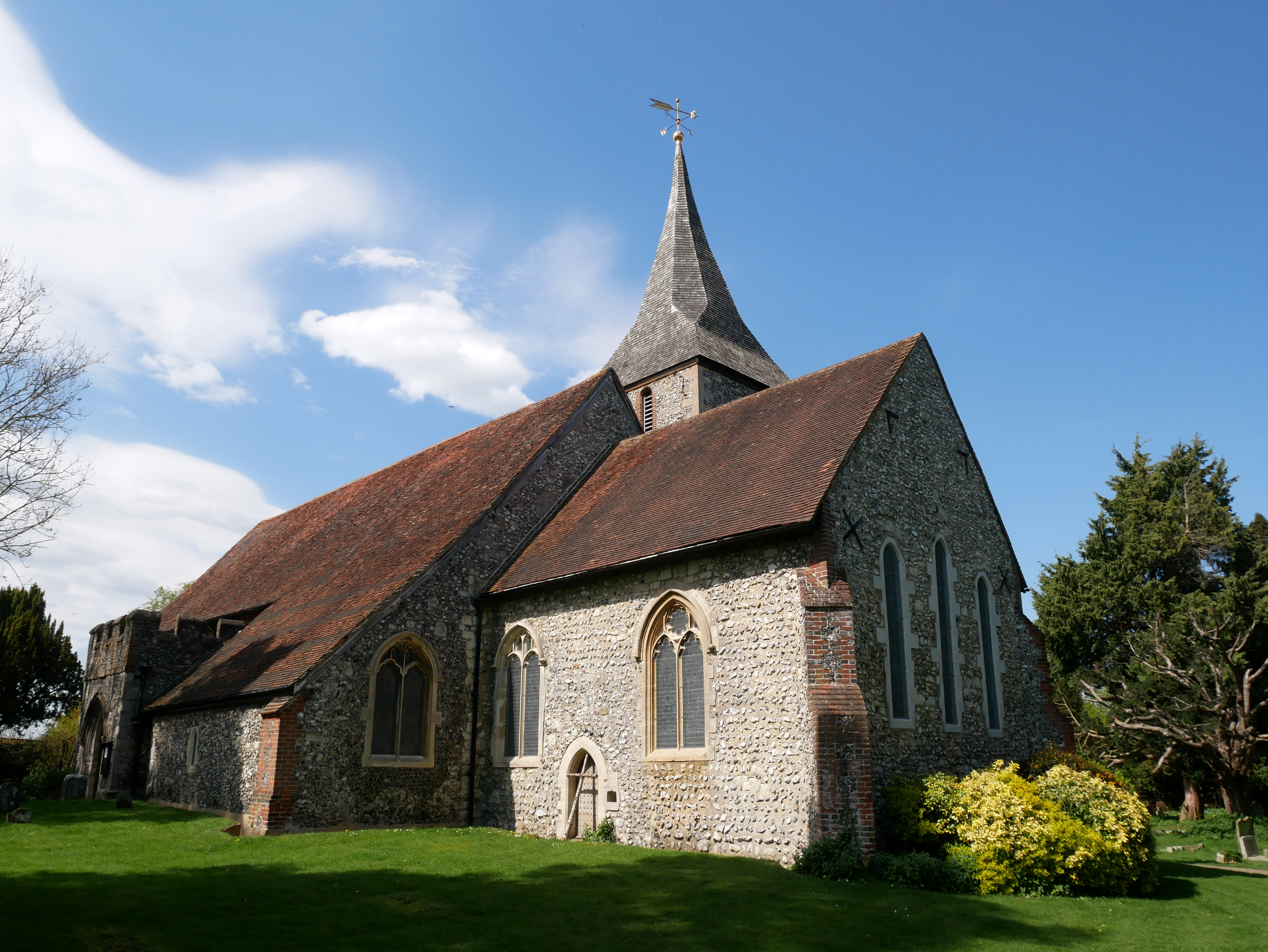
St Martin of Tours church

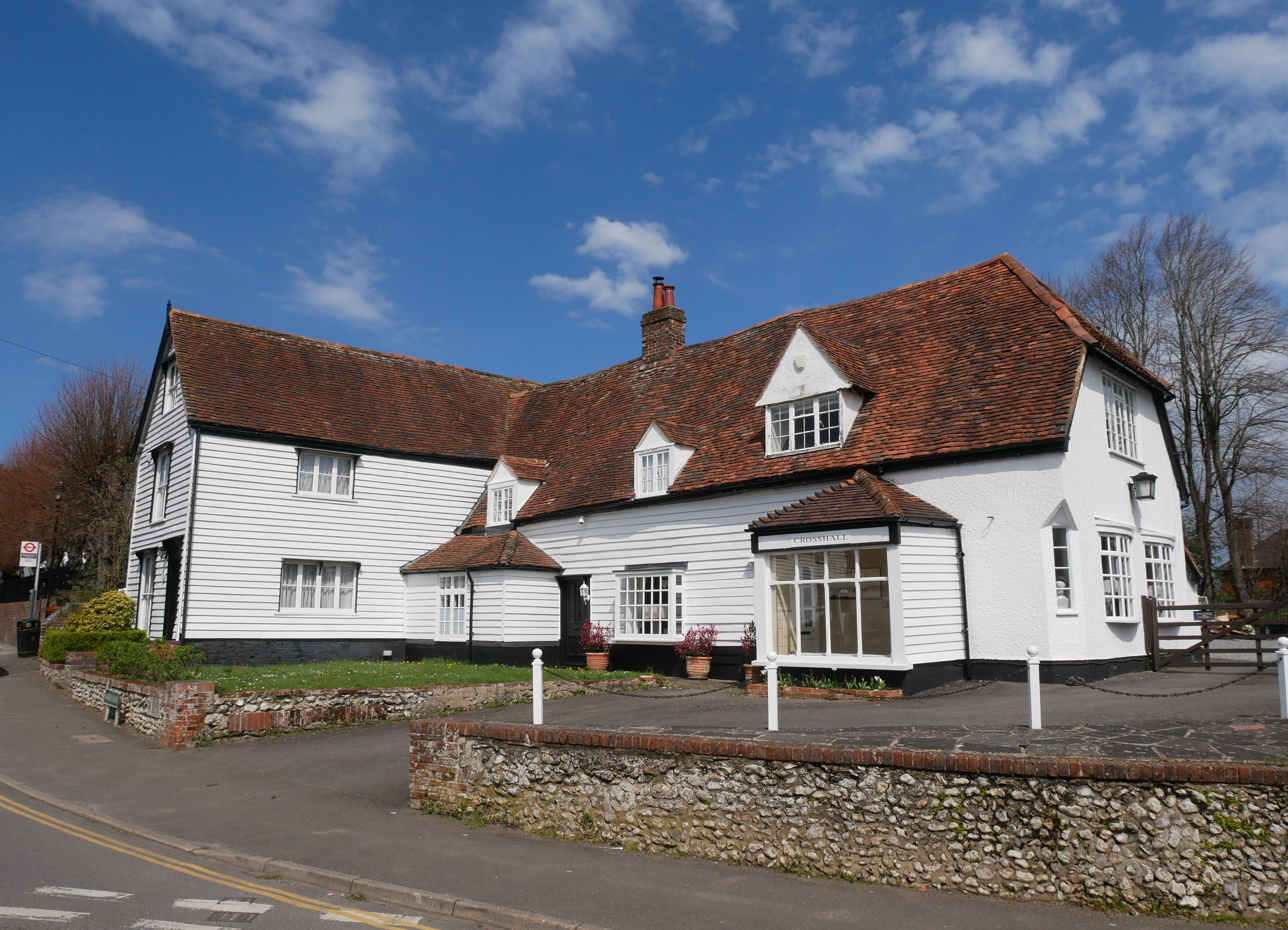
Crosshall, a partly 18th-century, Grade II listed building in Chelsfield

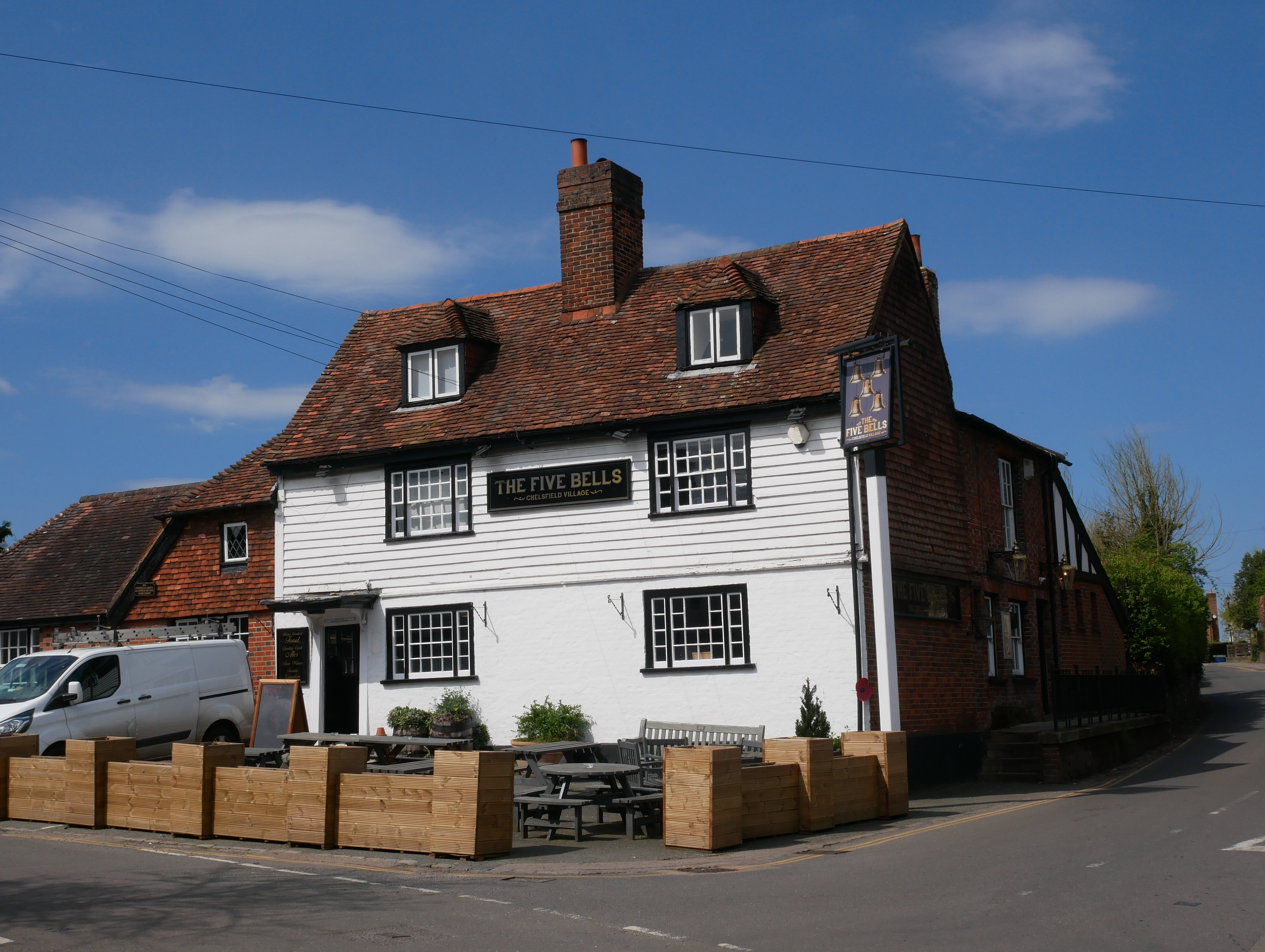
The Five Bells, a Grade II listed pub in Chelsfield

In practice, Chelsfield is split into two very distinct areas: the historic Chelsfield Village sited to the east of the main Orpington bypass (the A224) and New Chelsfield, which grew up in the first half of the 20th century after the sale of some of the Waring family estates. The A224, known as Court Road, now separates the historic village from its Anglican church which is dedicated to St Martin of Tours and which dates back, in parts, to the 12th Century. Chelsfield is part of the Chelsfield ward for elections to Bromley London Borough Council.

== Transport ==
Chelsfield station connects the area with National Rail services northbound to London Charing Cross via Orpington and Lewisham and southbound to Sevenoaks. Connections can be made at Orpington for London Victoria via Bromley South and Brixton, and at Sevenoaks for Hastings via Tunbridge Wells and to Ramsgate via Ashford International and Canterbury West.. There are also three peak time trains in each direction in the morning and afternoon.

Chelsfield is served by the Transport for London bus route R1 to St Paul's Cray via Orpington and to Green Street Green and the R7 to Chislehurst via Orpington. It also has Go-Coach route S32 running a morning bus (school day exclusive) to Trinity School, Sevenoaks via Knole Academy and an afternoon bus to Kemnal Technology College via St Mary Cray.

Knockholt railway station is on the South Eastern Main Line, located in the London Borough of Bromley, Greater London. It is 16 miles 44 chains (26.6 km) down the line from London Charing Cross and is situated between Chelsfield and Dunton Green stations. It is in London fare zone 6 and is located next to the Greater London boundary with the Kent district of Sevenoaks. The boundary is the farm bridge at the southern end of the platforms.

== Notable residents ==
- Brass Crosby (1725–1793) – 18th Century parliamentarian and one-time Lord Mayor of London, lived at Court Lodge where he is commemorated with a blue plaque.
- Edith Nesbit (1858–1924) – children's author who lived nearby Halstead; her Railway Children is said to have been inspired by her frequent use of Chelsfield station.
- Michael Oakeshott (1901–1990) – philosopher and political theorist, born in Chelsfield.
- Miss Read (1913–2012, birth name Dora Jessie Saint) – author, spent most her childhood in Chelsfield.
- Gary Rhodes (1960–2019) – television chef, lived in Chelsfield.
- Ken Wood (manufacturer) spent his teens in Chelsfield.

== Gallery ==
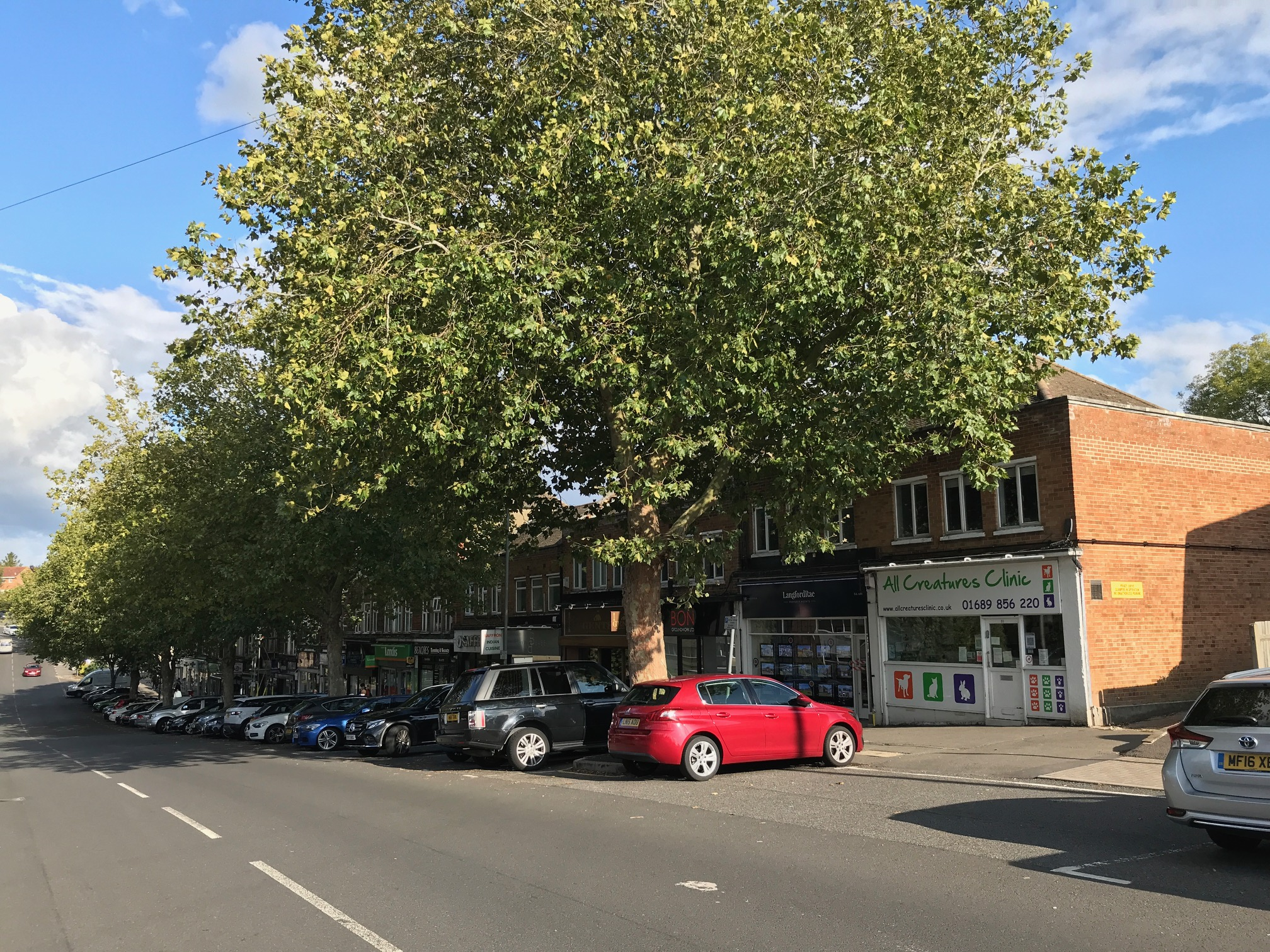
Shops on Windsor Drive, New Chelsfield

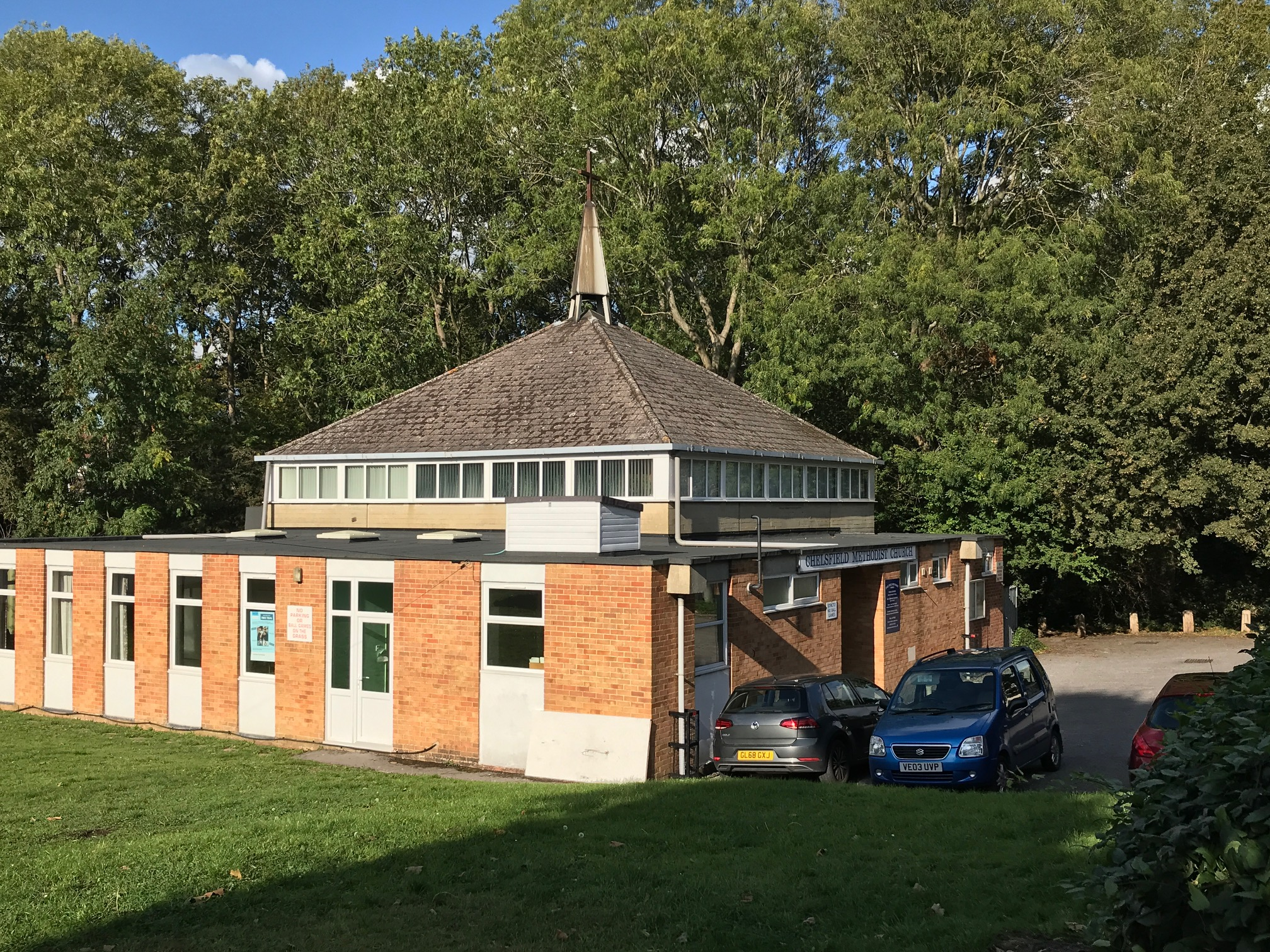
Methodist Church, New Chelsfield

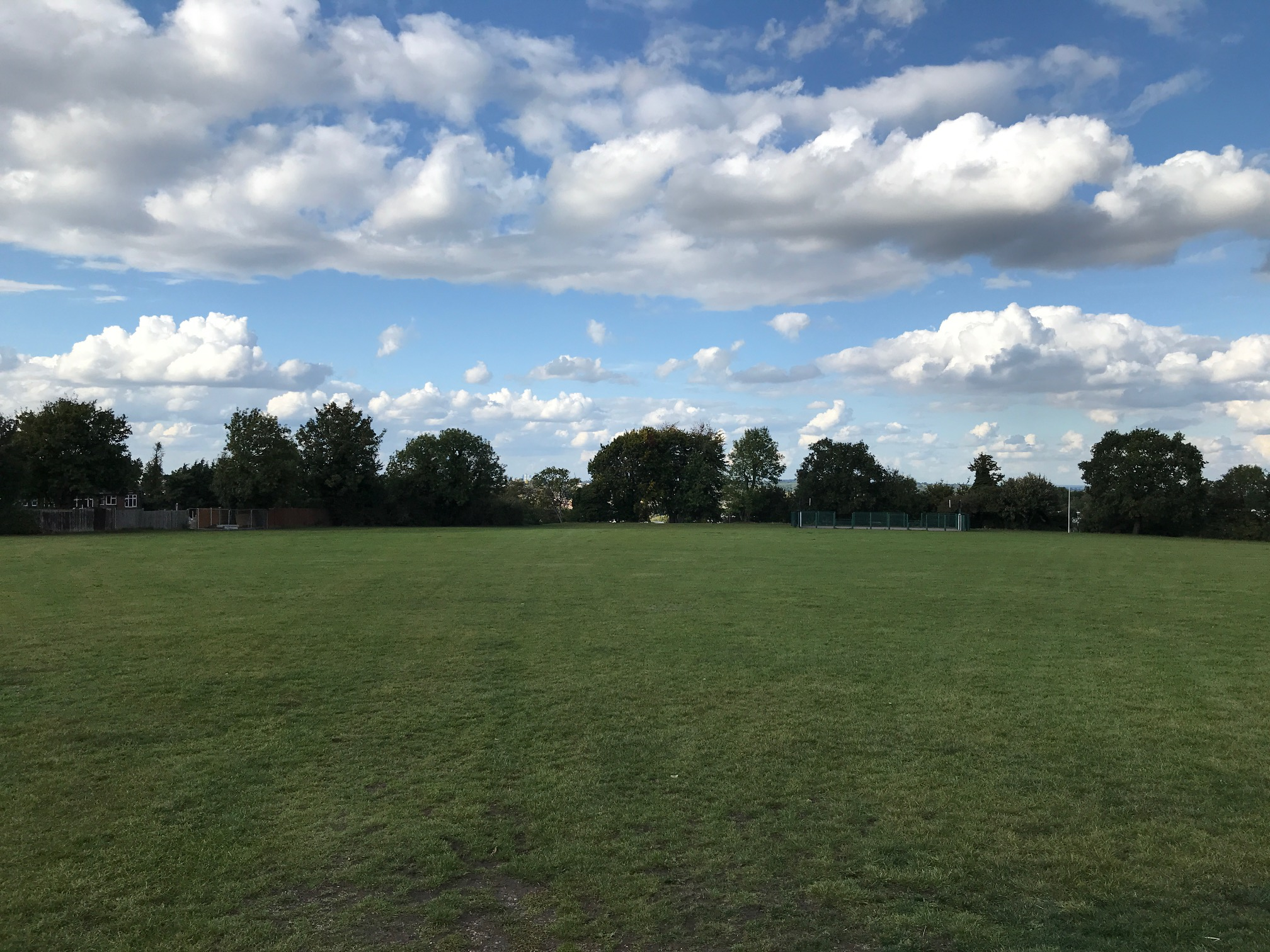
Glentrammon Recreation Ground, New Chelsfield

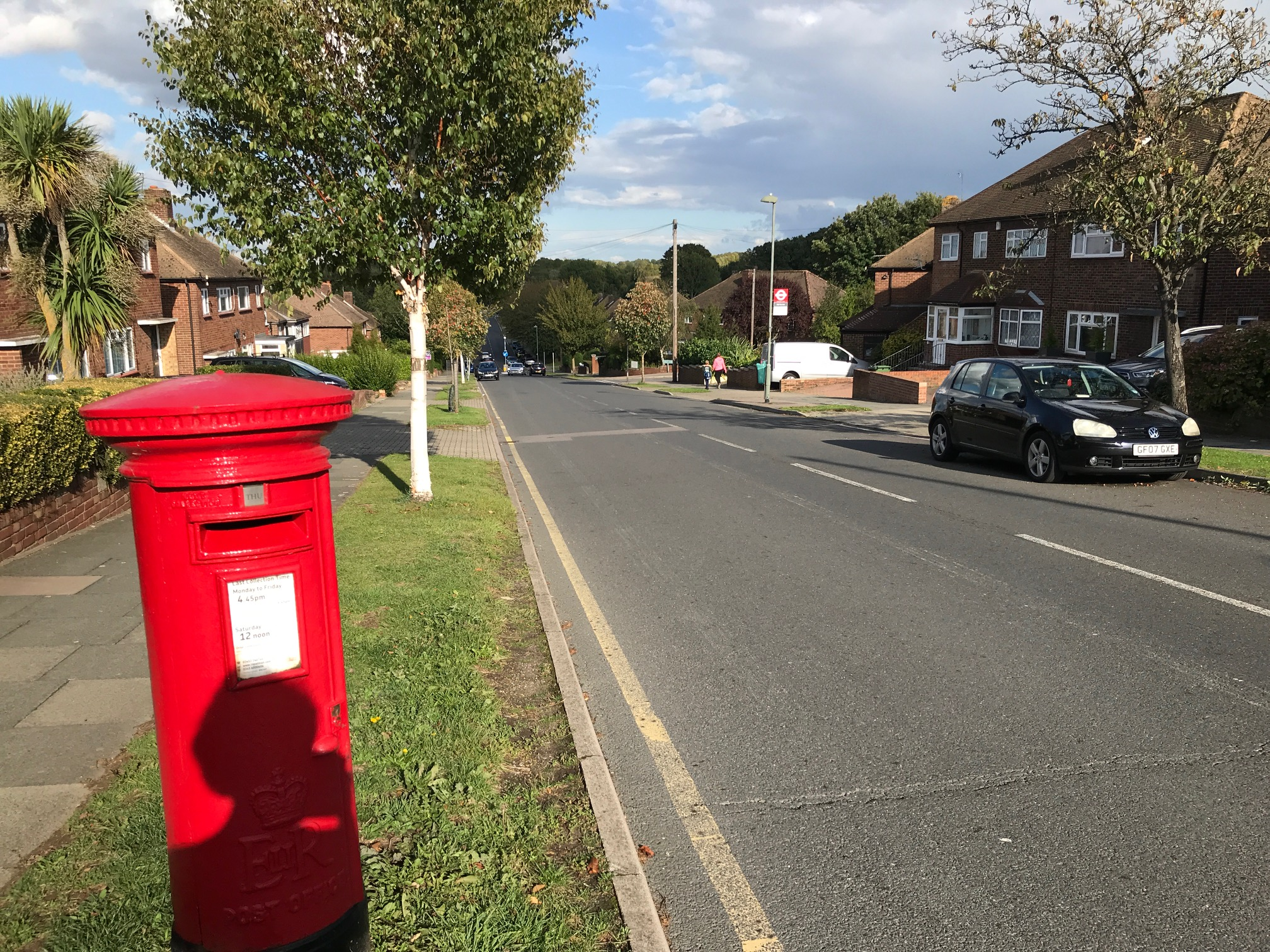
Windsor Drive, New Chelsfield

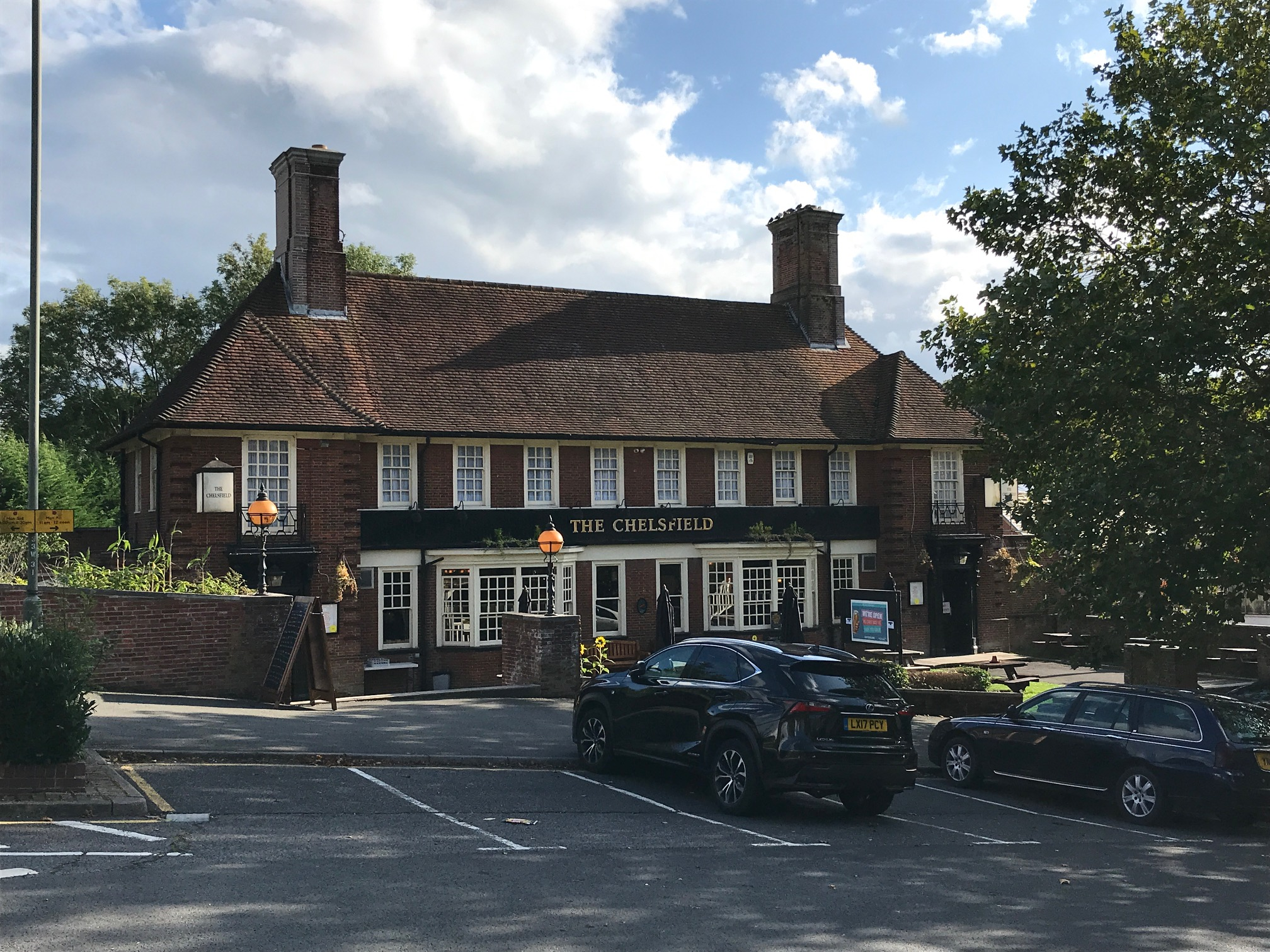
The Chelsfield pub, New Chelsfield
