= Farnborough, London =

Village in Greater London, England

Coordinates: 51.3591°N 0.0741°E

Farnborough
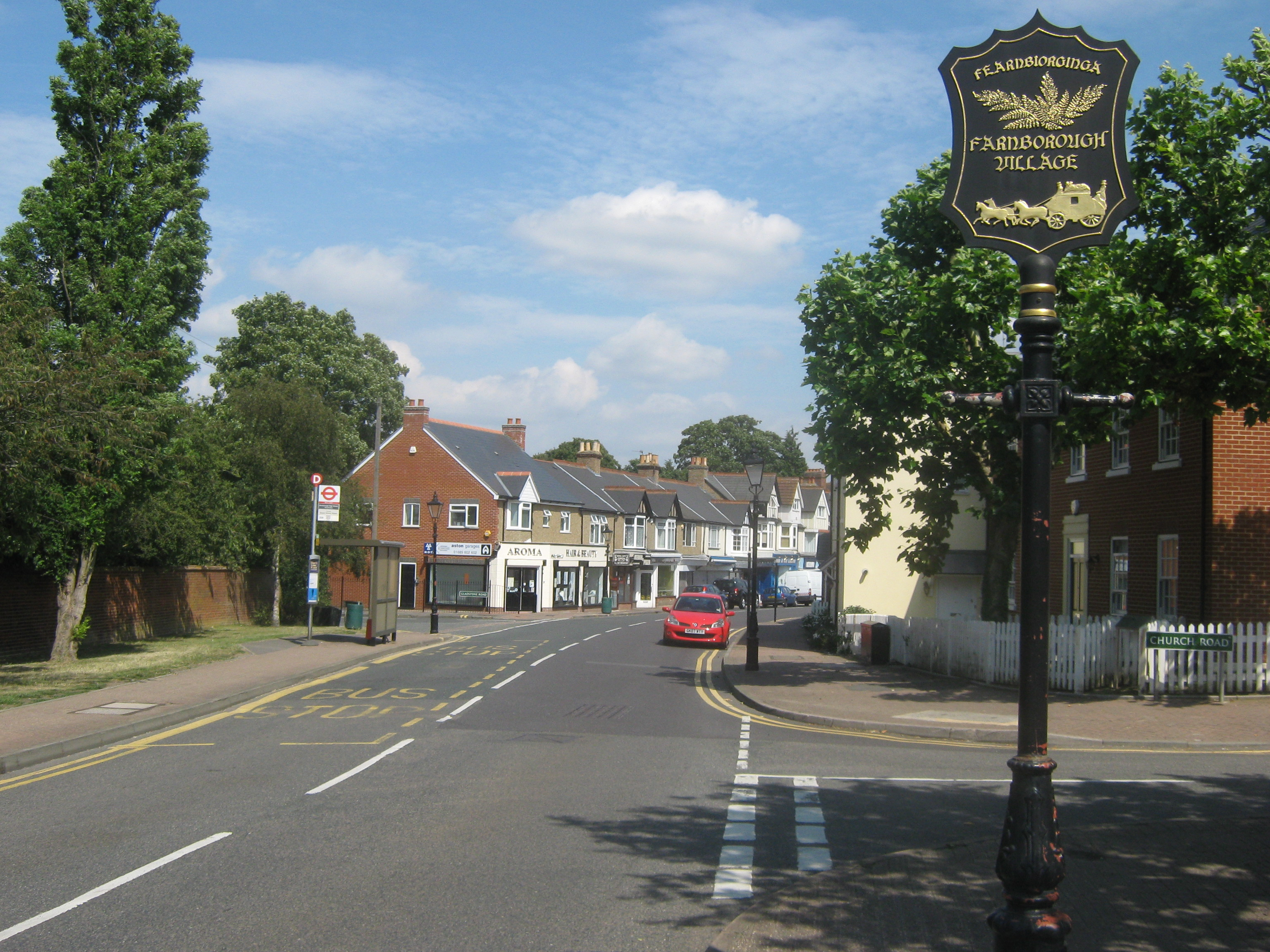
- Farnborough High Street with its village sign

- Location within Greater London
- Population: 14,632 (2011 Census. Farnborough and Crofton Ward)
- OS grid reference: TQ445645
  - Charing Cross: 13.4 mi (21.6 km) NW
- London borough: Bromley
- Ceremonial county: Greater London
- Region: London
- Country: England
- Sovereign state: United Kingdom
- Post town: Orpington
- Postcode district: BR6
- Dialling code: 01689
- Police: Metropolitan
- Fire: London
- Ambulance: London
- UK Parliament: Orpington
- London Assembly: Bexley and Bromley

Farnborough is a large village in Greater London, England. Historically within Kent, it is situated south of Locksbottom, west of Green Street Green, north of Downe and Hazelwood, and east of Keston, it is centred 13.4 miles (21.6 km) southeast of Charing Cross.

Suburban development following the Second World War resulted in the area becoming almost contiguous with the Greater London conurbation, but the village is still surrounded by open farmland. The area has formed part of the London Borough of Bromley local authority district since the formation of the ceremonial county of Greater London in 1965.

== History ==
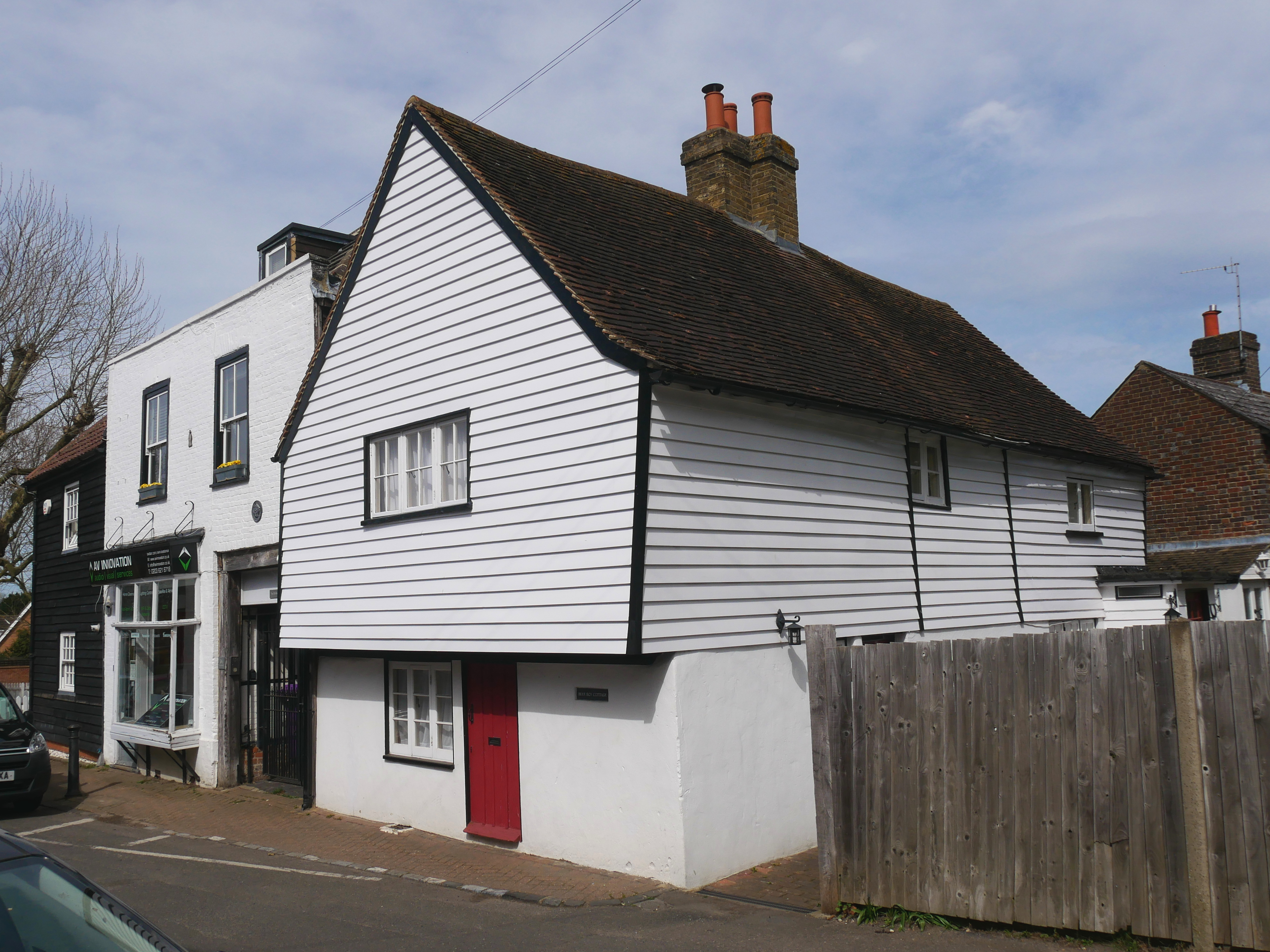
The early 18th-century house at Number 5 Church Road, now Grade II listed

The village name derives from Fearnbiorginga, meaning a village among the ferns on the hill. Old records date from 862 when Ethelbert, King of Wessex, gave away 950 acres at Farnborough. The village was not included in the Domesday Book of 1086, but the manor existed in the Middle Ages and was held in the 13th century by Simon de Montfort.

The village evolved on the main road from London to Hastings which originally ran via Church Road and Old Hill (to the south of the village). The George pub existed in the 16th century and was used as a coaching inn. Coaches and horses were accommodated later. In 1639 a severe storm destroyed St Giles' Church –it was later rebuilt.

Suburban development occurred in the post-Second World War years, resulting in the village becoming almost contiguous with the London conurbation, however Green Belt legislation prevented any further development southwards. On 30 March 2008, a Cessna Citation jet carrying five people on board crashed into a house in the village. All five people on board died, including former racing drivers Richard Lloyd and David Leslie.

== Local government ==
Farnborough formed a civil parish in the Ruxley hundred of Kent. In 1840 the parish was included in the Metropolitan Police District. It was part of the Bromley rural sanitary district and went on to form part of the Bromley Rural District from 1894 to 1934. The parish was abolished on 1 April 1934 under a county review order, following the Local Government Act 1929, and its area was split between Bromley in the Municipal Borough of Bromley (3 acres) and Orpington in the Orpington Urban District (1,426 acres). At the 1931 census (the last before the abolition of the parish), Farnborough had a population of 4373. The entire area has formed part of the London Borough of Bromley in Greater London since 1965.

Farnborough is part of the Farnborough and Crofton ward for elections to Bromley London Borough Council.

== In film ==
On 1 May 1933, British Pathé released As Befits a Romany Queen. The subject was the funeral of Urania Boswell, wife of Levi Boswell, of Willow Walk, behind Princess Royal University Hospital, on 24 April. She was the last Queen of the Kent Gypsies (Romani People). The film lasts just under two minutes, and follows the cortège into Saint Giles the Abbott Church, where the gravestone may still be found, near to the war memorial.

== Transport ==
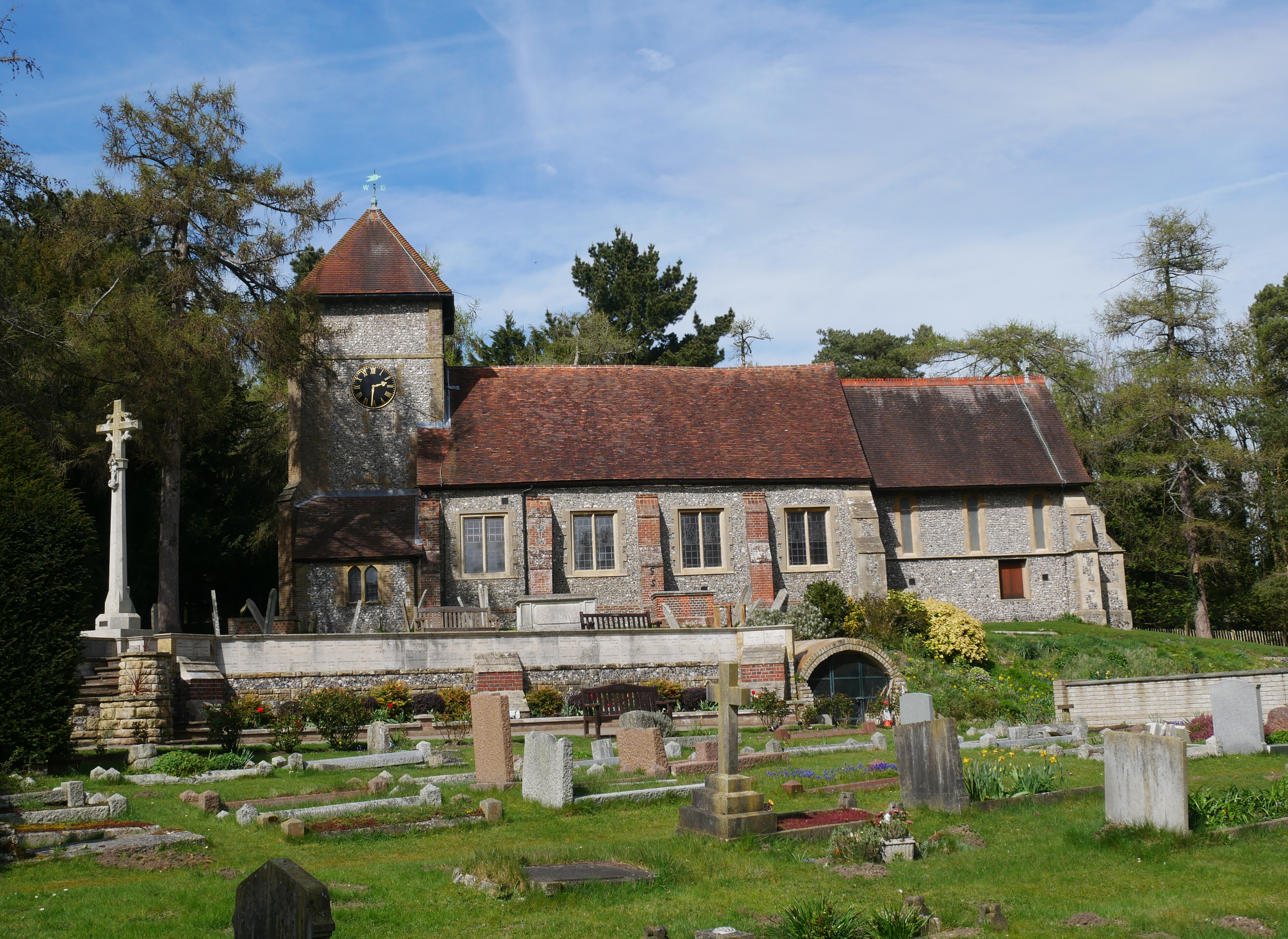
The Church of Saint Giles in Farnborough

The nearest National Rail station to Farnborough is Orpington station, located 1.7 miles (2.7 km) away.

Farnborough is served by two London Buses routes.

- 358 to Crystal Palace via Bromley, Elmers End, Beckenham & Penge or to Orpington.
- R4 to Locksbottom or to Paul's Cray Hill via Orpington & St Mary Cray.

== Population ==
Population of Farnborough parish
Year	Population
1801	314
1811	452
1821	553
1831	638
1841	680
1851	920
1861	955
1871	1,086
1881	1,451
1891	1,627
1901	2,262
1911	3,210
1921	3,322
1931	4,373

== Notable residents ==
- Steve Bennett (b. 1961) – football referee, born in Farnborough
- Chris Cowdrey (b. 1957) – cricketer, born in Farnborough
- Nigel Farage (b. 1964) – Reform UK leader and politician, born in Farnborough
- Melbourne Inman (1878–1951), six-time world billiards champion, spent his later years in Farnborough
- John Lubbock, 2nd Baron Avebury (1858–1929) - banker and footballer, born and died in Farnborough
- Ben Wallace (b. 1970) – Conservative politician, born in Farnborough
- Patrick Watts (b. 1955) – racing driver, born in Farnborough
