= List of Sites of Special Scientific Interest in Greater London =

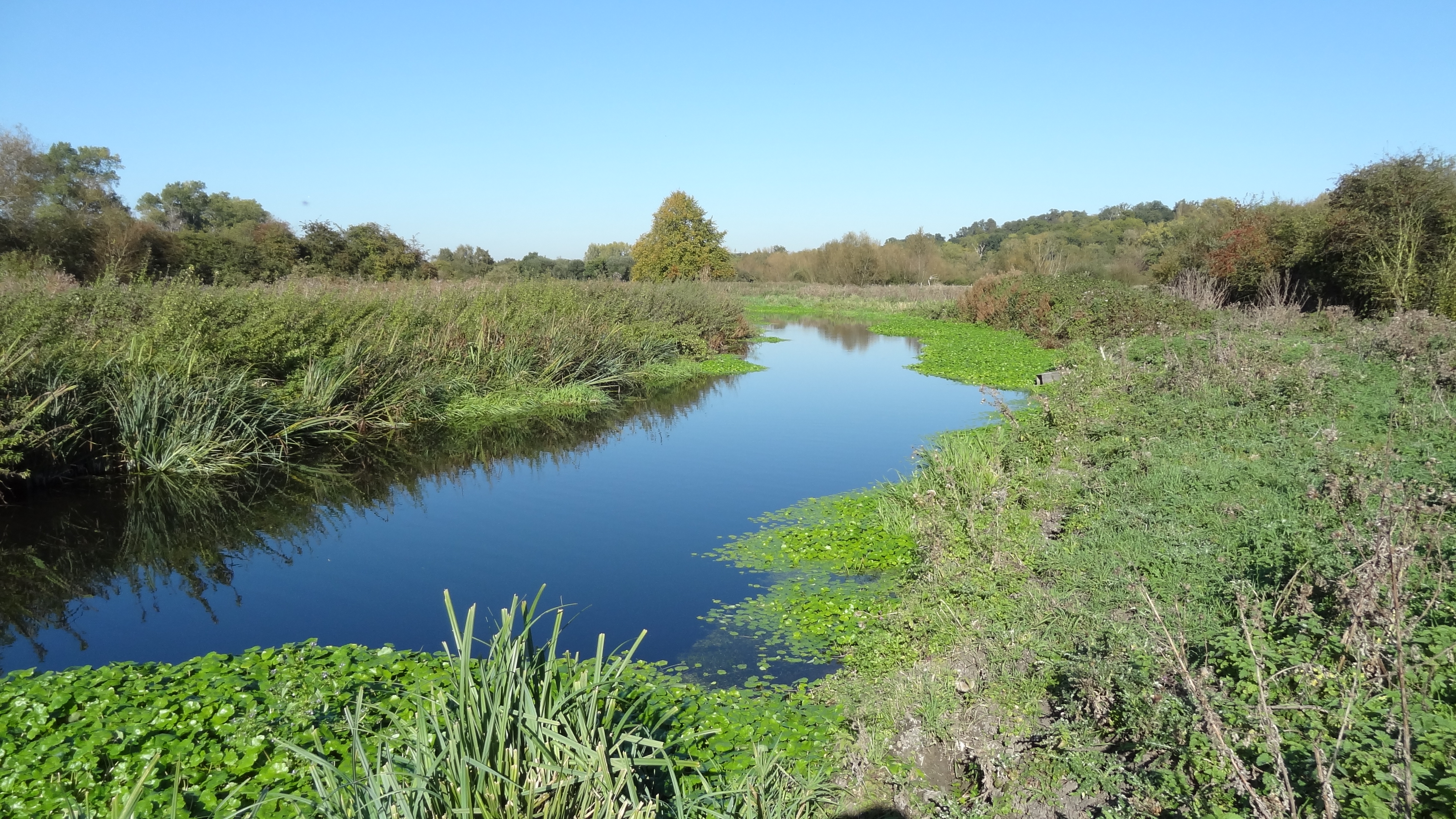
Frays River in Frays Farm Meadows

In England, Sites of Special Scientific Interest (SSSIs) are designated by Natural England, which is responsible for protecting England's natural environment. Designation as an SSSI gives legal protection to the most important wildlife and geological sites. As of August 2019, there are 37 sites designated in Greater London, 30 of which have been designated for their biological interest and 7 for their geological interest. Two sites are Special Protection Areas, three are Special Areas of Conservation, one is a Ramsar wetland site, two are national nature reserves, nine are local nature reserves, seven are Geological Conservation Review sites, one is a Nature Conservation Review site, one is on the Register of Historic Parks and Gardens and one includes a scheduled monument. Three sites are managed by the London Wildlife Trust, two by the Essex Wildlife Trust, two by the Kent Wildlife Trust, one by the Herts and Middlesex Wildlife Trust, one by the Royal Society for the Protection of Birds and one by the Wildfowl & Wetlands Trust.

Greater London is one of the largest urban areas in Europe, with an area of 1,572 km^{2} (607 sq mi). Its boundaries were set in 1965 when Greater London, which covers the 32 London boroughs and the City of London, was created. Almost two-thirds of it is green space and wetlands. Its population according to the 2011 census was 8.17 million.

== Key ==
=== Interest ===
- B = a site of biological interest
- G = a site of geological interest

=== Access ===
- Yes = free public access to all or most of the site
- PP = free public access to part of the site
- PL = public access at limited times
- No = no public access

=== Other classifications ===
- EWT = Essex Wildlife Trust
- GCR = Geological Conservation Review
- HMWT = Herts and Middlesex Wildlife Trust
- KWT = Kent Wildlife Trust
- LNR = Local nature reserve
- LWT = London Wildlife Trust
- NCR = Nature Conservation Review
- NNR = National nature reserve
- Ramsar = Ramsar site, an internationally important wetland site
- RHPG = Register of Historic Parks and Gardens
- RSPB = Royal Society for the Protection of Birds
- SAC = Special Area of Conservation
- SM = Scheduled monument
- SPA = Special Protection Area
- WWT = Wildfowl & Wetlands Trust

== Sites ==
| Site name | Photograph | B | G | Area (Note: Maps and citations for each site are taken from the Natural England database. The area and location of the site is shown on the citation.) | Public access | Location | Other classifications | Map | Citation | Description |
|---|---|---|---|---|---|---|---|---|---|---|
| Abbey Wood | | | ✓ | 6.3 hectares (16 acres) | Yes | Abbey Wood; 51.48706°N 0.12942°E; TQ481786 | GCR | Map | Citation | The site exposes rocks dating to the late Palaeocene and early Eocene 50 to 60 million years ago. It has yielded one of only two Palaeocene birds found in Britain, the holotype of Marinavis longirostris, a large Procellariiform. |
| Barn Elms Wetland Centre | | ✓ | | 29.9 hectares (74 acres) | Yes | Barnes; 51.4786°N 0.2331°W; TQ228770 | WWT | Map | Citation | The site is a mosaic of wetland areas, with open water, marshland and reed beds. It has nationally important numbers of shovelers, and other birds include gadwalls, little grebes, grey herons, mute swans and little ringed plovers. |
| Bentley Priory | | ✓ | | 55.1 hectares (136 acres) | Yes | Stanmore; 51.622°N 0.330°W; TQ156297 | LNR | Map | Citation | The dominant grasses in the site are common bent, red fescue and Yorkshire fog. Uncommon wild flowers include greater burnet, great burnet and spotted orchid. There are many birds including buzzard, spotted flycatcher, and bullfinch |
| Brent Reservoir | | ✓ | | 68.6 hectares (170 acres) | Yes | Hendon; 51.571°N 0.245°W; TQ217873 | LNR | Map | Citation | The reservoir is mainly significant for its nesting birds, especially great crested grebes. Other birds include coots, little grebes, tufted ducks and gadwalls. There are also areas of swamp and wet woodland. |
| Bushy Park and Home Park | | ✓ | | 541.0 hectares (1,337 acres) | Yes | Teddington; 51.4010°N 0.3349°W; TQ159692 | | Map | Citation | The site has nationally important dead and decaying wood invertebrates, including the beetles Aeletes atomarius, Stenichnus godarti and Trichonyx sulcicollis. It also has ancient trees and acid grassland. |
| Chingford Reservoirs | | ✓ | | 316.3 hectares (782 acres) | No | Chingford; 51.6398°N 0.0202°W; TQ371953 | | Map | Citation | The reservoirs are major wintering grounds for wildfowl, including nationally important populations of shovelers and great crested grebes. There are also important numbers of goldeneye ducks, tufted ducks and goosanders. Over 85 species of wetland birds have been recorded. |
| Crofton Woods | | ✓ | | 76.6 hectares (189 acres) | Yes | Crofton; 51.379°N 0.063°E; TQ437665 | | Map | Citation | This is a large area of ancient woodland on London Clay, which supports many species of trees, shrubs and herbs. Trees in the ancient wood are mainly oak and hazel. It has high botanical diversity, including fourteen species of sedge, and a rich invertebrate fauna. |
| Croham Hurst | | ✓ | | 33.6 hectares (83 acres) | Yes | South Croydon; 51.3509°N 0.0773°W; TQ338632 | | Map | Citation | This site, on a steep hill, has a diverse community on its lower slopes of plants dominated by oak and hazel on rich soils overlying chalk. Further up, the trees are mainly beech on Thanet Sands, and towards the top the main trees are oak and birch on the acidic Blackheath pebble beds. |
| Denham Lock Wood | | ✓ | | 6.3 hectares (16 acres) | Yes | Denham; 51.566°N 0.479°W; TQ055863 | LWT | Map | Citation | This is a poorly drained wet woodland and fen site which is skirted by the Frays River. The main trees are alder and crack willow in the wetter areas, and elsewhere oak and ash with a shrub layer of hazel. In winter there are wildfowl and in spring many flower species. Invertebrates include red cardinal beetles, banded demoiselles and the rare and protected Desmoulin's whorl snail. |
| Downe Bank and High Elms | | ✓ | | 86.8 hectares (214 acres) | Yes | Downe; 51.331°N 0.064°E; TQ438610; 51.351°N 0.075°E; TQ446625 | KWT, LNR | Map | Citation | Downe Bank is a meadow and woodland area associated with Charles Darwin, who lived locally. High Elms is woodland which has locally uncommon species, such as green hellebore, bird's-nest orchid, spurgelaurel and yellow bird's-nest. |
| Elmstead Pit | | | ✓ | 0.05 hectares (0.12 acres) | No | Elmstead; 51.4171°N 0.0453°E; TQ42327066 | GCR | Map | Citation | The pit exposes an important layer of the Oldhaven or Blackheath Beds laid down about 50 million years ago during the Eocene epoch. It has a rich and diverse selection of fossil fauna from a sub-tidal estuarine environment. Fossils include molluscs, sharks' teeth and fish scales. |
| Epping Forest | | ✓ | | 1,728.0 hectares (4,270 acres) | Yes | Epping; 51.66°N 0.05°E; TL475035 – TQ405865 | EWT, NCR SAC | Map | Citation | The forest has one of the few major examples of lowland wood pasture in England, with areas of pasture and wetland. According to Natural England it "supports a nationally outstanding assemblage of invertebrates, a major amphibian interest and an exceptional breeding bird community". |
| Farthing Downs and Happy Valley | | ✓ | | 120.5 hectares (298 acres) | Yes | Coulsdon; 51.299°N 0.132°W; TQ303572 | SM | Map | Citation | This site has chalk and neutral grasslands and an area of ancient woodland. It has the largest British colony of the rare wildflower greater yellow-rattle, and nationally scarce herbs. Eight species of orchid have been recorded. |
| Frays Farm Meadows | | ✓ | | 28.2 hectares (70 acres) | Yes | Denham; 51.5639°N 0.4765°W; TQ057861 | LWT, LNR | Map | Citation | The meadows are one of the few remaining examples of unimproved wet alluvial grassland in Greater London. Linear features such as a river, an embankment, ditches and hedges, contribute to the rich diversity of plants and animals. Mammals on site include the nationally endangered water vole. |
| Gilbert's Pit | | | ✓ | 5.2 hectares (13 acres) | Yes | Charlton; 51.4888°N 0.0418°E; TQ418786 | GCR, LNR | Map | Citation | This is an important Lower Tertiary site, displaying one of the most complete sequence of sediments in Greater London. The Paleocene Thanet and Woolwich Beds date to around 55 million years ago. Some of the beds yield many fossils of plants, sponges, molluscs, fish and reptiles. |
| Hainault Forest | | ✓ | | 136.0 hectares (336 acres) | Yes | Hainault; 51.6236°N 0.1323°E; TQ477938 | | Map | Citation | This is mainly pedunculate oak and hornbeam on Claygate Beds, glacial gravels and boulder clay. There is a varied flora and fauna, including many bird species, including nightingales, wood warblers and spotted flycatchers. |
| Hampstead Heath Woods | | ✓ | | 16.6 hectares (41 acres) | Yes | Hampstead; 51.5721°N 0.1689°W; TQ270875; 51.5676°N 0.1676°W; TQ271870 | | Map | Citation | The site has many old and over-mature trees, which provide an extensive dead wood habitat for invertebrates, including the nationally rare jewel beetle Agrilus pannonicus. The main trees are sessile oak and beech. The shrub layer is dominated by holly and rowan. |
| Harefield Pit | | | ✓ | 1.8 hectares (4.4 acres) | Yes | Harefield; 51.598°N 0.486°W; TQ049898 | GCR | Map | Citation | This is described by Natural England as an important Tertiary site in the London Basin, which displays a sequence through the Upper Chalk, Reading Beds and London Clay. It is the only known source of charophytes in the Reading Beds, and these have potential for correlation with other localities in Europe. |
| Harrow Weald | | | ✓ | 3.7 hectares (9.1 acres) | Yes | Harrow Weald; 51.6233°N 0.3447°W; TQ147929 | GCR | Map | Citation | It provides the most complete exposure of early Pleistocene gravel beds. They were formerly thought to have been of marine origin but recent research has cast doubt on this view. It is considered a key site for further studies. |
| Hornchurch Cutting | | | ✓ | 0.8 hectares (2.0 acres) | Yes | Hornchurch; 51.5636°N 0.2308°E; TQ547874 | GCR | Map | Citation | This is at the southern edge of the Anglian ice sheet 450,000 years ago, the most extreme ice age during the style="background: #FF8; color:black; vertical-align: middle; text-align: center; " class="table-maybe"|PL eistocence ice ages of the last 2.58 million years. It is the type site for Hornchurch Till, boulder clay laid down by the ice sheet in the Ingrebourne Valley. |
| Ingrebourne Marshes | | ✓ | | 74.8 hectares (185 acres) | Yes | Hornchurch; 51.530°N 0.207°E; TQ532835 | EWT, LNR | Map | Citation | The site is the largest area of freshwater marsh in Greater London. It is very diverse, with large areas of reed sweet-grass, common reed swamp, wet neutral grassland and tall fen. There are two nationally rare Red Data Book species, the hoverfly Anasimyia interpuncta and the scarce emerald damselfly Lestes dryas. |
| Inner Thames Marshes | | ✓ | | 479.3 hectares (1,184 acres) | Yes | Purfleet; 51.490°N 0.225°E; TQ531800 | RSPB, LNR | Map | Citation | The site has a wide variety of breeding and wintering birds, with internationally important numbers of wintering teal. The marshes also have rare plants and invertebrates, such as the pondweed Potamogeton pusillus and the emerald damselfly. |
| Kempton Park Reservoirs | | ✓ | | 25.6 hectares (63 acres) | No | Kempton Park; 51.426°N 0.395°W; TQ118707 | LNR, Ramsar, SPA | Map | Citation | Waders that breed regularly on the site include northern lapwing, common redshank, ringed plover and little ringed plover. The first successful inland breeding in the British Isles of pied avocet was at this reservoir. Other birds recorded include smew, garganey, Temminck's stint, spotted crake and red-necked phalarope. |
| Keston And Hayes Commons | | ✓ | | 26.6 hectares (66 acres) | Yes | Keston; 51.3584°N 0.0348°E; TQ417643 | | Map | Citation | This site has both acid dry and wet neutral grassland. Heather on dry infertile soil has unusual lichens. There are also areas of valley mire, a brook and ponds. |
| Mid Colne Valley | | ✓ | | 132.0 hectares (326 acres) | Yes | Harefield; 51.593°N 0.494°W; TQ043896 | HMWT | Map | Citation | The site is important for its breeding wetland birds and overwintering water birds. Wintering birds which are present in nationally important numbers are great crested grebes, cormorants, shovelers and tufted ducks, and the number of gadwalls is internationally significant. The River Colne is important for bats, particularly Daubentons. |
| Old Park Wood | | ✓ | | 16.7 hectares (41 acres) | Yes | Harefield; 51.611°N 0.491°W; TQ046913 | HMWT | Map | Citation | The site is dissected by small valleys and has a variety of types of soil and plants. The trees are mainly oak, birch, hornbeam and ash. Golden saxifrage and marsh marigolds grow along small streams and there is a pond which is important for dragonflies and invertebrates. |
| Oxleas Woodlands | | ✓ | | 72.7 hectares (180 acres) | Yes | Eltham; 51.467°N 0.066°E; TQ442760 | LNR | Map | Citation | The site is mature woodland on London Clay. Most of it is hazel with pedunculate or sessile oak, or birch and pedunculate oak. Insects include the beetles Oligota flavicormis and Scolytus intricatus, and the fly Dolichopus wahlbergi. |
| Richmond Park | | ✓ | | 856.0 hectares (2,115 acres) | Yes | Richmond; 51.44°N 0.27°W; TQ200730 | NNR, SAC, RHPG | Map | Citation | The park is an important refuge for wildlife, including woodpeckers, squirrels, rabbits, snakes, frogs, toads, stag beetles and many other insects plus numerous ancient trees and varieties of fungi. It is particularly notable for its rare beetles. |
| Riddlesdown | | ✓ | | 32.0 hectares (79 acres) | Yes | Kenley; 51.3236°N 0.0926°W; TQ330600 | | Map | Citation | This is the largest area of calcareous scrub in Greater London, with a herb-rich chalk grassland. There are two nationally rare herbs, early gentian (Gentianella anglica) and round-headed rampion. Invertebrate species include the scarce Roesel's bush-cricket. |
| Ruislip Woods | | ✓ | | 305.4 hectares (755 acres) | Yes | Ruislip; 51.593°N 0.431°W; TQ081892 | NNR | Map | Citation | This site has some of the largest unbroken blocks of semi-natural woodland in Greater London, almost all on clay soils, and it also has areas of wetland and grassland. It has some rare plant and insect species, including the orchid broad-leaved helleborine and the herb common cow-wheat. |
| Ruxley Gravel Pits | | ✓ | | 18.7 hectares (46 acres) | No | Orpington; 51.410°N 0.117°E; TQ474700 | KWT | Map | Citation | There are four water filled pits with areas of fen. Over 500 plants species have been recorded and 169 birds, out of which 53 are breeding species. There are also 23 butterfly species, 23 dragonfly and over 500 beetles. Water quality is high. |
| Saltbox Hill | | ✓ | | 22.2 hectares (55 acres) | Yes | Biggin Hill; 51.3251°N 0.0093°E; TQ402604; TQ408607 | LWT | Map | Citation | Much of this site is chalk grassland which is rich in plants which are rare in Greater London, and it is one of only two sites in London which have the dark green fritillary butterfly. Ten species of orchid and over thirty of butterflies have been recorded. The site also has an area of woodland. |
| Syon Park | | ✓ | | 21.5 hectares (53 acres) | PL | Isleworth; 51.4761°N 0.3080°W; TQ176766 | | Map | Citation | This meadow site has reed-grasses on lower ground, with rye-grass and meadow-grass higher up. There are many small ditches, and it is used by many overwintering birds and has a number of rare invertebrate species, including uncommon flies. |
| Walthamstow Marshes | | ✓ | | 36.7 hectares (91 acres) | Yes | Walthamstow; 51.5706°N 0.0499°W; TQ352875 | | Map | Citation | The site has areas of semi-natural wetland and some of drier grassland. There are a variety of marshland breeding birds, and butterflies such as the Essex skipper. Species such as the Roesel's bush-cricket are indicators of ancient marshland. |
| Walthamstow Reservoirs | | ✓ | | 178.3 hectares (441 acres) | PL | Walthamstow; 51.5855°N 0.0514°W; TQ351892 | SPA | Map | Citation | The Walthamstow Reservoirs support the most notable variety of breeding wetland birds among all of London's drinking water reservoirs. Great crested grebe, pochard, tufted duck, coot, yellow wagtail, sedge warbler and reed warbler are all regular breeding visitors. |
| Wansunt Pit | | | ✓ | 1.9 hectares (4.7 acres) | PP | Dartford; 51.44116°N 0.17701°E; TQ514736; TQ515738 | GCR | Map | Citation | The site exposes the Dartford Heath Gravel, and the relationship of this exposure to the Swanscombe sequence and the Thames Terraces is a controversial issue in Thames Pleistocene studies. Stone tools have been found of Homo Heidelbergensis, dating from the Hoxnian Stage, an interglacial period between 424,000 and 374,000 years ago. |
| Wimbledon Common | | ✓ | | 346.5 hectares (856 acres) | Yes | Wimbledon; 51.434°N 0.236°W; TQ227720 | SAC | Map | Citation | The common has an extensive area of wet acidic heathland, and other areas of dense semi-natural woodland on clay. There are many streams and plants uncommon in the London area. Other features are bog mosses and locally important breeding birds. |

== See also ==
- List of Local Nature Reserves in Greater London
- London Wildlife Trust
