= John Ferguson McLennan =

Scottish lawyer and ethnologist (1827–1881)

- Born: 14 October 1827; Inverness, Scotland
- Died: 16 June 1881 (aged 53); Hayes Common, England
- Education: University of Aberdeen
- Scientific career
- Fields: ethnology

John Ferguson McLennan FRSE LLD (14 October 1827 – 16 June 1881), was a Scottish advocate, social anthropologist and ethnologist.

== Life ==
He was born in Inverness, the son of John McLennan, an insurance agent, and his wife, Jessie Ross. He was educated in that city, then studied law at King's College, Aberdeen, graduating M.A. in 1849. He then entered Trinity College, Cambridge, where in 1853 he obtained a Wrangler's place (first class) in the Mathematical Tripos. He left Cambridge without taking a degree there.

McLennan then spent two years in London writing for The Leader, at that time edited by George Henry Lewes, and other periodicals. He may well have attended one of the Inns of Court. During this period he knew George Eliot and William Michael Rossetti, and dabbled in verse in the Pre-Raphaelite style.

On returning to Edinburgh, he was called to the Scottish bar in January 1857. He became secretary to the Scottish Law Amendment Society, and took an active part in the agitation which led to the Court of Session Act 1868 (31 & 32 Vict. c. 100). As a man of letters, he worked with Alexander Smith. At this time he lived at 6 Northumberland Street in Edinburgh's New Town.

In 1870 McLennan's first wife died, and he moved back to London. In 1871, he took the post of parliamentary draughtsman for Scotland.

His health, however, was already thoroughly undermined by tuberculosis (or consumption), and while wintering in Algeria he suffered from repeated attacks of malarial fever. He died of tuberculosis on 16 June 1881 at Hayes Common, Kent.

== Publications ==
McLennan undertook the article on "Law" for the eighth edition of the Encyclopædia Britannica. It looked back to the Scottish tradition of Adam Ferguson and Adam Smith; but in it he speculated also on the custom of collusive abduction seen in classical antiquity. Via conjectural steps involving the form of polyandry as it might have evolved, he found the topic that led on to his major work. It has been suggested that McLennan was motivated by disagreement with Henry Maine, on questions of legal reform, to examine Maine's Ancient Law; McLennan wrote attacks on Maine that were not published in his own lifetime.

In 1865, McLennan published Primitive Marriage. In it he argued from symbolic and ceremonial forms of bride kidnapping (see also Types of marriage). His ideas had been partially anticipated by Johann Jakob Bachofen, writing in 1861 on matriarchy, but were independent. McLennan developed from ethnographic data a social evolutionist theory of marriage, and also of systems of kinship according to natural laws. He rejected patriarchal society as an early stage, arguing in favour of agnation as a more basic evolutionary point; he proposed an early model of social groups, a war band mainly male, practicing female infanticide and acquiring female sexual partners, with promiscuity and matrilineality salient features.

In 1866, McLennan wrote in the Fortnightly Review (April and May) an essay on Kinship in Ancient Greece, in which he proposed tests for the history of kinship claimed in Primitive Marriage. Three years later, in the Fortnightly Review for 1869–70, he developed his ideas on totemism from indications in the earlier essay.

A reprint of Primitive Marriage, with Kinship in Ancient Greece and some other essays not previously published, appeared in 1876, under the title of Studies in Ancient History; the new essays included The Divisions of the Irish Family, and On the Classificatory System of Relationship. A Paper on The Levirate and Polyandry, following up the line of his previous investigations (Fortnightly Review, 1877), was the last work he was able to publish.

McLennan also wrote a Life of Thomas Drummond (1867). The materials which he had accumulated on kinship were edited by his widow and Arthur Platt, under the title Studies in Ancient history: Second Series (1896).

He was also a partial contributor to the "Werwolf" section of the Encyclopedia Britannica, 1911 edition.

== Influence ==
McLennan's work had implications for the field of history of religion. In the study The Worship of Animals and Plants (two parts, 1869–70) McLennan suggested a connection between social structures and primitive religions; and he coined the word "totemism" for the social function of primitive religion. This concise term proved to be useful to later historians of religion, and sociologists like William Robertson Smith and Émile Durkheim (among others). The following quote by McLennan (1865) contains the basic premise for the comparative method (as used by Robertson Smith):

In the sciences of law and society, old means not old in chronology, but in the structure: that is most archaic which lies nearest to the beginning of human progress considered as a development, and that is most modern which is farthest removed from the beginning.

For Robertson Smith, McLennan's comparative method proved to be important. One of Robertson Smith's more influential essays, Animal Worship and Animal Tribes among the Arabs and in the Old Testament, directly follows MacLennan's ideas on totemism. It connected contemporary Arab nomads and ancient biblical peoples with the social function of totemism in primitive religions.

== Family ==
McLennan married twice:

1. On 23 December 1862, to Mary Bell Ramsay McCulloch, daughter of John Ramsay McCulloch, by whom he had one daughter;
2. On 20 January 1875, to Eleonor Anne Brandram, daughter of Francis Holles Brandram, J.P. for the counties of Kent and Sussex, who died in 1896.

== Sources ==
- 2007. Encyclopædia Britannica Online.
- Kippenberg, Hans G. 2002. Discovering Religious History in the Modern Age. Princeton & Oxford, Princeton University Press.
- McLennan, John F. 1970 [1865]. Primitive Marriage. An Inquiry into the Origin of the Form of Capture in Marriage Ceremonies. Chicago.
- Strenski, Ivan. 2006. Thinking About Religion. An Historical Introduction to Theories of Religion. Malden, MA., Blackwell Publishing.
