= Parks and open spaces in the London Borough of Bromley =

The London Borough of Bromley in Greater London, England has over one hundred parks and open spaces within its boundaries: some large, like Crystal Palace Park, and some small, such as recreation grounds. Some of the open spaces form part of the South East London Green Chain. As a borough in Outer London it also contains some open countryside in the form of country parks.

The main open spaces under control of the borough are:

Name	Size	Location	Notes
Betts Park	12.5 hectares (31 acres)	Anerley	Recreation ground with horticultural features and remains of the Croydon Canal
Crystal Palace Park	80 hectares (200 acres)	Crystal Palace	
Elmstead Wood	34.3 hectares (85 acres)	Elmstead	
Goddington Park	64 hectares (160 acres)	Orpington	sports and wooded areas
Harvington Sports Ground	47.25 hectares (116.8 acres)	Beckenham	woodlands and open space
Hayes Common	91.1 hectares (225 acres)	Hayes, Bromley	
High Elms Country Park	100 hectares (250 acres)	Farnborough	Local Nature Reserve and Site of Special Scientific Importance
Hoblingwell Wood	87 hectares (210 acres)	St Paul's Cray	
Jubilee Country Park	25 hectares (62 acres)	Petts Wood	Local Nature Reserve
Kelsey Park	32.25 hectares (79.7 acres)	Beckenham	ornamental pleasure ground
Keston Common	55 hectares (140 acres)	Keston	Local Nature Reserve and Site of Special Scientific Importance
Norman Park	50 hectares (120 acres)	Bromley Common	
Priory Gardens	14 hectares (35 acres)	Orpington	ornamental park
Riverside Gardens	21 hectares (52 acres)	Orpington	local open space
Scadbury Park	102 hectares (250 acres)	Chislehurst	Local Nature Reserve: 300 acres (120 ha) of countryside (pasture and woodland)

In addition there are many other open spaces privately controlled; among them are:

- North of the borough: Cator Park and many sports grounds in New Beckenham; Sundridge Park including its golf course; Camden Park, Scadbury Park and Elmstead Wood near Chislehurst;
- East of the borough: Ruxley Wood, Paul's Cray Hill Park, Hockenden Wood and Bourne Wood, all in the Green Belt area;
- West of the borough: a large open space around Bethlem Royal Hospital, including farmland and Crouch Oak Wood.
- Saltbox Hill, Site of Special Scientific Importance in Biggin Hill owned and managed by the London Wildlife Trust
