= Keston Common =

Conservation area in London, England

Coordinates: 51.3584°N 0.0348°E

- Site of Special Scientific Interest
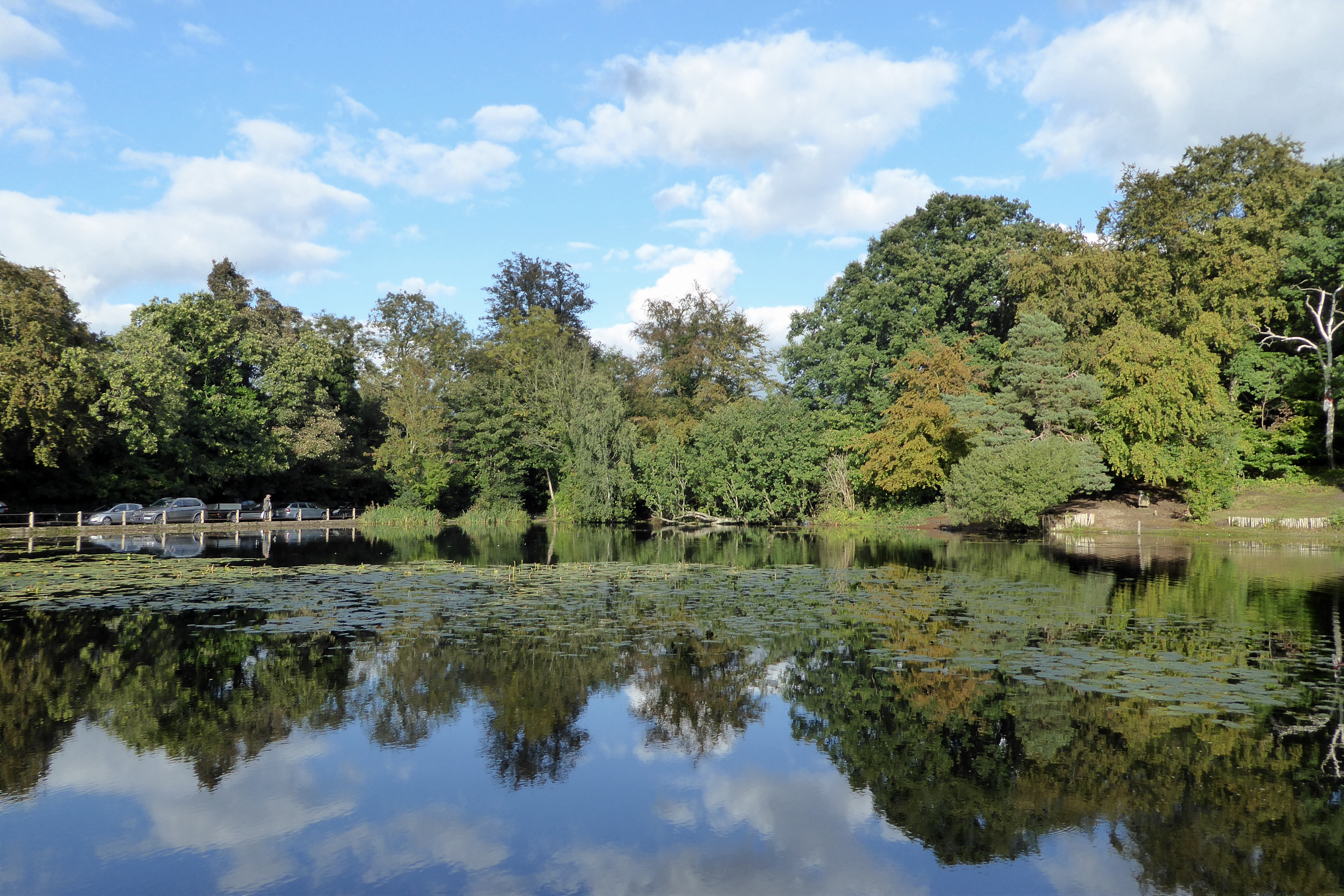
- One of the lakes that form Keston Ponds
- Location of Keston Common.
- Area of search: Greater London
- Grid reference: TQ417643
- Interest: Biological
- Area: 24.1 ha (60 acres)
- Notification date: 1987
- Location map: Magic Map

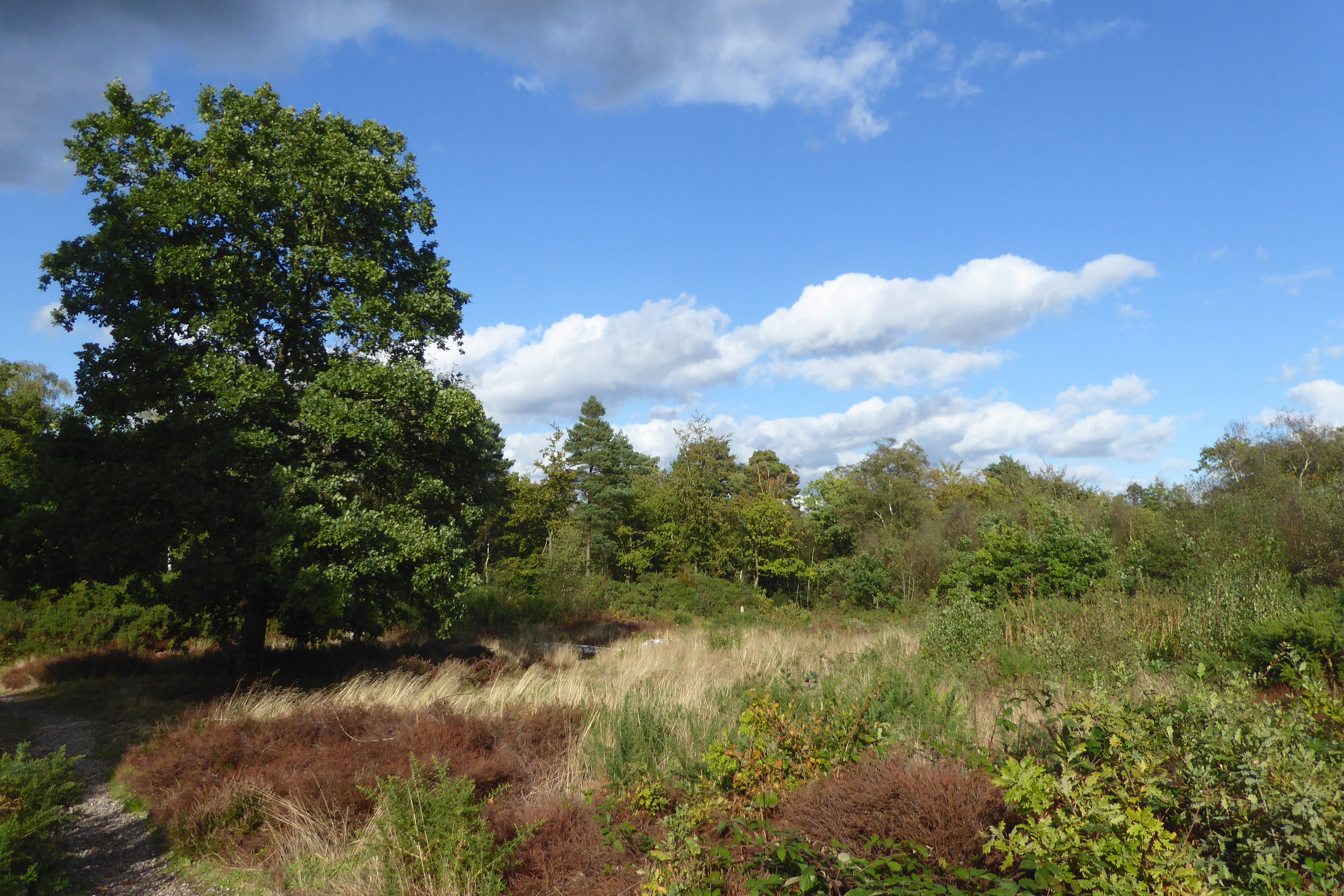
A clearing in the woodland

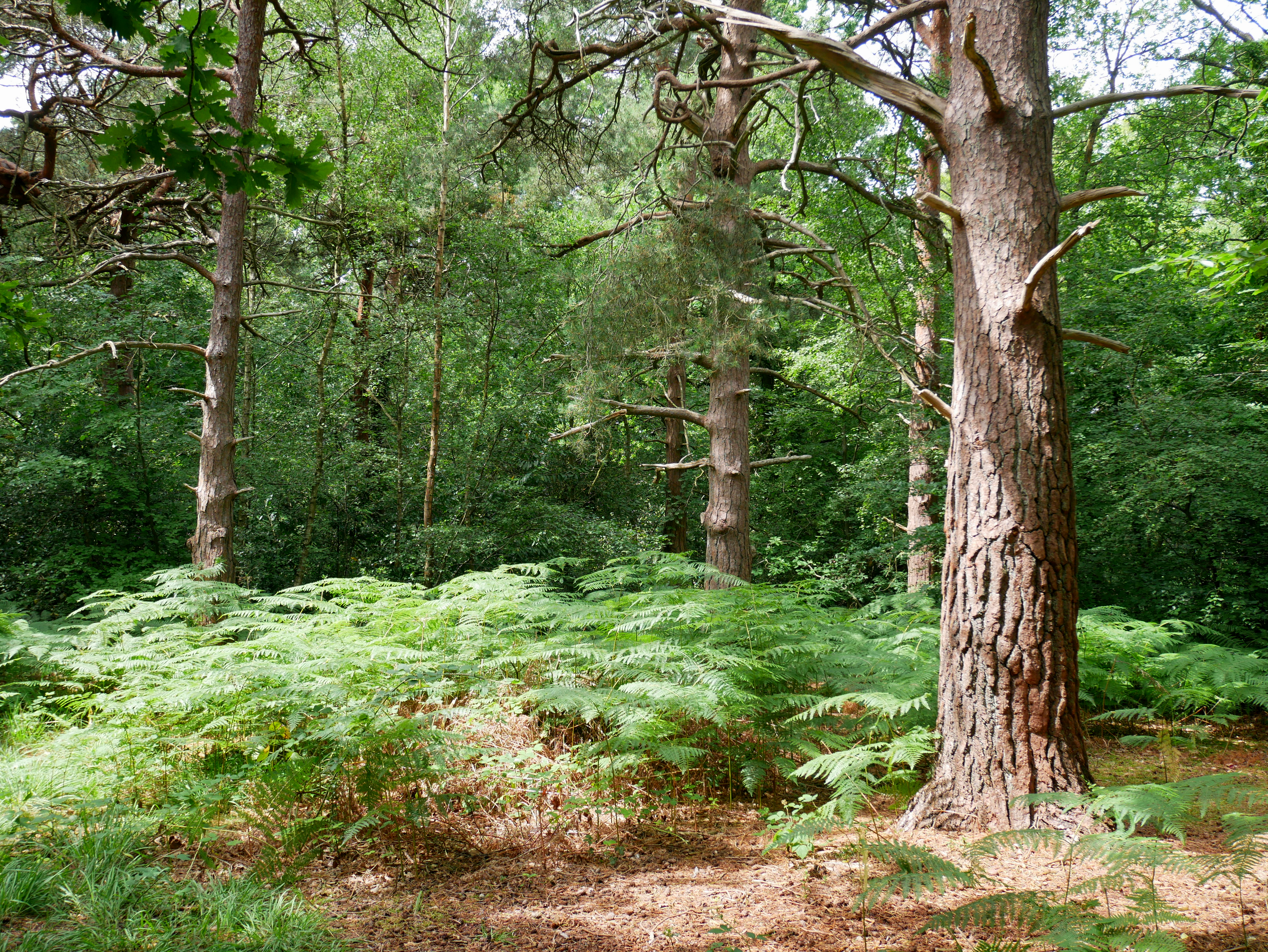
Woodland in Keston Common

Keston Common is a 55 hectare area of public open space in Keston in the London Borough of Bromley. Most of it is heathland and dry acid grassland on the Blackheath Pebble Beds. Almost all the common together with a small part of the neighbouring Hayes Common is a biological Site of Special Scientific Interest.

== History ==
The land was formerly part of the estate of Holwood House, and in the early nineteenth century three ponds were constructed to provide water to the house. It is only two miles from Charles Darwin's home, Down House, and he often visited to study the plants and animals there. It helped to provide the materials for his works on earthworms and carnivorous plants. 'Darwin's Landscape Laboratory', which included Keston Common, was the British Government's 2009 nominee for a World Heritage Site, but the application was unsuccessful. In 1926 the then owner of the common, Lord Stanley, donated it to the parish.

== Other information ==
The common is a Site of Metropolitan Importance for Nature Conservation and an Area of Archaeological Significance with earthworks which are a listed structure. Two of the ponds are now used for fishing. The Friends of Keston Common work to conserve and protect it. 21.5 hectares is registered Common Land.

== Access ==
There is access from Westerham Road, Heathfield Road and Fishponds Road.

== See also ==
- List of Sites of Special Scientific Interest in Greater London
- Parks and open spaces in the London Borough of Bromley
