= Keston Windmill =

Windmill in the London Borough of Bromley, England

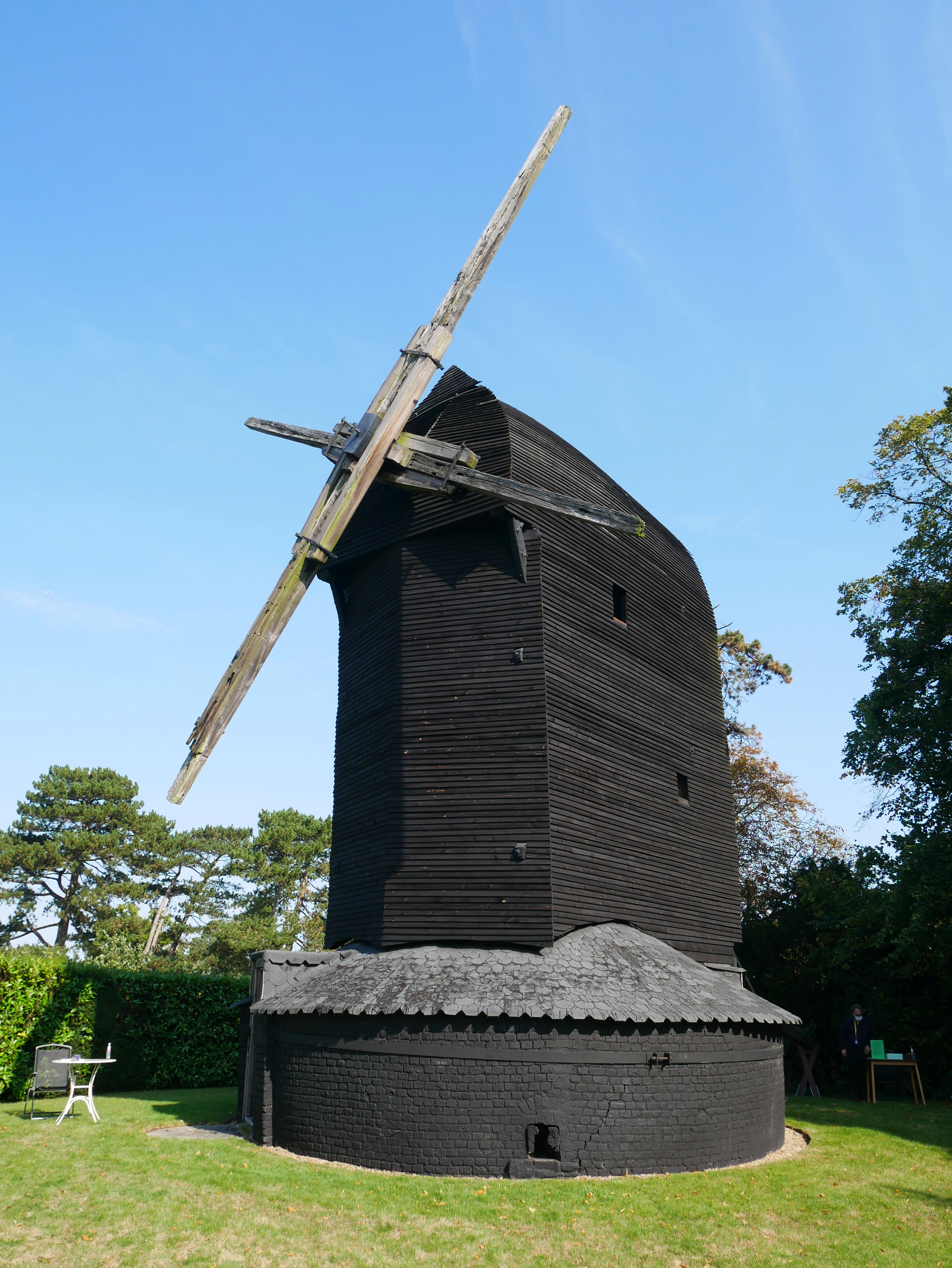
- Keston Windmill in 2020

Origin
- Grid reference: TQ 415 640
- Coordinates: 51°21′28″N 0°01′54″E
- Operator: Privately owned
- Year built: 1716

Information
- Purpose: Corn milling
- Type: Post mill
- Storeys: Three storeys
- Roundhouse storeys: Single storey
- No. of sails: Four
- Type of sails: Double Patent sails
- Windshaft: cast iron
- Winding: Tailpole
- No. of pairs of millstones: Two pairs located in the breast

Keston Windmill is a grade I listed Post mill in Keston, formerly in Kent and now in the London Borough of Bromley. The mill was built in 1716 and is conserved with its machinery intact but not in working order.

== History ==
Keston Windmill was built in 1716. William Ashby, the Westerham millwright fitted new sails and repaired the breast of the mill in December 1836. The mill was working by wind until either 1878 or 1900. In 1955, Kent County Council placed a preservation order on the mill. The mill was built to grind corn into flour. The mill is privately owned and preserved with its machinery intact, but not in working order. It is not generally open to the public.

== Description ==
Keston Mill has a three-storey body on a single-storey roundhouse. The roundhouse enclosed the trestle and the date 1716 is carved on the main post. It had four double Patent sails carried on a cast-iron windshaft. The mill is winded by a tailpole. The wooden brake wheel drives a cast-iron wallower, which drives a cast-iron great spur wheel with wooden cogs. This drives two pairs of underdrift millstones in the breast of the mill. The mill also has a flour dresser (bolter). The bolter in Keston mill has been used as the model for a reconstructed bolter in Lowfield Heath Windmill, Charlwood, Surrey.

== Millers ==
- John Ellis 1838
- Thomas Ellis 1845
- Martin J Hoath 1845
- B Hoadley 1862

References for above:-
