= Keston Roman villa =

Archaeological site in London, England

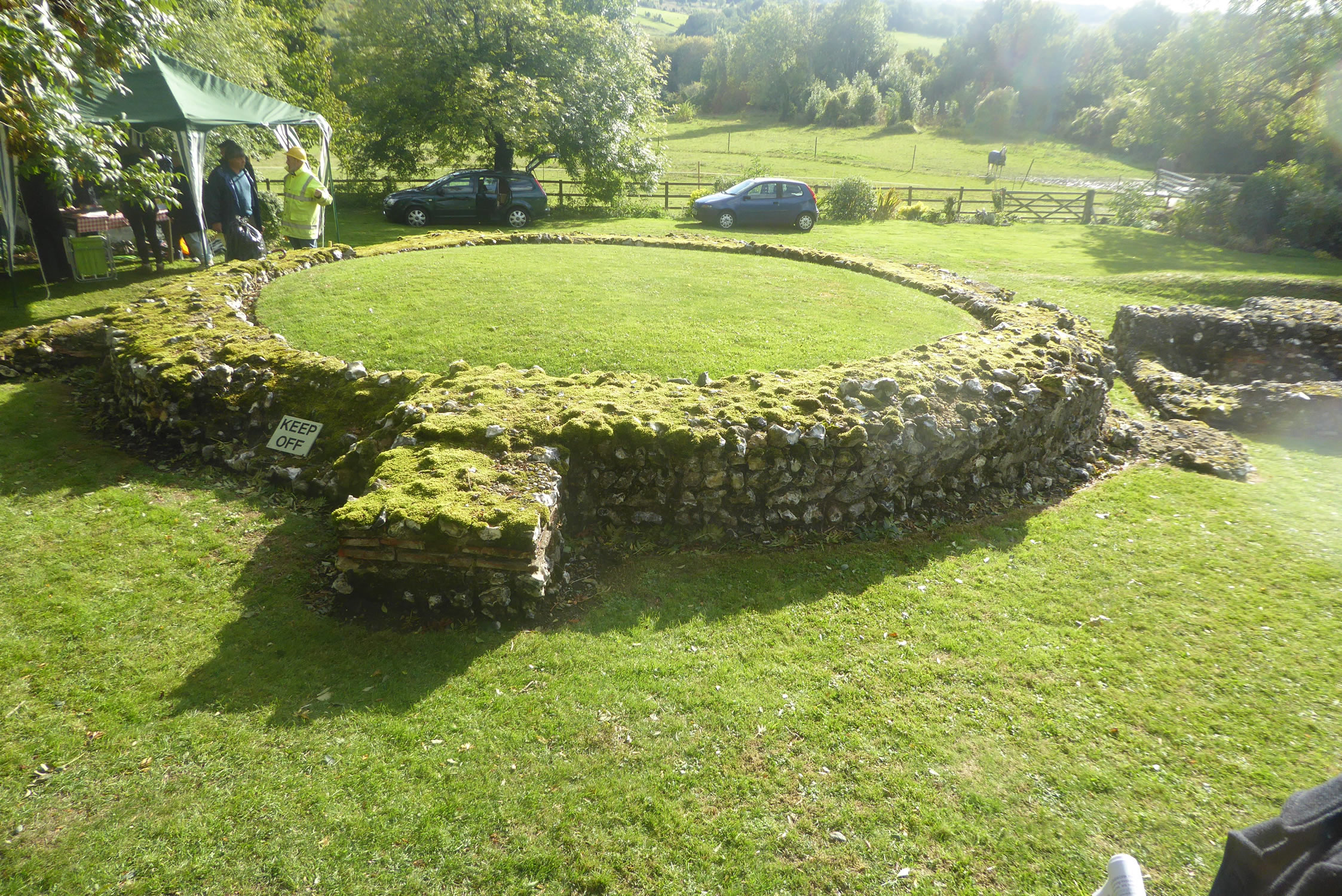
- Remains of the mausoleum

- Location within Greater London
- Location: Keston, London Borough of Bromley
- Coordinates: 51.3506679°N 0.0287962°E
- Type: Iron age village, Roman villa, Saxon village

The Keston Roman villa is an archaeological site in Keston in the London Borough of Bromley, England. The villa consisted of several buildings including a mausoleum. The latter is preserved above ground.

Excavations at the villa were carried out over the last hundred years. A sarcophagus was found by farmers around 1783. In 1828 the first proper excavations were started uncovering a round mausoleum and another sarcophagus. Another excavation in the same year uncovered the same structures and was published in detail in 1829. In 1854 was excavated the main villa building. In the following years a few smaller excavations were done. Between 1967 and 1990 the villa complex was excavated and recorded by the West Kent Border Archaeology Group. The result were published in two volumes.

Settlements remains at the site of the later villa date back to the time around 2000 BC. Mainly flint tools were found. Further settlement remains belong to the Middle Iron age. Three pits are datable to this period, containing pottery dating from about 600 to 200 BC. Postholes might also date to this phase although postholes are very hard to date and many of them might belong to a later phase of the settlement.

Further remains belong to the late Iron age, about 50 BC to AD 50. Many pits and postholes belong to this period. About ten groups of postholes can be reconstructed to small rectangular structures, that are common at other late Iron Age sites too and that are interpreted at raised granaries.

The next period of the settlement dates to the Roman period, from about AD 50 to 160. A small cemetery belongs to this period and the remains of two enclosures. The evidence is of some special importance. This is an Iron age settlement still functioning under Roman rule without major break.

Around AD 160 the first houses were constructed that might be called villas. There are three larger wooden buildings. One in the North, one in the South and the largest in the West. The latter building was once about 16 to 6 m large and was most likely the main residence of the villa complex. Plaster fragments show that some rooms were painted. The building burned down around AD 160.

Around AD 200 the main building on the west was rebuilt in stone. The new house had a bath and parts of the floors were covered with tesserae. At least some rooms and ceilings were painted. To the third century AD belongs a small cemetery in the North. The main building is a round mausoleum that was once covered with red plaster. Two smaller structures were found next to it. Three sarcophagi were found here, one of them decorated on the outside. In one of the tombs was found a small, well preserved lead coffin.

Around 300 the south building was also rebuild in stone. Its function remains unclear. The Northern building was no longer used. The western, main villa still functioned till about AD 400.

There is clear evidence for further occupation of the area after Britain was no longer under Roman rule. Remains of an early Saxon village were found, dating about AD 450–550.

"Iron Age settlement and Roman villa at Warbank, Keston" is a scheduled monument.

== Gallery ==
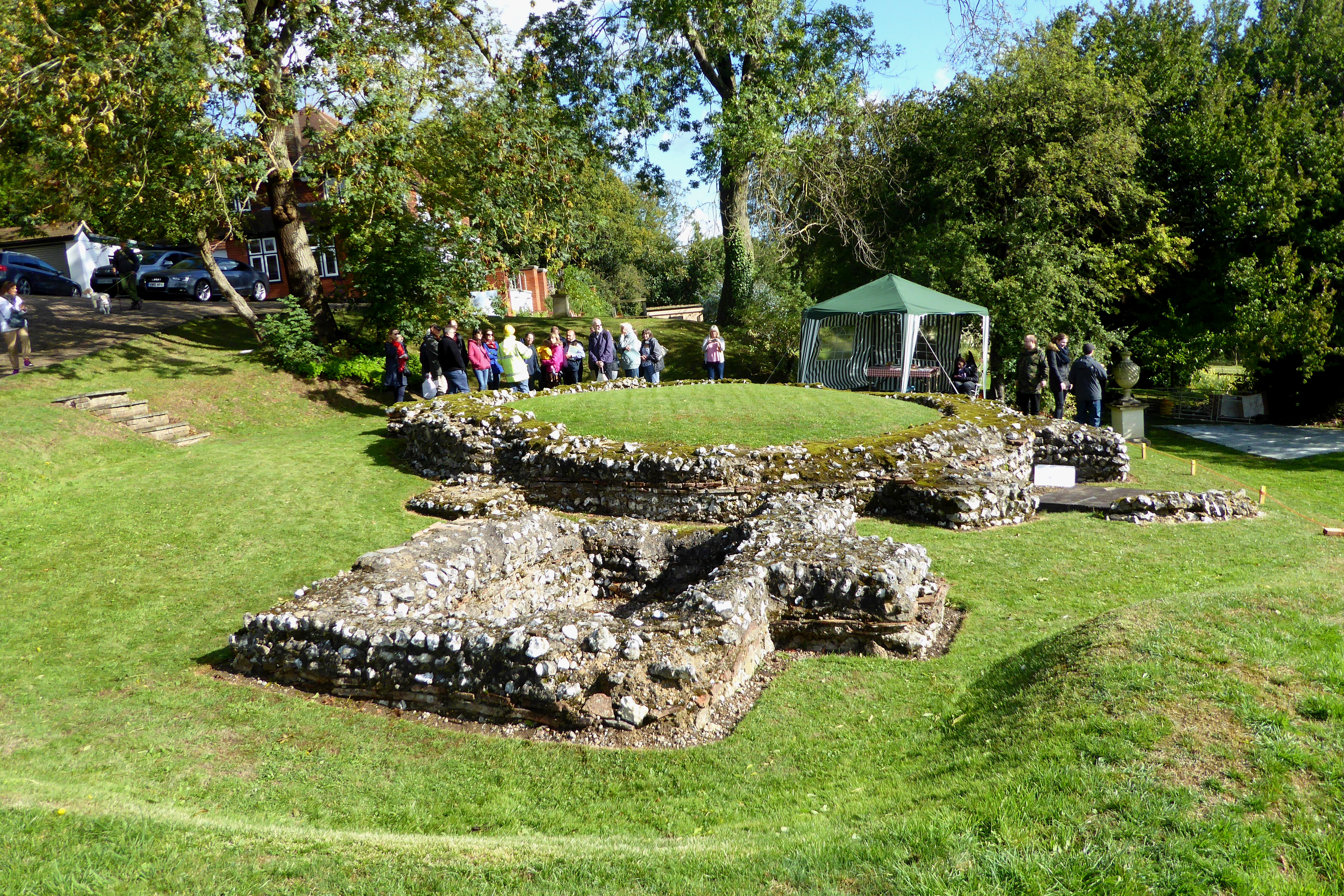
View from west

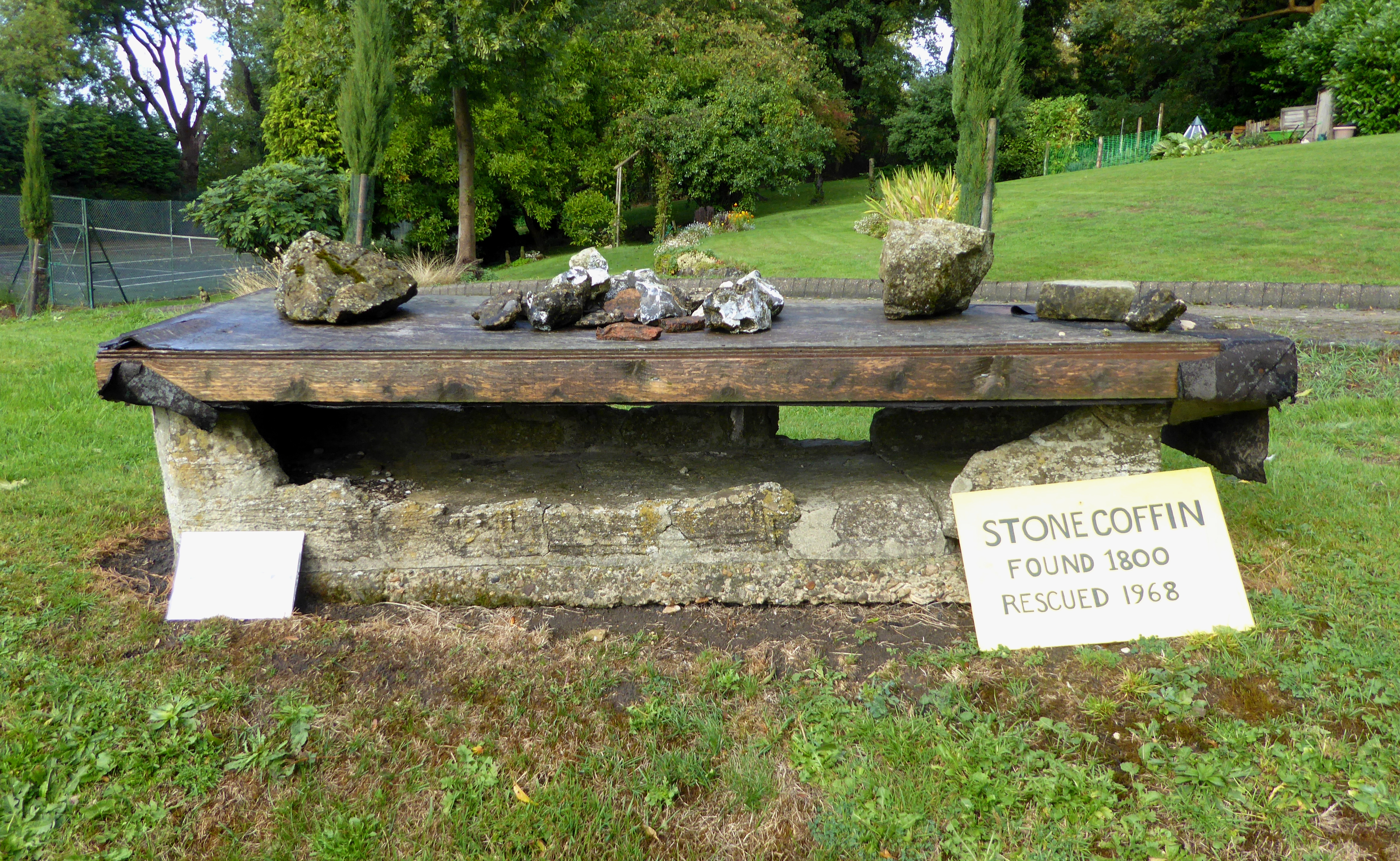
Coffin from the mausoleum

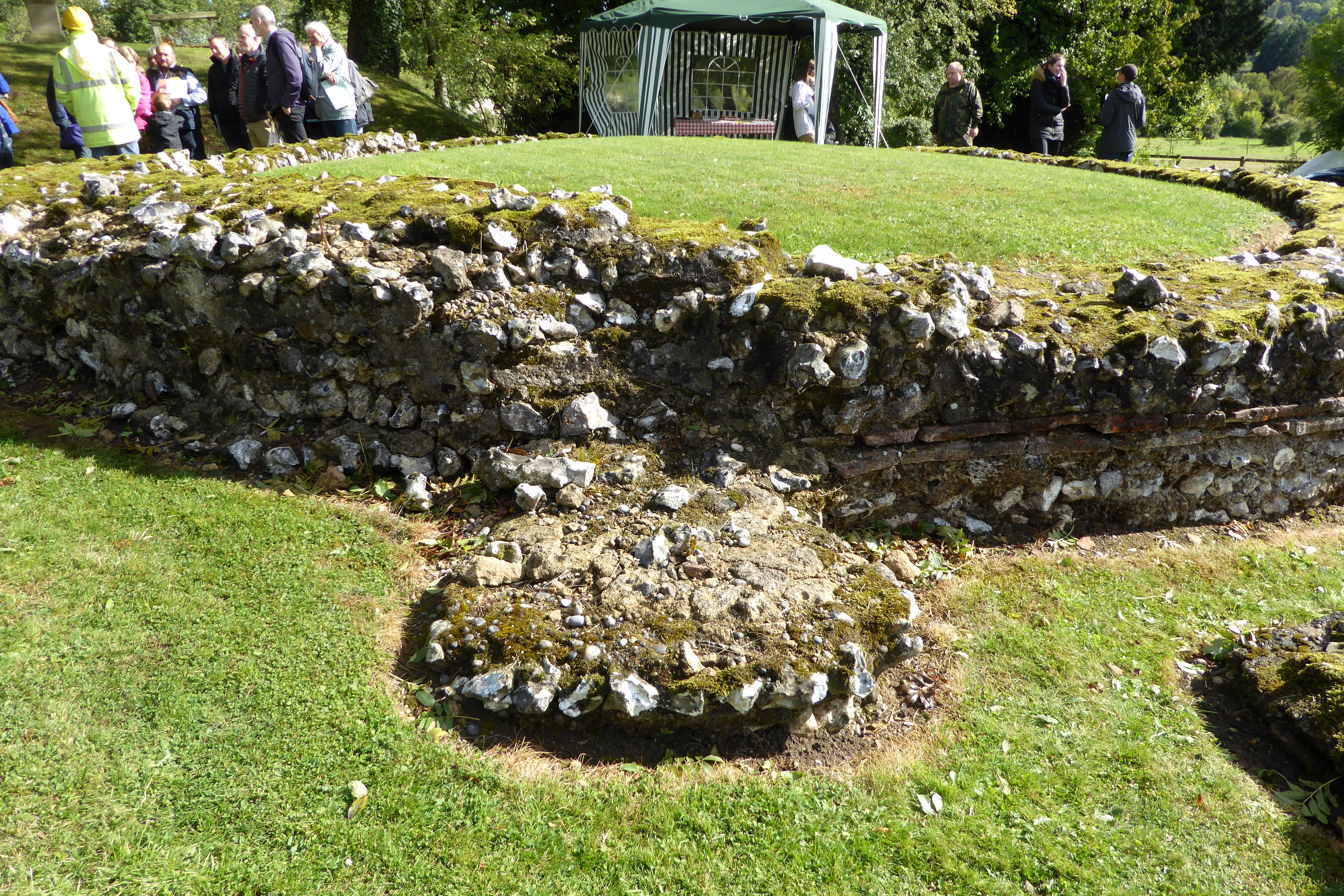
Buttress on north-west side

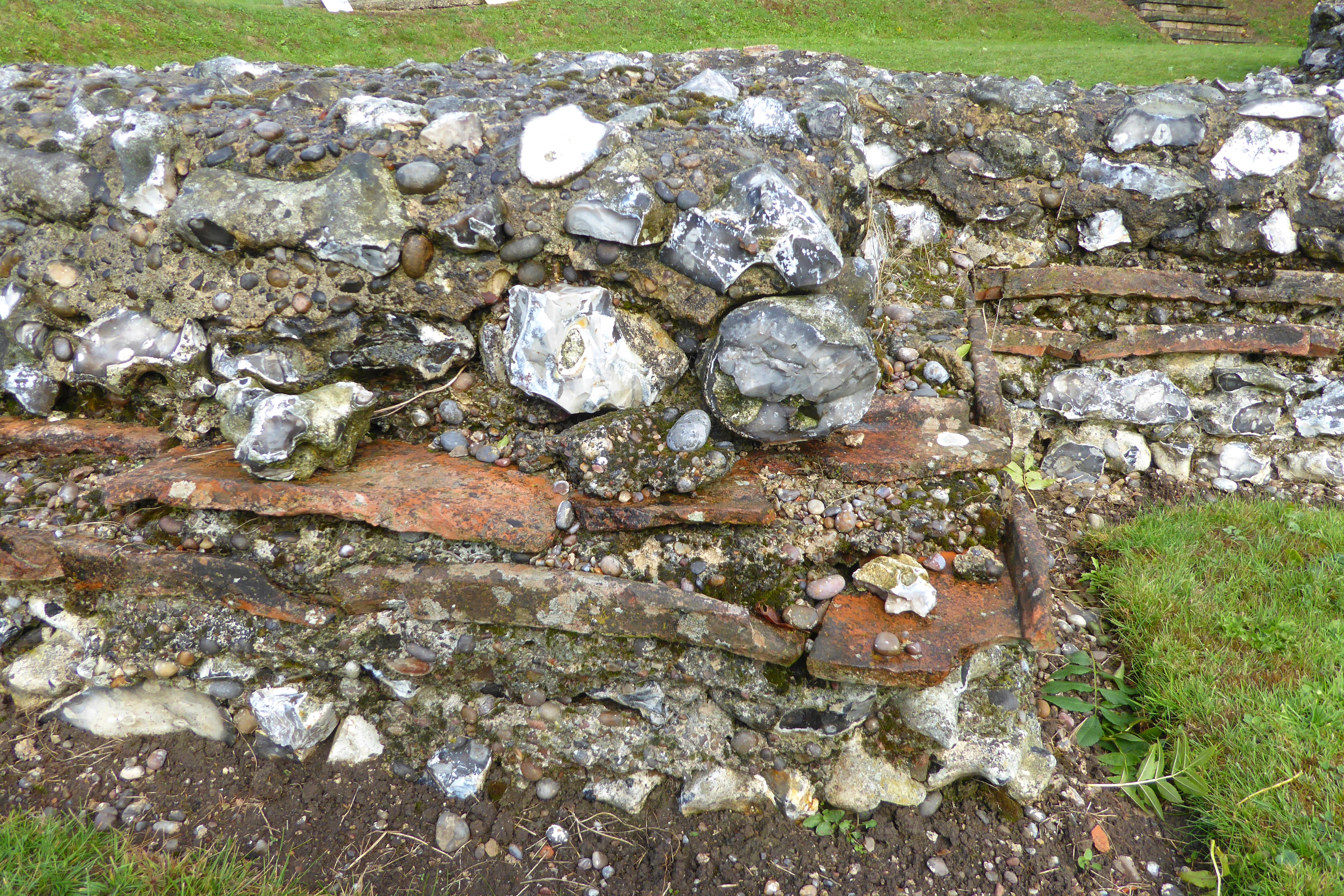
Close-up of masonry work

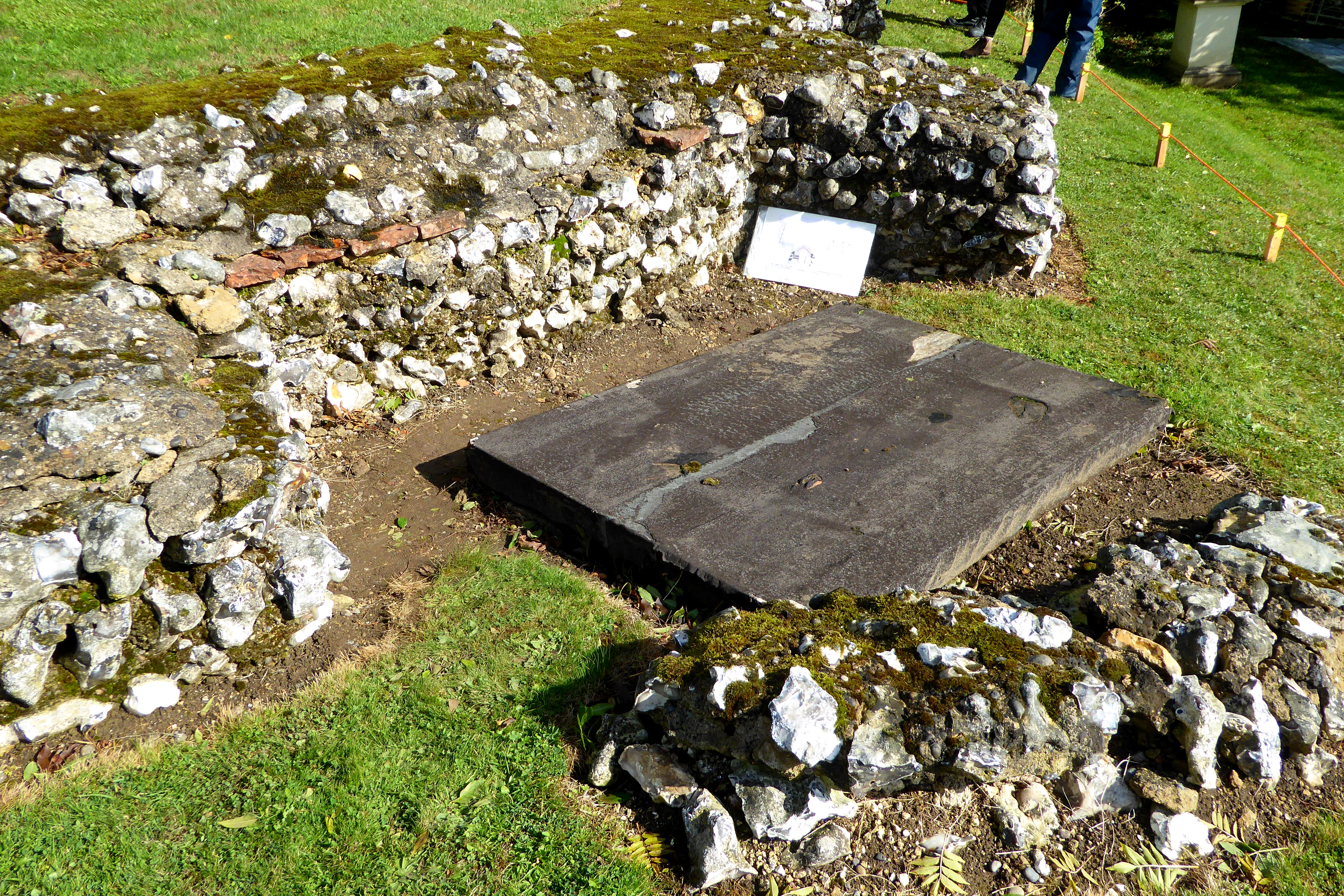
Tomb III

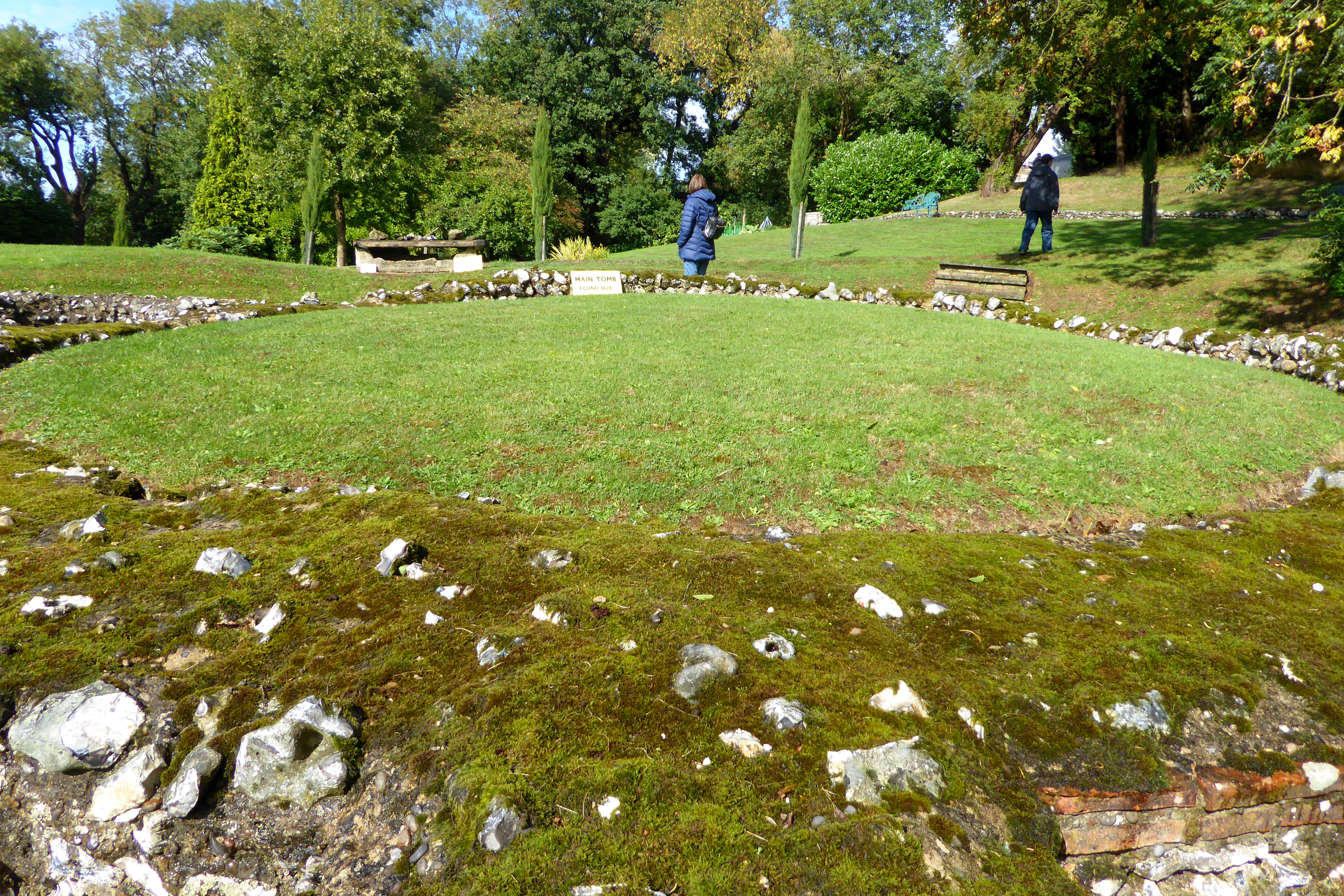
Top of Tomb I
