= Harefield Pit =

Site of Special Scientific Interest in Harefield, London

Coordinates: 51.598°N 0.486°W

- Site of Special Scientific Interest
- Location of Harefield Pit.
- Area of search: Greater London
- Grid reference: TQ049898
- Interest: Geological
- Area: 1.8 ha (4.4 acres)
- Notification date: 1990
- Location map: Magic Map

Harefield Pit is a 1.8-hectare geological Site of Special Scientific Interest in Harefield in the London Borough of Hillingdon. It occupies much of a partially filled-in chalk quarry. It has two entries in the Geological Conservation Review database.

It is an important Tertiary site in the London Basin, which displays a sequence through the Upper Chalk, Reading Beds and London Clay. It is the only known source of charophytes in the Reading Beds, and these have potential for correlation with other localities in Europe.

Natural England has cast the site as "unfavourable declining" as the Reading Beds are not visible due to covering by vegetation. It is set behind Lovett Road, without public access.

== See also ==
- List of Sites of Special Scientific Interest in Greater London
