= Saltbox Hill =

Coordinates: 51°19′31″N 0°00′34″E

- Site of Special Scientific Interest
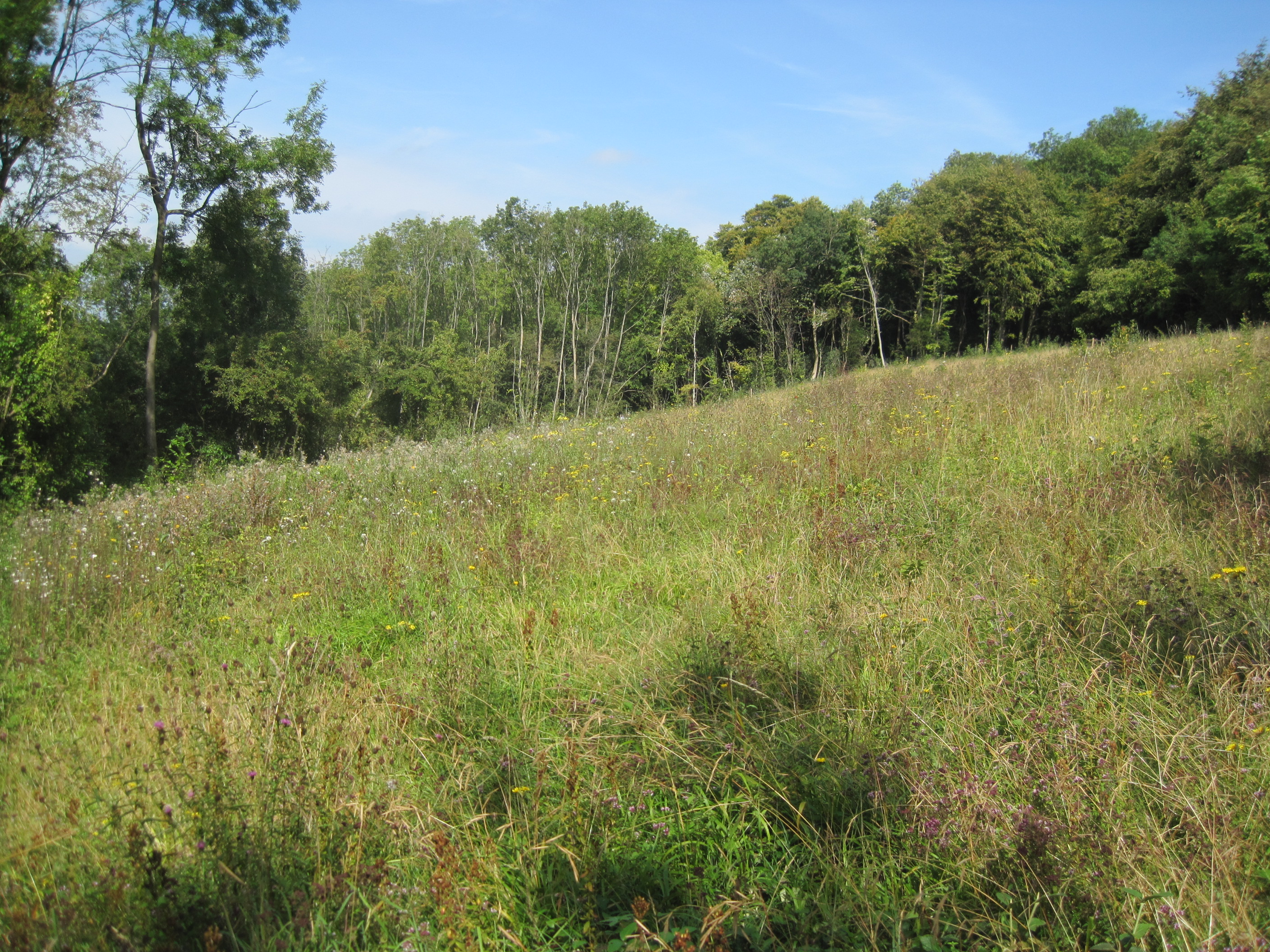
- Location of Saltbox Hill.
- Area of search: Greater London
- Grid reference: TQ402604; TQ408607
- Interest: Biological
- Area: 22.2 ha (55 acres)
- Notification date: 1985
- Location map: Magic Map

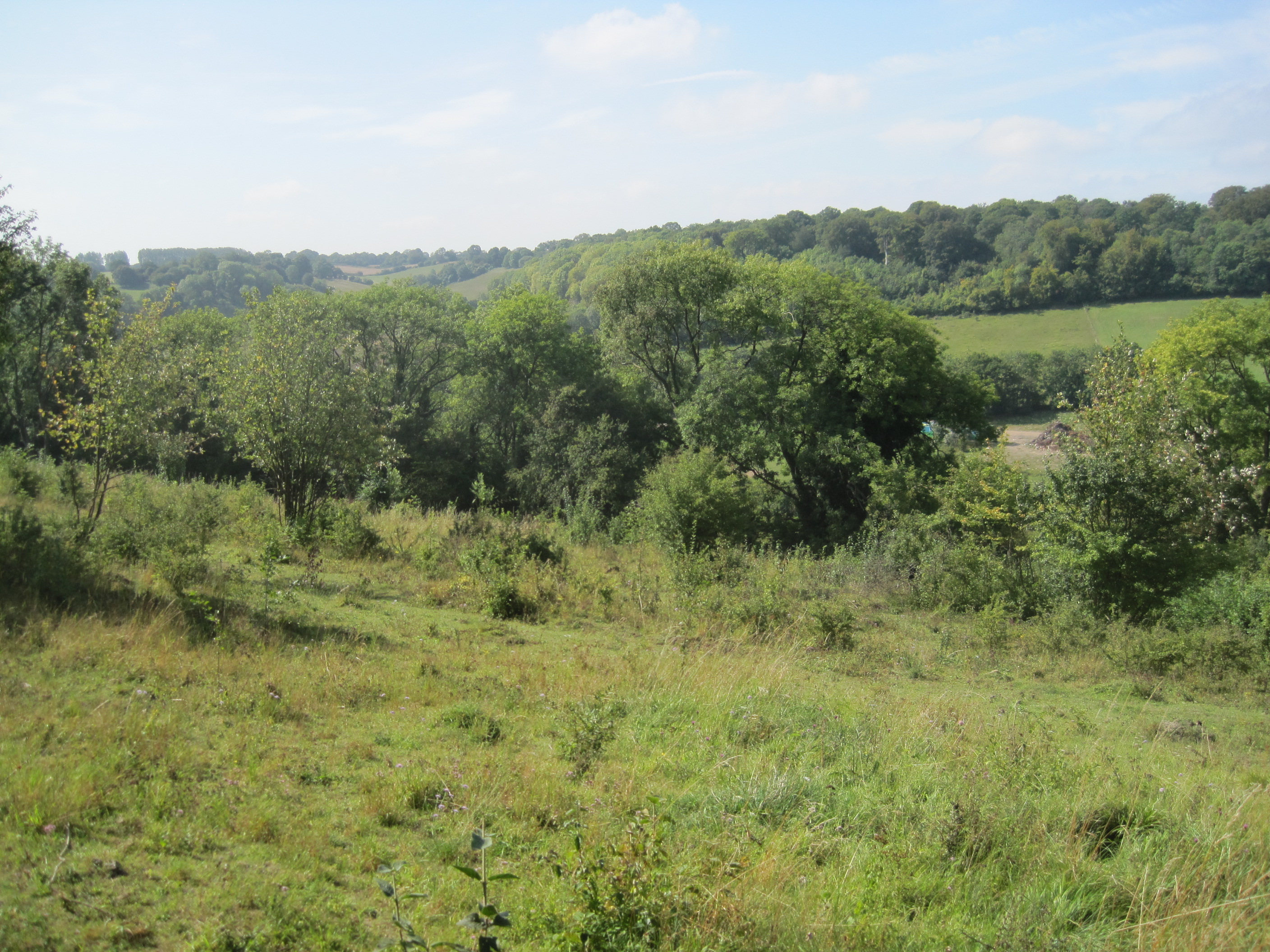
View from Saltbox Hill

Saltbox Hill is a 22.2 biological Site of Special Scientific Interest in three separate areas in Biggin Hill in the London Borough of Bromley. One area of 6.9 hectares is owned and managed by the London Wildlife Trust. It is also a Site of Metropolitan Importance. It is a steeply sloping 55 acre biological site, which is close to Charles Darwin's home, Down House, and inspired him and provided him with a picnic place.

Much of it is chalk grassland which is rich in plants which are rare in Greater London, and it is one of only two sites in London which has the dark green fritillary butterfly. Ten species of orchid and over thirty of butterflies have been recorded. The site also has an area of woodland.

The site was notified to Natural England in 1985, but by 1999 it was in danger of being lost through neglect, and the London Wildlife Trust launched an appeal to save it. The trust aimed to buy the whole site, but only succeeded in purchasing part of it amounting to seventeen acres.

There is access from Hanbury Drive and the road Saltbox Hill.

== See also ==
- List of Sites of Special Scientific Interest in London
- Bromley parks and open spaces
