= Keston =

Village in Greater London, England

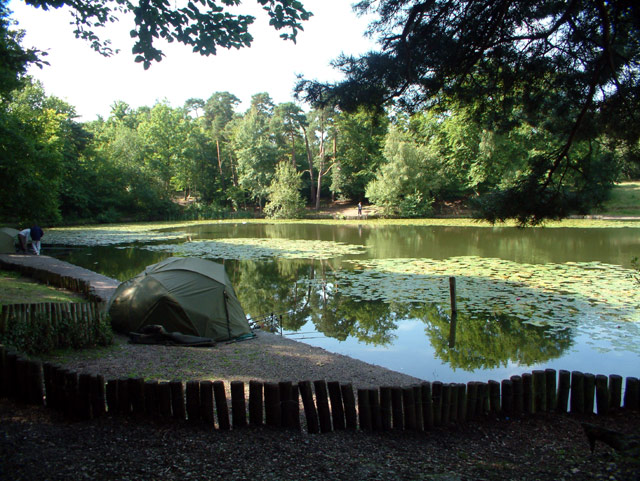
- Keston Pond

- Location within Greater London
- OS grid reference: TQ415645
- London borough: Bromley
- Ceremonial county: Greater London
- Region: London
- Country: England
- Sovereign state: United Kingdom
- Post town: KESTON
- Postcode district: BR2
- Dialling code: 01689
- Police: Metropolitan
- Fire: London
- Ambulance: London
- UK Parliament: Bromley and Biggin Hill,
- London Assembly: Bexley and Bromley

Keston is a village in Greater London, England, located within the London Borough of Bromley. Until 1965 it was within the historic county of Kent. It is part suburban, part rural in nature and lies on the edge of Hayes Common, and just beyond London's urban sprawl to the south of Bromley Common. It includes the small hamlet of Nash to the southwest. The northern, more suburban part of Keston is sometimes referred to as Keston Mark.

== History ==
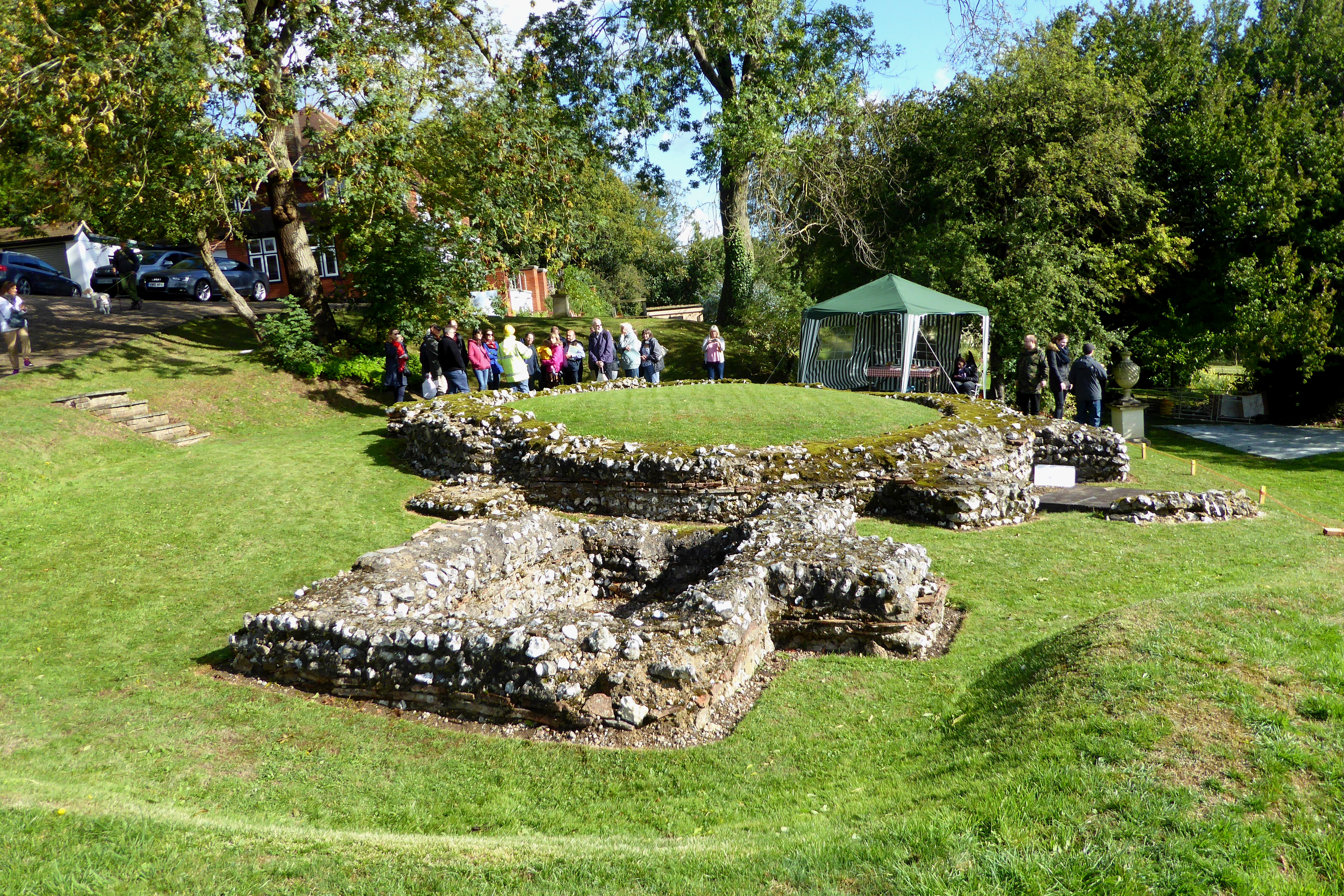
One of the tombs at the Roman Mausoleum in Keston

Flint implements and pit dwellings on Keston and Hayes Commons show occupation of the area back to at least 3000 BCE, and there are Iron Age encampments in Holwood Park and on Keston Common.

In the valley below the village are the ruins of a complex of 3rd century AD Roman tombs and mausolea (51°21′04″N 0°01′48″E) connected with the nearby 1st - 4th century AD Roman villa excavated 1967-1992 (51°21′02″N 0°01′44″E).

Sited closer to the original Keston Court than the main village itself, Keston's small medieval church is unusual in that does not have a dedication to a saint; but built into the altar-table is the top of the 17th-century altar inlaid with a very elaborate cross and inscribed "The Keston Marke: IN HOC SIGNO VINCES", so the parish has a distinctive symbol instead.

The slavery abolitionist William Wilberforce was a frequent visitor to the area as his close friend, the Prime Minister William Pitt the Younger, lived at Holwood Park. It was on top of the vale of Keston near to an oak tree that he discussed the abolition of slavery with Pitt. Only the partial dead remains of the 'Wilberforce oak' are left, but a new oak tree has been planted in its place. A stone bench, 'Wilberforce seat', commemorating the event, now marks the spot and bears the inscription from his diary "Just above a steep descent into the vale of Keston, I resolved to give notice ... in the House of Commons of my intention to bring forward the abolition of the Slave Trade."

Holwood was described in Pitt's time as "a small, neat, white building; it is more simple than elegant". Pitt engaged John Soane to enlarge the house and Humphry Repton to improve the grounds. Soane's house burnt down, and was rebuilt in 1823-6 for John Ward in a Grecian style by Decimus Burton. The new house was on a larger scale than Pitt's, in white brick and Portland stone. Later owners included Lord Chancellor Cranworth, the Earl of Derby, and Seismograph Service Ltd.

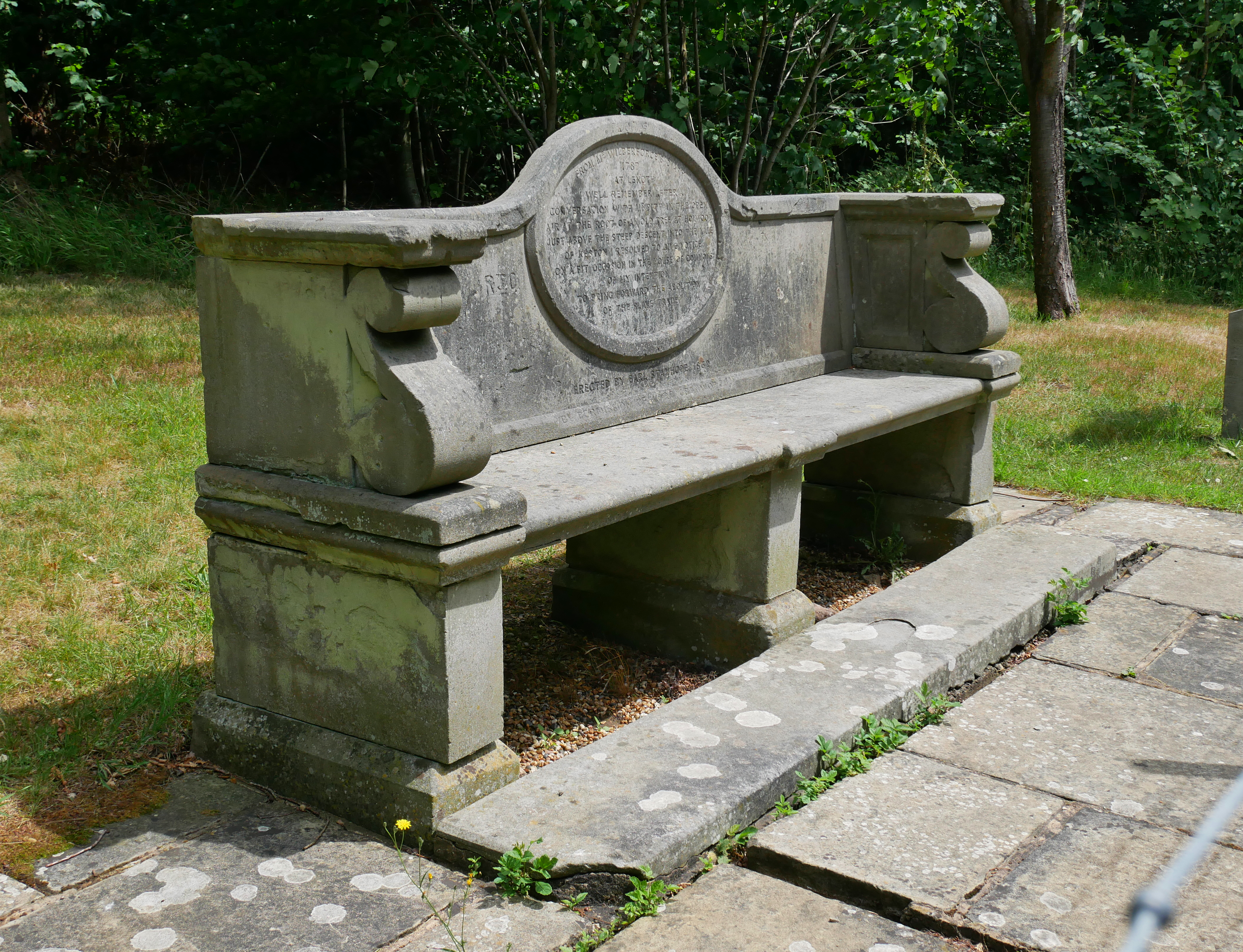
The Wilberforce Seat

The Keston Institute, now at Oxford, was so named because for some years from the early 1970s it was located (as Keston College) in the former parish school on Keston Common. Its archive is at the Keston Centre for Religion Politics and Society at Baylor University, Texas, so the parish's name has spread surprisingly far.

There was historically a small hamlet situated to the north-east of Keston village, at the junction of Croydon Road and Westerham Road/Oakley Road; it was called Keston Mark as it lay on the border ('march' or 'mark') of Keston proper. This area was more heavily developed in the 20th century, and it now effectively forms a suburban continuation of Locksbottom and Bromley Common.

On 1 April 1934 the civil parish was abolished and merged with Bromley and Orpington. At the 1931 census (the last before the abolition of the parish), Keston had a population of 1728.

== Keston Park ==
Keston Park is a gated community covering an area of approximately 140 acres (55 hectares) with approximately 200 residential properties. It is bounded by Westerham Road to the west, Croydon Road to the north and Farnborough Common to the north east. The land on which the Park stands was part of the Holwood Estate owned by the Earl of Derby.

=== History ===
When Frederick Rogers bought 143 acres (58 hectares) of land from the Earl of Derby on 9 January 1923 for £6000, it was for the purpose of developing Keston Park.

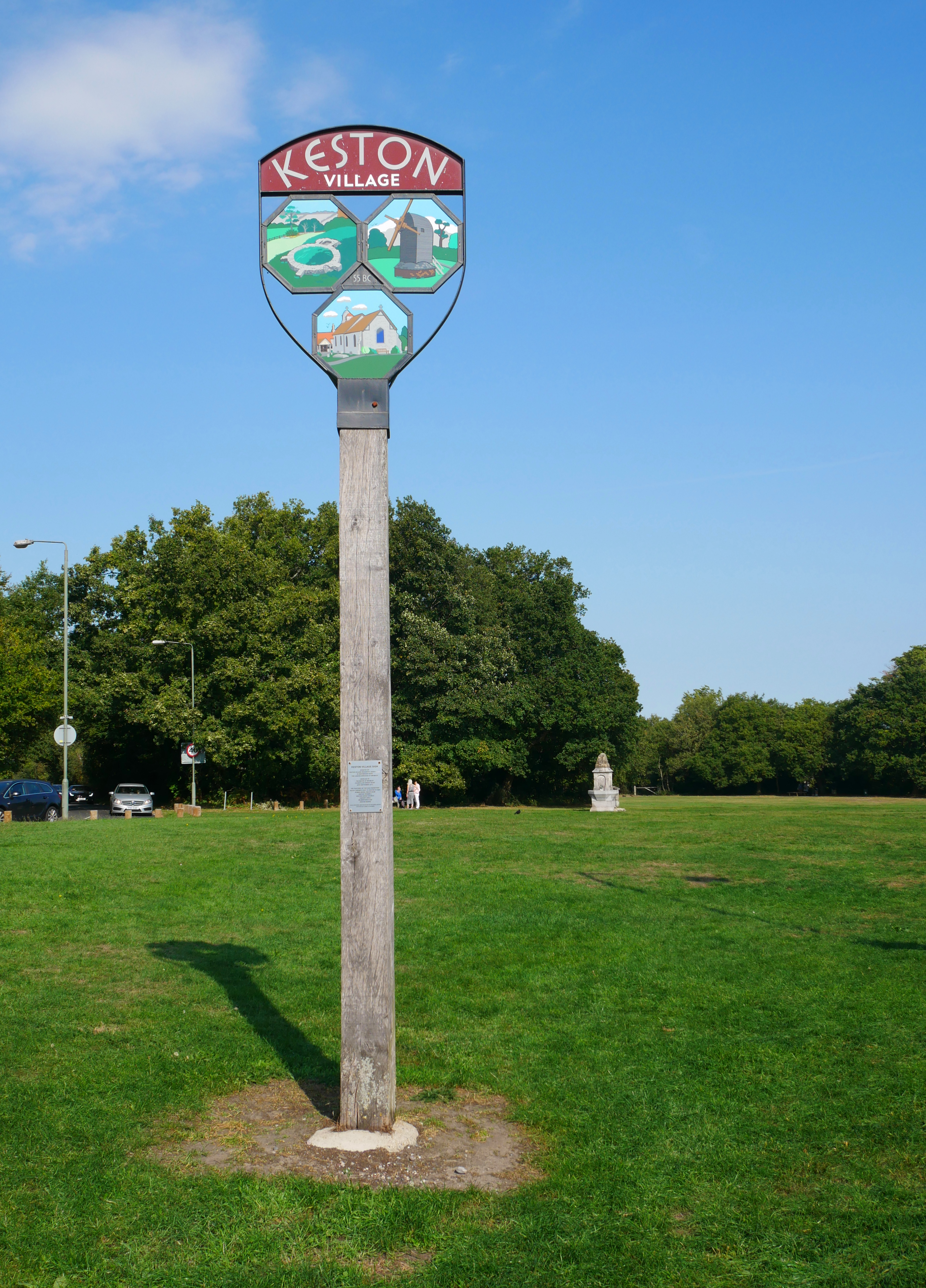
Keston village sign

The land was formerly known as the Keston Lodge Estate. Keston Lodge was the dower house to Holwood House and was occupied by Lady Ashton. It was probably regarded at the time as a separate part of the Holwood Estate and was divided from it by the public footpath which runs from Farnborough Common, almost opposite Hilda Vale Road, to Westerham Road, near to Fishponds Road.

Keston Lodge (not to be confused with a property of the same name, which stood on the opposite side of Croydon Road and is now occupied by houses in the vicinity of Cedar Crescent) later became the Keston Park Hotel. It was taken down in the 1960s. The site is now developed as Keston Park Close. The stables of the old Keston Lodge remained until the late 1970s when they too were demolished to make way for three new houses in Forest Ridge. Keston Lodge was approached through the present entrance to Forest Ridge/Forest Drive on Croydon Road. The drive ran up the line of Forest Ridge, curving back around the stables to the left to come out in front of the south side of the house. An unfenced road is shown on early maps on the line of the present Forest Drive, and this was probably the main link between Keston Lodge and Holwood House.

Holwood Park Avenue lies on the line of the north carriageway from Holwood House. According to some early maps the north carriageway was used as the principal entrance to Holwood House. There was a further access onto Croydon Road and another lodge house at Poynters Lodge near Gap House. Access is now gained to Holwood House along the west carriageway which comes out into Westerham Road at Bowens Lodge.

As well as Holwood House (built in the 1750s, Grade II listed and now called Holwood Mansion) and the old lodges, there are still some physical remains of the Keston Lodge Estate. There are also three fishponds on Keston Common, adjacent to Fishponds Road. The ponds were constructed in the early 19th century to provide a water supply to Holwood House, and are now part of popular recreational area and part of Keston Common.

Jesmond Cottage, now renamed Bushwood at 30 Forest Drive, is older than the rest of the houses on the Park. Close behind it are the walls of the old kitchen garden and greenhouses which used to serve the estate. The garden and greenhouses covered a substantial area and incorporated two ponds in the run of the stream between Forest Drive and Forest Ridge.

Further west is the old pavilion, which dates from the time when the lower part of Longdon Wood was a cricket ground.

== River Ravensbourne ==
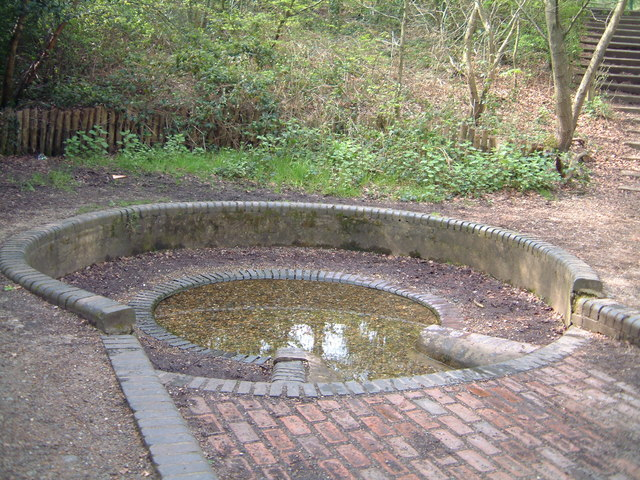
Caesar's Well, the source of the River Ravensbourne.

The River Ravensbourne rises at Caesar's Well via Keston Ponds. The Ravensbourne is 11 miles (18 kilometres) in length and flows through the London Boroughs of Bromley, Lewisham and Greenwich. Since 1991, Quaggy Waterways Action Group (QWAG) have spent millions maintaining the River Ravensbourne. The "London LOOP" walk passes the ponds on its way from Farnborough to West Wickham. Every year on 1 May at 05:32, the Ravensbourne Morris Men dance up the Beltane Sunrise at Caesar's Well, the source of the Ravensbourne River.

== Public houses ==
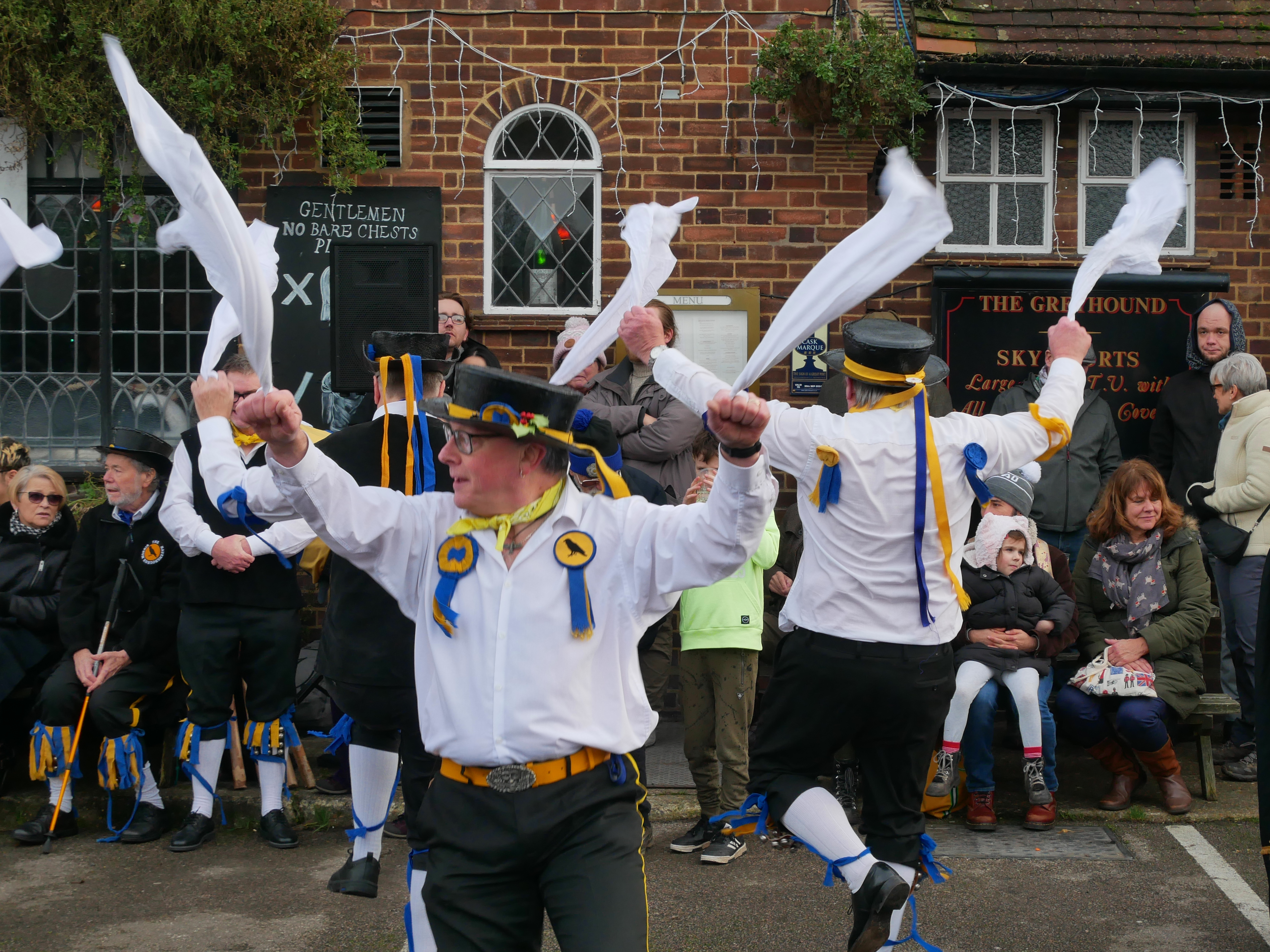
The Ravensbourne Morris Men dance outside the Greyhound pub in Keston each Boxing Day (photographed here in 2023)

Following the conversion of the Keston Mark to residential accommodation, Keston has three pubs. The Two Doves in Oakley Road lies between the village and Bromley Common, with the remaining two being in the village itself and within sight of each other; The Fox Inn on Heathfield Road and the Greyhound on Commonside. The latter is well-known locally as the venue for the Boxing Day performance of the local Morris dancing side, the Ravensbourne Morris Men who have performed there, collecting for charity, since a visit in 1963 to Keston by actor Richard Chamberlain.

== Windmills ==
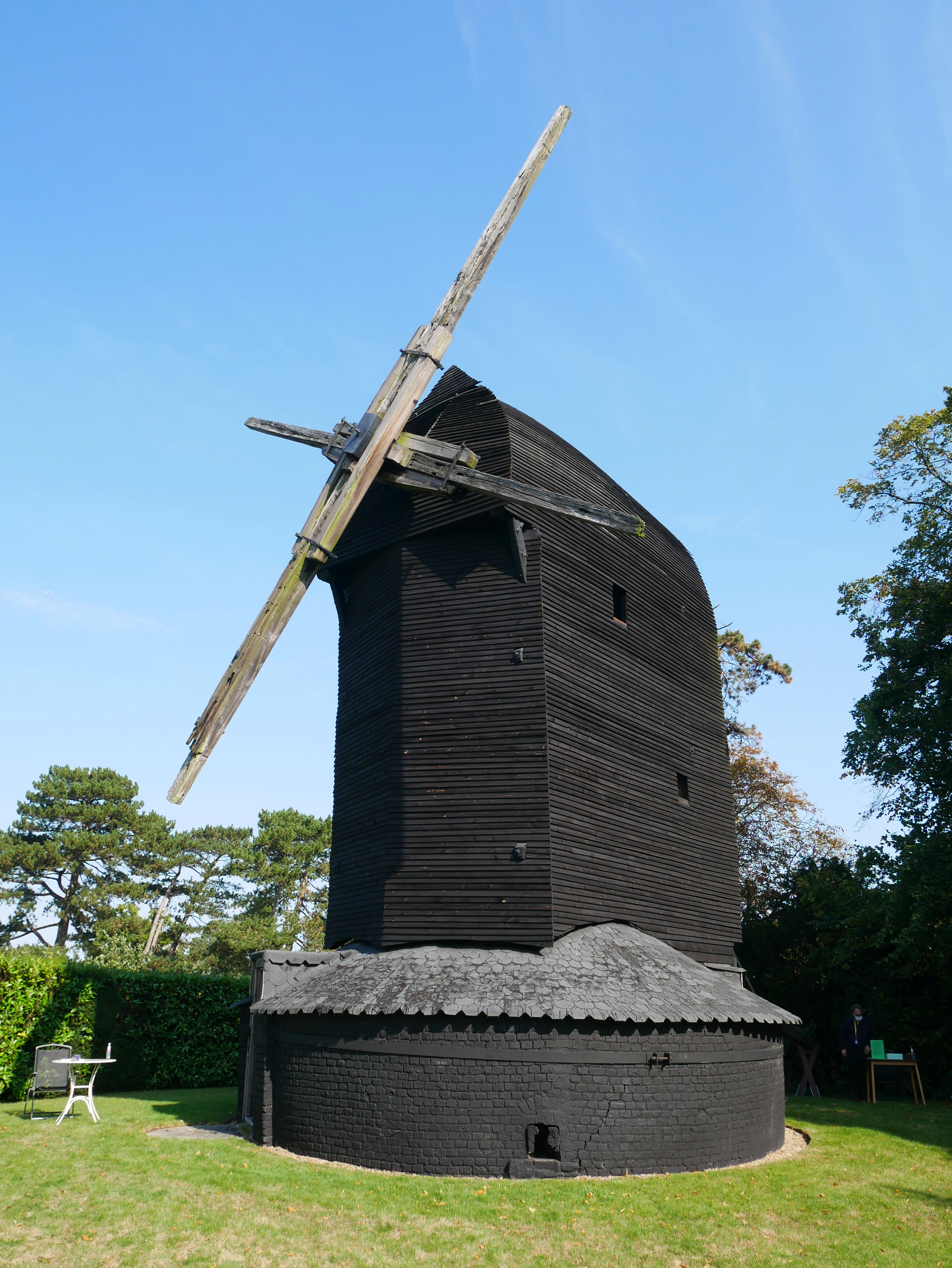
Keston Windmill

Keston has had three windmills over the centuries: Keston Windmill is a post mill built in 1716 that still stands on Keston Common; a smock mill known as Olive's Mill, built in 1824 and burnt down between 1878 and 1885; and a third mill, which stood at Holwood Park.

=== St. Audrey's ===
A small private church dedicated to St. Audrey was built by Lord Sackville Cecil, son of James Gascoyne-Cecil, 2nd Marquess of Salisbury, on the site of Olive's Mill in 1889. The church and other mill premises came into the possession of the parish in 1908, and since 1925 the former Olive's Mill House has been used as the rectory. (The former rectory, next to the parish church, was sold off as it was deemed too large, and was later bombed in the Second World War). The mill buildings were for nearly a century used as parish rooms. The church has now been secularised.

== Transport ==
=== Rail ===
The nearest railway station to Keston is Hayes, the terminus of the Hayes line, some 1 1/2 miles (2.5 kilometres) to the northwest.

=== Bus ===
Keston is in the administrative county of Greater London and the Transport for London zone. It is served by several London Buses services from London with multiple routes serving Keston Village, two stopping in the village itself and another four which stop within a ten minutes walk at Keston Mark:

- 146 – Downe to Bromley North via Keston and Old Hayes;
- 246 - Westerham to Bromley North via Biggin Hill, Keston, Coney Hall and Hayes (during the summer, this bus runs between Chartwell and Bromley North on a Sunday);
- 320 – Biggin Hill Valley to Catford Bridge via Keston Mark, Bromley and Downham;
- 664 (school journeys) - New Addington to Biggin Hill (Charles Darwin School) via Addington Village, Coney Hall, and Keston Mark;
- 684 (school journeys) - Orpington Station to Biggin Hill (Charles Darwin School) via Green Street Green, Locksbottom and Keston Mark;
- R2 - Biggin Hill Valley to Orpington via Keston Mark and Locksbottom.

== Notable residents ==
- Richard Murdoch (1907–1990), actor, born in Keston.

== Gallery ==
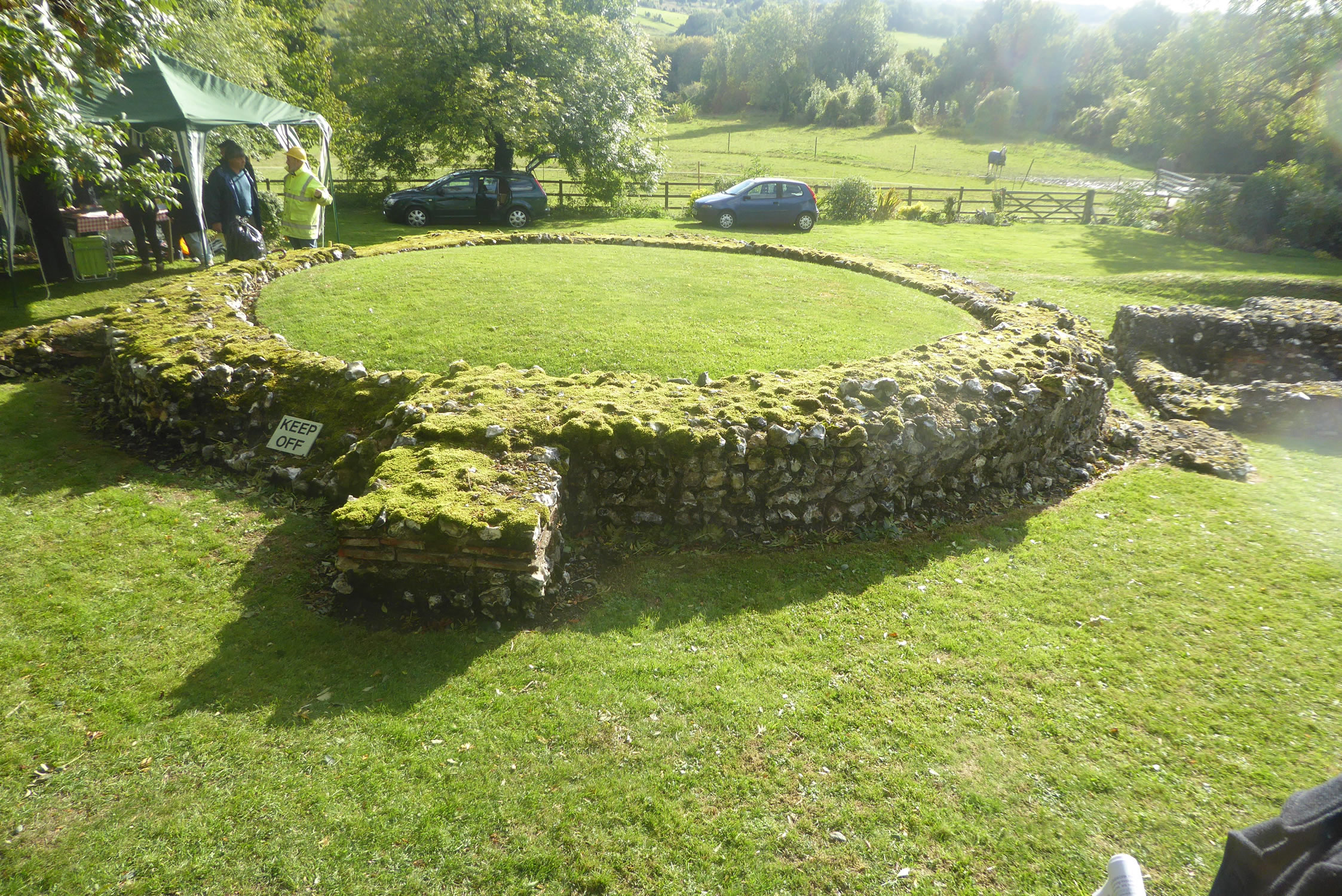
Keston Roman Mausoleum

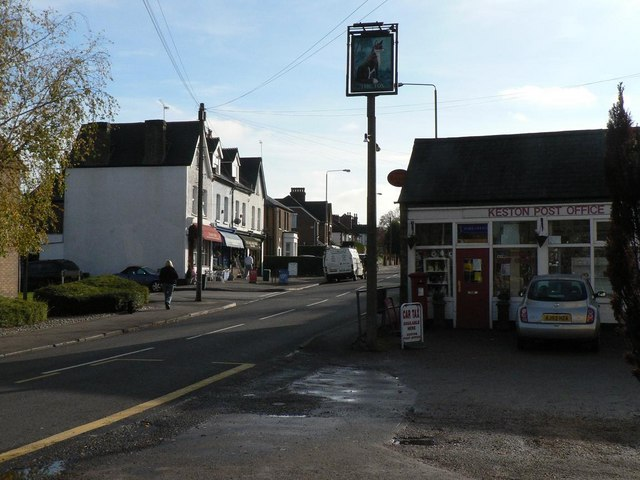
Village shops

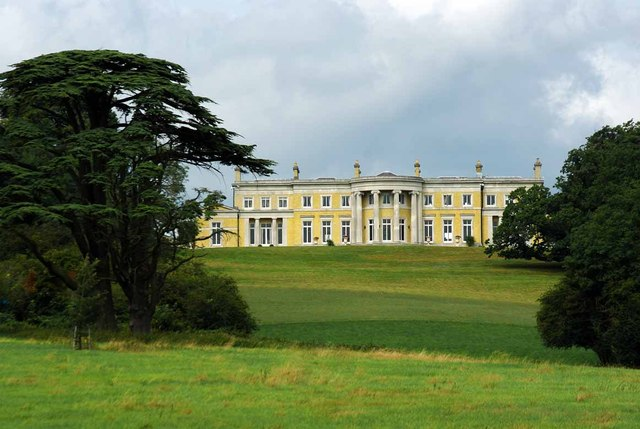
Holwood House

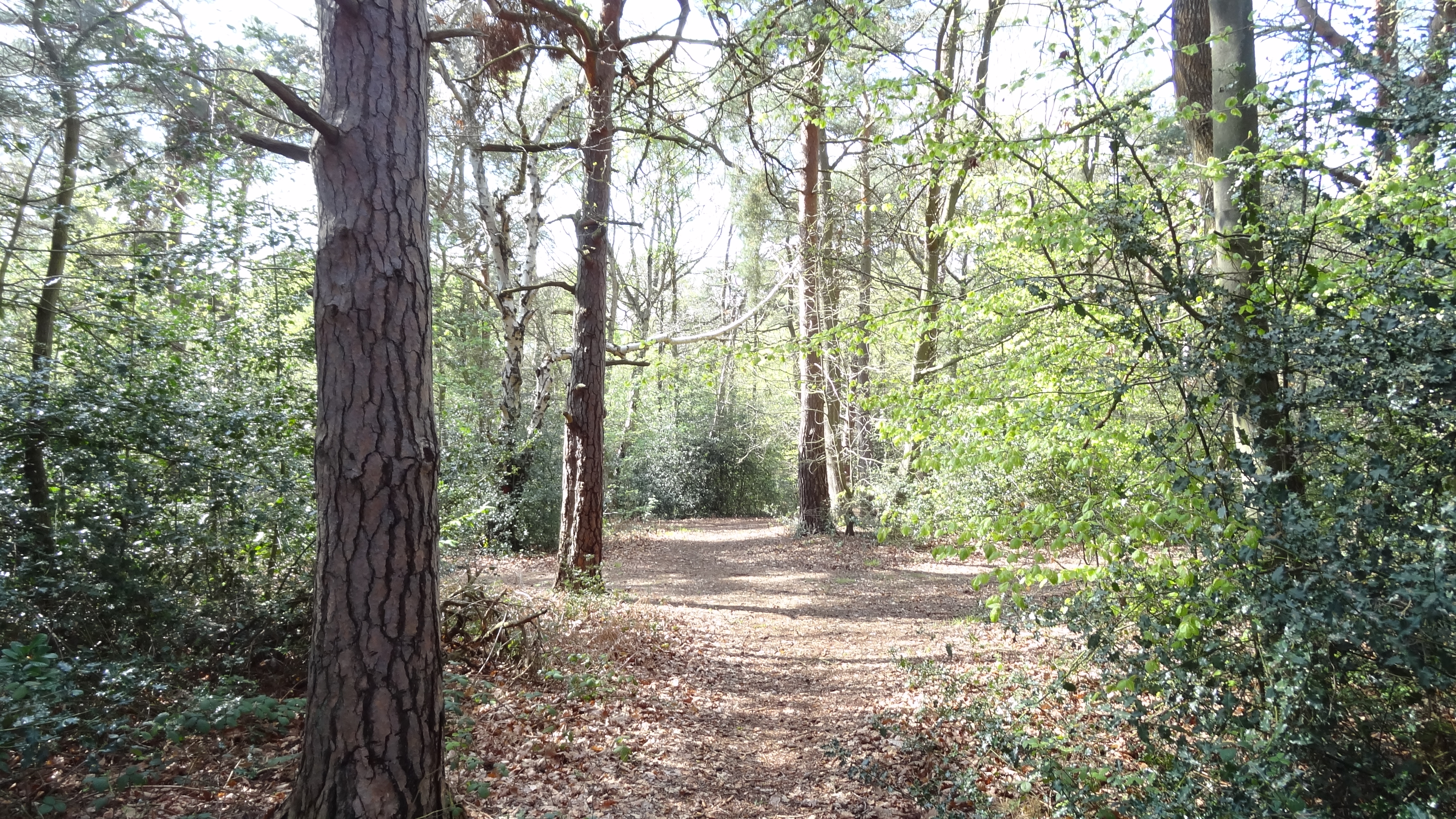
Woods on Keston Common

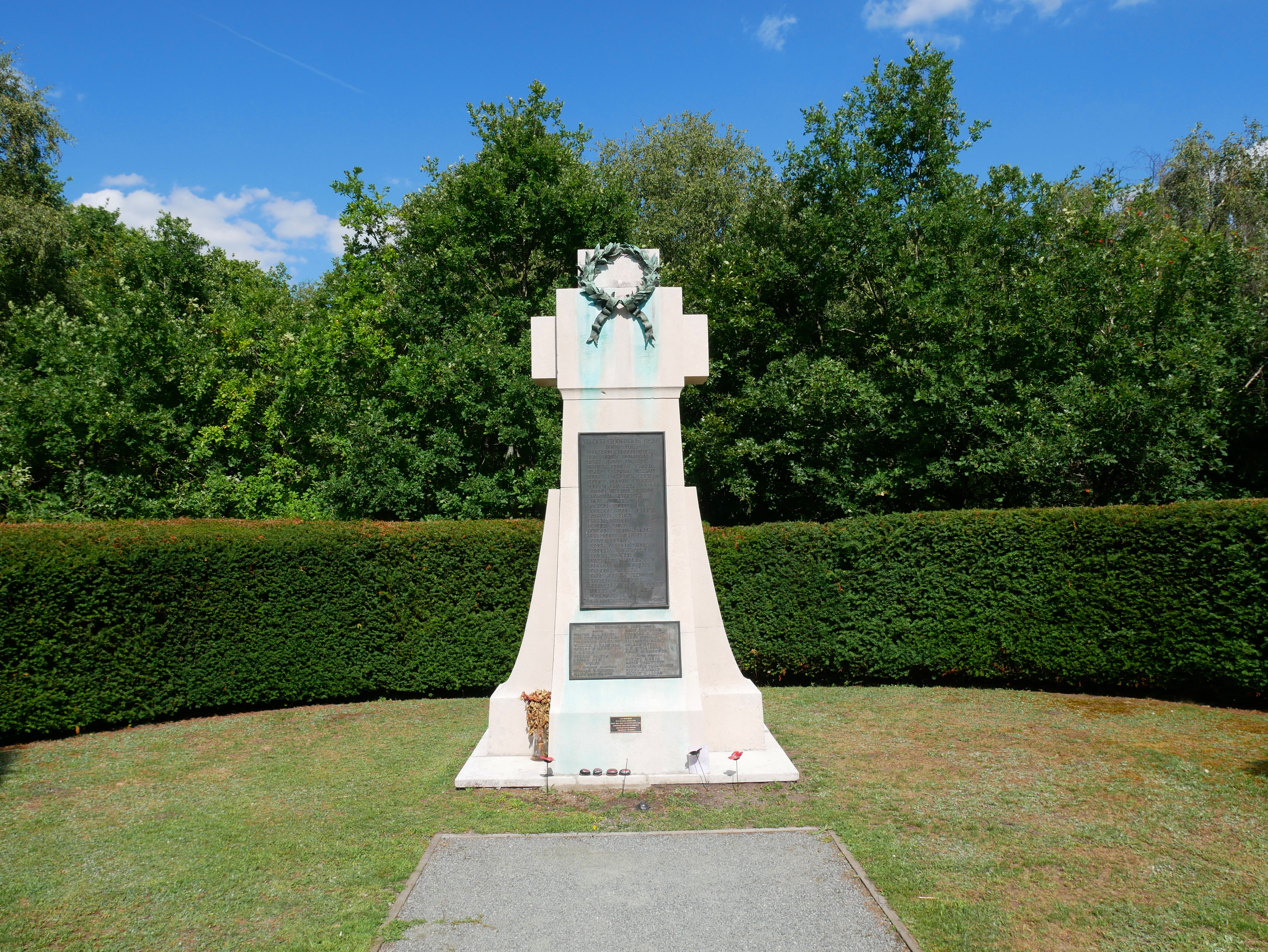
Keston War Memorial

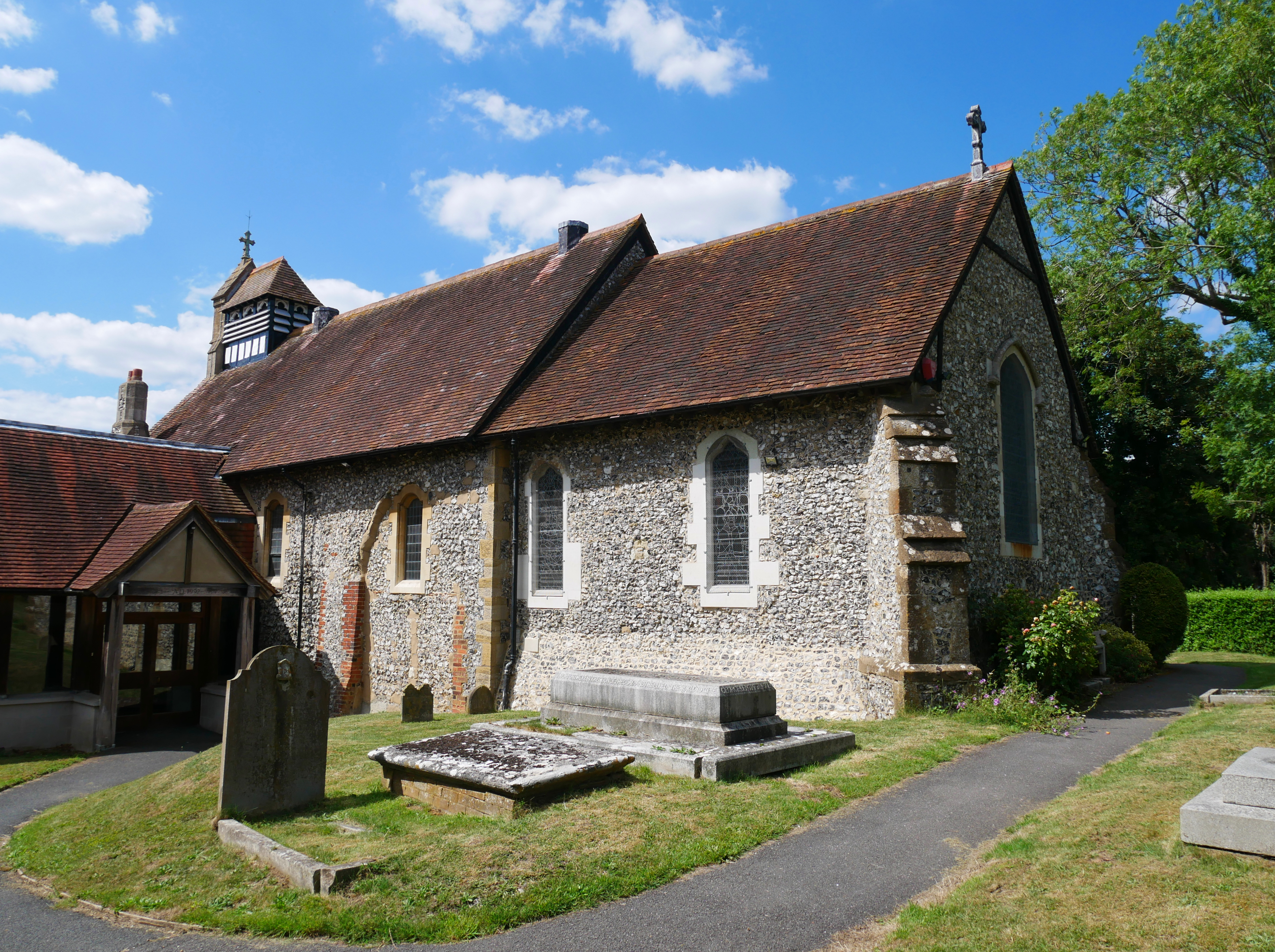
Keston Parish Church
