= Hayes Common =

Common land in Hayes, London, England

Coordinates: 51.369°N 0.020°E

- Site of Special Scientific Interest
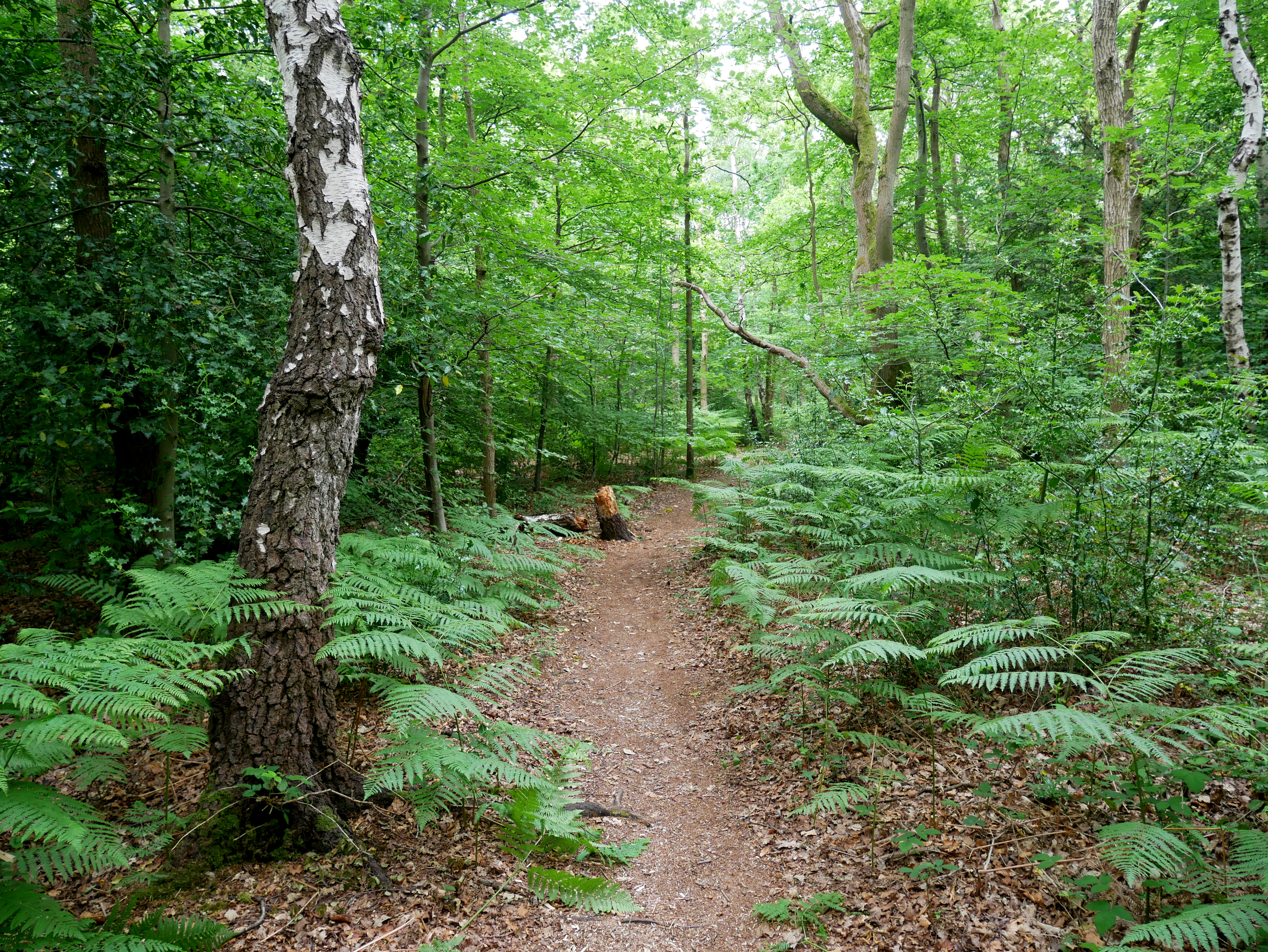
- Pathway through the Hayes Common Site of Special Scientific Interest
- Location of Hayes Common.
- Area of search: Greater London
- Grid reference: TQ411650
- Interest: Biological
- Area: 2.5 ha (6.2 acres)
- Notification date: 1987
- Location map: Magic Map

Hayes Common is a 79-Hectare (195 acre) area of public open land in Hayes in the London Borough of Bromley. It is owned and managed by Bromley Council. It is Site of Metropolitan Importance for Nature Conservation, and a small area is part of the Keston and Hayes Commons Site of Special Scientific Interest. The common is an area of woodland and heath, crossed by bridleways and footpaths. Hayes Common is one of the largest areas of common land in Greater London, with 91.1 hectares (225 acres) of protected common.

== History ==
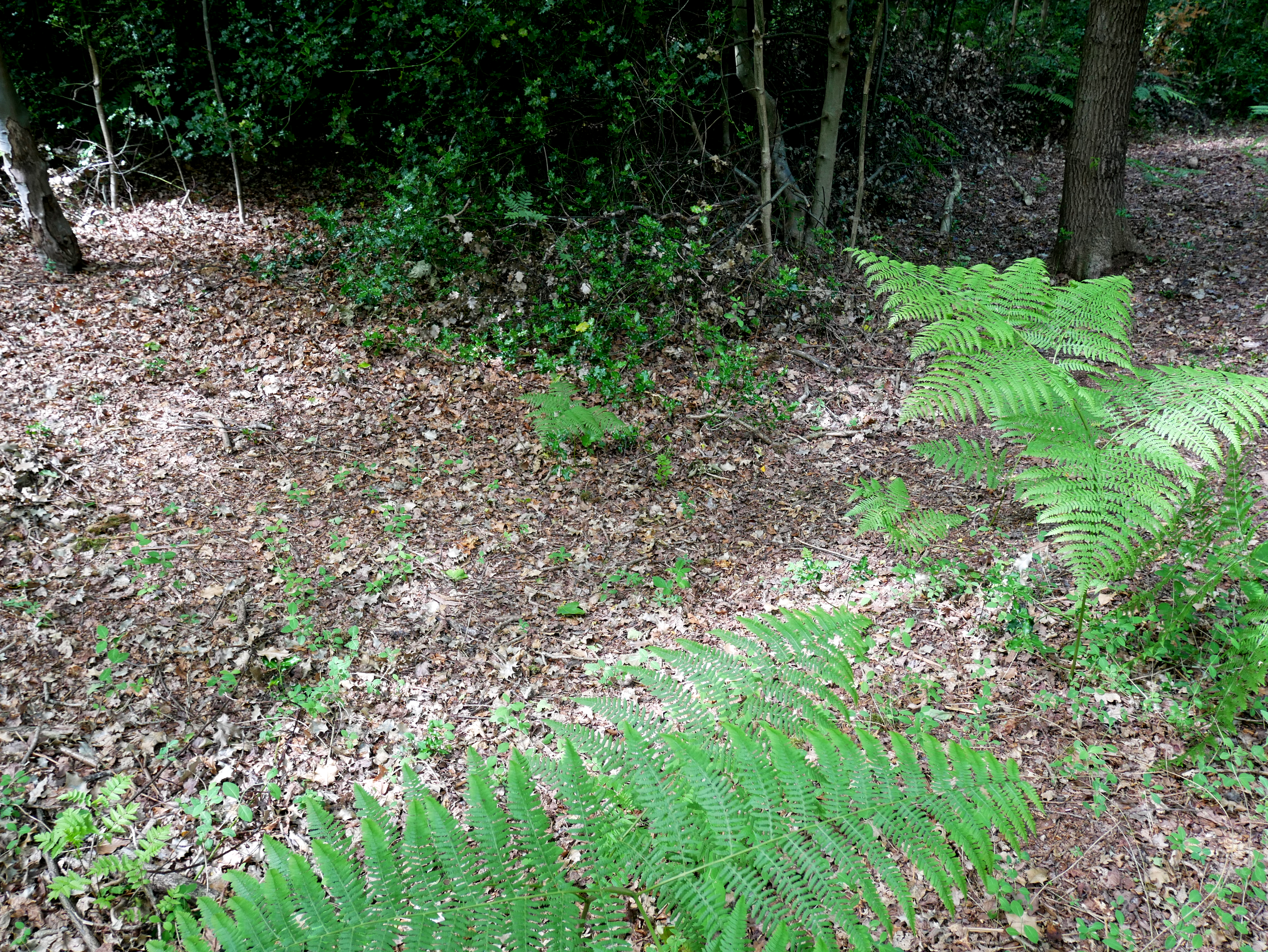
Part of a putatively prehistoric linear earthwork in Hayes Common

Archaeological excavations have revealed pieces from the late-Neolithic period and ditches, pits and post holes dating back to the Bronze Age. The name Hayes is recorded from 1177 as hoese from the Anglo-Saxon meaning "a settlement in open land overgrown with shrubs and rough bushes". The common was used for centuries as a place where local people could collect firewood and graze cattle, and by the early nineteenth century it was the site of the Hays Fair, a popular day out for Londoners.The common has also been the venue for the crowning of the London May Queen for 105 years as of 2017.

In the 1860s the owner of the land, Sir John Lennard, began to sell off plots in the neighbouring West Wickham Common for housing, and the Hayes commoners feared that their common would suffer the same fate. They organised opposition, and in 1869 Hayes Common was the first common to be protected against enclosure under the Metropolitan Commons Act 1866. In 1937 the Municipal Borough of Bromley became the freeholder of the common, and when the Municipal Borough was abolished in 1965 the London Borough of Bromley inherited ownership. In 2000, the Friends of Hayes Common was formed to help maintain the common.

During the Second World War there were eight anti-aircraft guns fitted there, four 4.5 guns on permanent bases and four mobile 3.7 guns

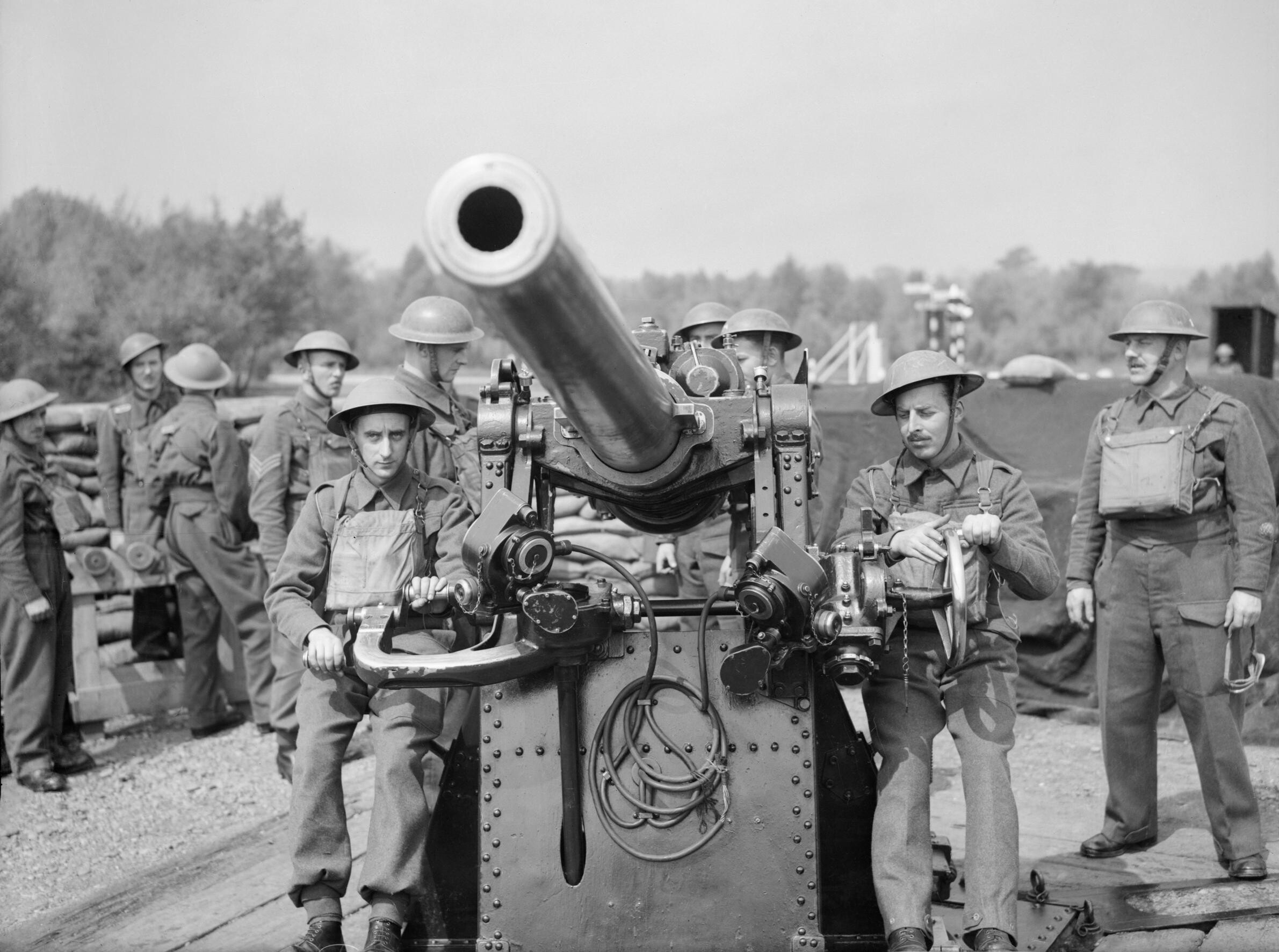
A 3-inch gun crew of 303rd Battery, 99th Anti-Aircraft Regiment, Royal Artillery, at Hayes Common in Kent, May 1940. H1387

== Site of Special Scientific Interest ==
A 2-hectare (4.9-acre) area of shrub heath south east of the junction of Croydon Road and Baston Road forms part of the Keston and Hayes Commons Site of Special Scientific Interest. In 2008 its condition was assessed as "unfavourable recovering".

== Access ==
There is access to the common from Baston Road, Baston Manor Road, Five Elms Road, Croydon Road, Prestons Road, Warren Road, West Common Road and Commonside.

Hayes railway station and buses are nearby.

== See also ==
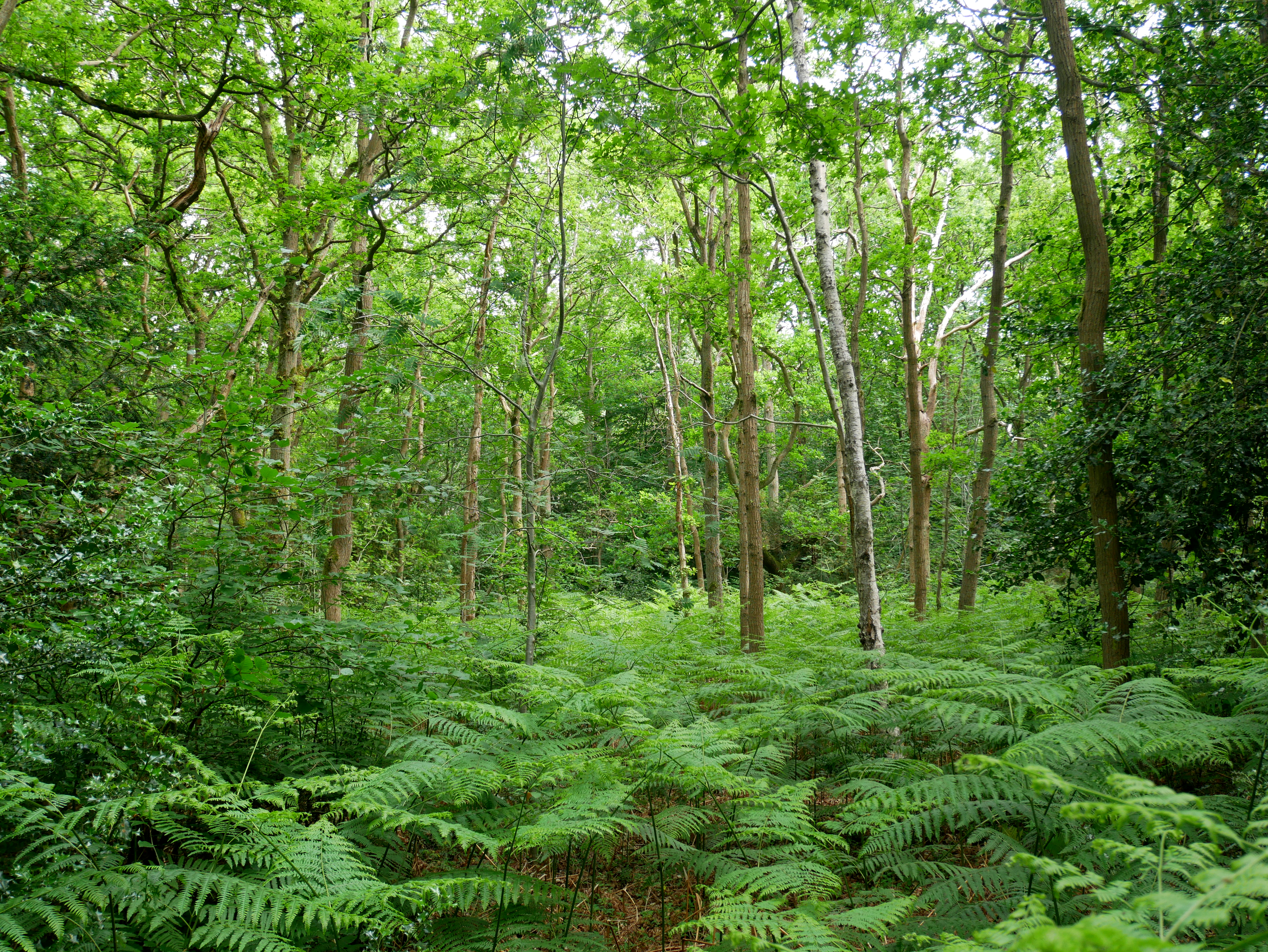
Woodland in Hayes Common

- List of Sites of Special Scientific Interest in Greater London
- Parks and open spaces in the London Borough of Bromley
