= List of churches in the London Borough of Bromley =

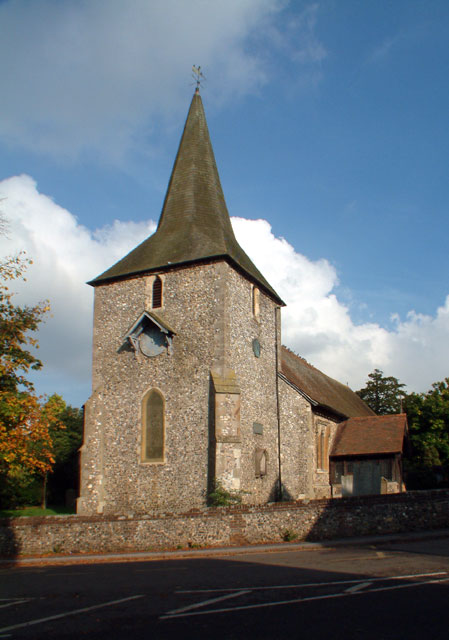
St Mary's Church, Downe

This is a list of cathedrals, churches and chapels in the London Borough of Bromley within the Greater London. The list focuses on the more permanent churches and buildings which identify themselves as places of Christian worship. The denominations appended are those by which they self-identify.

== History ==
London's churches and chapels are extraordinarily numerous and diverse. Anglican and nonconformist churches and chapels are most numerous, but there are also many Catholic churches as well as places of worship for non-Christian religions.

Most of the Anglican churches lie within the Anglican dioceses of London to the north and Southwark to the south. For historical reasons, the Anglican churches in London north of the Thames but east of the River Lea fall within the Diocese of Chelmsford, and those in the London Boroughs of Bexley and Bromley fall within the Diocese of Rochester. As London expanded during the early 19th century, many new churches and chapels were built independently by the growing nonconformist urban population.

=== Significance ===
Although many churches and chapels were entirely or partly lost to 19th-century demolitions and to bombing in the Second World War, many historic, architecturally significant and religiously significant buildings remain. Churches in this list belong to various denominations, as indicated.

== List of churches ==
The borough has an estimated 135 churches for 326,900 inhabitants, a ratio of one to every 2,421 people.

Church name	Location	Dedication	Web	Founded	Denomination	Notes
SS Peter & Paul, Cudham	Cudham	Peter & Paul		C11th	Anglican	United with St Mary, Downe
All Saints, Orpington	Orpington	All Saints		C11th	Anglican	
St Mary, Downe	Downe	Mary		C11th	Anglican	United with SS Peter & Paul, Cudham
Keston Parish Church	Keston	None		C11th	Anglican	
St Giles the Abbot, Farnborough	Farnborough	Giles		C11th	Anglican	
St John, West Wickham	West Wickham	John the Baptist		C11th	Anglican	Rebuilt C15th
St Nicholas, Chislehurst	Chislehurst	Nicholas		C11th	Anglican	Rebuilt C15th
St Martin of Tours, Chelsfield	Chelsfield	Martin of Tours		C11th	Anglican	
St George, Beckenham	Beckenham	George		C12th	Anglican	Rebuilt 1885–1887
SS Peter & Paul, Bromley	Bromley	Peter & Paul		C12th	Anglican	Rebuilt 1327, 1824, 1949–1952
St Mary the Virgin, Hayes	Old Hayes	Mary		C12th	Anglican	
St Botolph's Church, Ruxley	Ruxley	Botwulf of Thorney		C13th	Anglican	Deconsecrated in 1557
St Mary, St Mary Cray	St Mary Cray	Mary		Medieval	Anglican	
Holy Trinity, Bromley Common	Bromley Common	Trinity		1839	Anglican	
St John the Evangelist, Penge	Penge	John the Evangelist		1847	Anglican	
St Mary, Bromley	Bromley	Mary		1862–1863	Anglican	
St George, Bickley	Bickley	George		1864	Anglican	
St Paul, Anerley	Anerley	Paul		1865	Anglican	Anerley Team. Building 1978
St Mary, Shortlands	Shortlands	Mary		1868	Anglican	
Annunciation, Chislehurst	Chislehurst	Annunciation		1870	Anglican	
Christ Church, Chislehurst	Chislehurst	Jesus		1872	Anglican	
St Paul, Beckenham	Beckenham	Paul		1872?	Anglican	
All Souls, Pratt's Bottom	Pratt's Bottom	All Souls		late C19th	Anglican	United with St Mary's Green St Green
Christ Church, Beckenham	Beckenham	Jesus		1875–1876	Anglican	
St Michael & All Angels, Beckenham	Beckenham	Michael & Angels		1877	Anglican	Rebuilt 1890, 1900
Holy Trinity, Beckenham	Penge	Trinity		1878	Anglican	
St James, Beckenham	Beckenham	James		1879	Anglican	
St John the Evangelist, Bromley	Bromley	John the Evangelist		1880	Anglican	
St Edward the Confessor, Mottingham	Mottingham	Edward the Confessor		1880	Anglican	Renamed from St Andrew's and rebuilt 1936
Christ Church, Bromley	Bromley	Jesus		1886	Anglican	
St Luke, Bromley Common	Bromley Common	Luke		1887	Anglican	
St Paul, Crofton	Crofton	Paul		1888	Anglican	
St Andrew, Orpington	Orpington	Andrew		1893	Anglican	
St Mark, Bromley	Bromley	Mark		1898	Anglican	Rebuilt 1952
St Mark, Biggin Hill	Biggin Hill	Mark		1904	Anglican	Building 1952–1959, was redundant All Saints North Peckham
St Augustine, Bromley Common	Bromley Common	Augustine?			Anglican	
St Barnabas, Beckenham	Beckenham	Barnabas			Anglican	
St Andrew, Bromley	Bromley	Andrew		1929–1931	Anglican	
St Francis, West Wickham	West Wickham	Francis of Assisi		1933	Anglican	Building 1936. United with St Mary, West Wickham
St Mary of Nazareth, West Wickham	West Wickham	Mary		1934	Anglican	Building 1954
St Francis of Assisi, Petts Wood	Petts Wood	Francis of Assisi		1935	Anglican	
St Mary, Green Street Green	Green Street Green	Mary		1937	Anglican	United with All Souls Pratts Bottom
St Barnabas, St Paul's Cray	St Paul's Cray	Barnabas		1950	Anglican	Building 1962–1964
St Nicholas, Orpington	Orpington	Nicholas		1957–1958	Anglican	
Unity Church Orpington	Orpington			1969	Anglican	Merger of three churches 2012
Christ Church, Orpington	Orpington	Jesus			Anglican	One part of Unity Church Orpington?
Park Langley Church	Beckenham			2007	Anglican	Plant from Christ Church Bromley
Christ Church, Anerley	Anerley	Jesus			Anglican	Anerley Team. Building 1990
St John, Eden Park	Eden Park	John the Baptist			Anglican	
St Andrew, St Mary Cray	St Mary Cray	Andrew				
St George's RAF Chapel	Biggin Hill	George		1943	Inter-denominational	Rebuilt 1951
St Mary, Chislehurst	Chislehurst	Mary		1852	Roman Catholic	Building 1853–1854
Our Lady of the Crays	St Mary Cray	Mary		1873	Roman Catholic	Was St Joseph's. Building 1895, rebuilt 1950s, 2010
St Anthony of Padua, Anerley	Anerley	Anthony of Padua		1878	Roman Catholic	Rebuilt 1898, 1927
St Edmund of Canterbury, Beckenham	Beckenham	Edmund of Abingdon		1891	Roman Catholic	Building 1891, new buildings 1927, 1938
St Joseph, Bromley	Bromley	Joseph		1892	Roman Catholic	Current building 1912
Holy Innocents, Orpington	Orpington	Holy Innocents		1909	Roman Catholic	
St Swithun, Bromley Common	Bromley Common	Swithun		1910	Roman Catholic	
St Theresa, Biggin Hill	Biggin Hill	Thérèse of Lisieux		1925	Roman Catholic	Building 1930
St Mark, West Wickham	West Wickham	Mark		1936	Roman Catholic	Building 1938, current 1962–1963
St James the Great, Petts Wood	Petts Wood	James		1937	Roman Catholic	First building 1939, current 1964
Our Lady of the Rosary, Hayes	Hayes	Mary		1938	Roman Catholic	Building 1956
St Patrick, West Chislehurst	Chislehurst	Patrick		1953	Roman Catholic	Building 1961 (was previously a cinema)
St Michael & All Angels, Farnborough	Farnborough	Michael & Angels		1961–1964	Roman Catholic	
St John's Coptic Orthodox Church	Beckenham	John?			Coptic Orthodox	
Bromley Baptist Church	Bromley			1863	Baptist	
Bromley Common Baptist Church	Bromley Common				Baptist Union	
Penge Baptist Church	Penge			1865	Baptist Union	
Beckenham Baptist Church	Beckenham			1883	Baptist Union	
Poverest Road Baptist Church	Orpington			1930s	Baptist	Building 1960s
Coney Hill Baptist Church	Coney Hill			1940s	Baptist	
Avenue Baptist Church, Beckenham	Beckenham				Baptist Union	
Chislehurst Baptist Church	Chislehurst				Baptist	
Crofton Baptist Church	Crofton				Baptist	
Orpington Baptist Church	Orpington				Baptist	
Green Street Green Baptist Church	Green Street Green				Baptist	
Southborough Lane Baptist Church	Bromley				Baptist	
Hayesford Park Baptist Church	Hayes				Baptist	
Elmstead Baptist Church	Chislehurst				Baptist	
New Life Church Biggin Hill	Biggin Hill			1923	Baptist / Newfrontiers	Renamed 1985, 2009
Anerley Methodist Church	Anerley			1865	Methodist	Blackheath & Crystal Palace circuit
Chislehurst Methodist Church	Chislehurst			1868–1870	Methodist	
Beckenham Methodist Church	Beckenham				Methodist	Bromley Circuit. Two church buildings
Bromley Common Methodist Church	Bromley Common				Methodist	
Bromley Methodist Church	Bromley				Methodist	Bromley Circuit
Hawes Lane Methodist Church	West Wickham				Methodist	Bromley Circuit
Orpington Methodist Church	Orpington			1909	Methodist	New building 1953
Petts Wood Methodist Church	Petts Wood				Methodist	
Mottingham Methodist Church	Mottingham				Methodist	Orpington & Chislehurst Circuit
Beckenham United Reformed Church	Beckenham			1875	URC	Began as Beckenham Congregational
Bromley United Reformed Church	Bromley				URC	Shared pastor with Trinity Bromley URC
Hayes Free Church	Hayes				URC	
St John's URC, Orpington	Orpington	John?			URC	
Temple URC, St Mary Cray	St Mary Cray	Temple		1853	URC	Rebuilt 1955
Emmanuel United Reformed Church	West Wickham	Jesus		1886	URC	
Elmers End Free Church	Elmers End			1880	URC	Shares pastor with Emmanuel URC West Wickham
Trinity Bromley United Reformed Church	Bromley	Trinity		1895	URC	Founded as Trinity Presbyterian
Christ Church URC, Petts Wood	Petts Wood	Jesus		1939	URC	Began as Petts Wood Congregational
Giggs Hill Church	St Paul's Cray			1958	URC	Began as St Paul's Congregational
Christ Lutheran Church	Petts Wood	Jesus			Evangelical Lutheran	
Bromley Temple Corps	Bromley			1886	Salvation Army	
St Mary Cray Salvation Army	St Mary Cray				Salvation Army	
Penge Salvation Army	Penge				Salvation Army	
Penge Congregational Church	Penge			1912	Cong Federation	May predate building
Elmstead Baptist Church	Chislehurst				FIEC	
Downe Baptist Church	Downe			1851	Grace Baptist SE	
Hayes Lane Baptist Church	Bromley			1893	Grace Baptist SE	
Bromley Quaker Meeting	Bromley				Quakers	Building 1962
Orpington Quaker Meeting	Orpington				Quakers	Began following closure of Petts Wood meeting
Holmcroft Church	Bromley			1986	Assemblies of God	
BCC Church	Bromley				Assemblies of God	
Hope Church Bromley	Bromley Common				Newfrontiers	Meets in St Luke's Bromley Common
Hope Church Chislehurst	Chislehurst				Newfrontiers	
Hope Church Downham	Downham				Newfrontiers	
Hope Church Orpington	Orpington				Newfrontiers	
Hope Church West Wickham	West Wickham				Newfrontiers	
King's Church St Paul's Cray	St Paul's Cray			1997	Newfrontiers	
King's Church London – Downham	Downham				Newfrontiers	Prev. Downham Way Family Church. Joined KCL 2011
Ichthus Chislehurst	Chislehurst			1980s	Ichthus	
Bromley Vineyard Church	Bromley				Vineyard	
RCCG Inner Court	Beckenham				RCCG	
RCCG His Royal Majesty's House	St Paul's Cray			2003	RCCG	
Mountain of Fire & Miracles Ministries	Beckenham				MOFAM	
Citygate Church	Beckenham				Christian Outreach Ctr	
Jubilee Church Bromley	Bromley Common			1970s	Pioneer Network	EA
Neighbourhood Church Beckenham	Beckenham				Independent	
New Creation Church London	Chislehurst				Independent	
Bromley Town Church	Bromley				Independent	EA
Vineyard Chapel Bromley	Bromley				Independent	
Brook Lane Community Church	Downham			1928	Independent	EA
The Oak Community Church	St Paul's Cray				Independent	EA
Cornerstone Christian Centre	Bromley	Jesus		1982	Independent	
The River Church	St Paul's Cray				Independent	
Fullness of Christ Ministries	Orpington			2010	Independent	
Amazing Grace Church	Bromley				Independent	

=== Defunct churches ===
Church name	Location	Dedication	Founded	Ended	Denomination	Notes
SS Peter & Paul, St Paul's Cray	St Paul's Cray	Peter & Paul	1950s	2008	Roman Catholic	Merged into St Joseph's St Mary Cray (renamed St Mary of the Crays)

== Related lists ==
- List of churches in London
- List of Christopher Wren churches in London
- List of places of worship in London, 1804
- Union of Benefices Act 1860
- Commission for Building Fifty New Churches

== External links/sources ==
- Anglican Diocese of London
- Baptist Union Churches
- Church of England Parish Finder
- Church of England churches in central London
- The Church of Jesus Christ of Latter-day Saints
- The History Files Churches of the British Isles
- Congregational Churches in London
- Friends of the City Churches
- Gospel Hall Finder
- Greek Orthodox Archdiocese of Thyateira and Great Britain
- Love's Guide to the Church Bells of the City of London
- Methodist Church of Great Britain Church Search
- Roman Catholic Diocese of Brentwood Parishes A-Z
- Roman Catholic Diocese of Westminster – Virtual Diocese
- Roman Catholic Archdiocese of Southwark – Parish Directory
- Seventh-day Adventist Churches in London
- United Reformed Church Find A Church
- Redeemed Christian Church of God
