= Ruxley =

Suburb of south-east London

Coordinates: 51.4131°N 0.1364°E

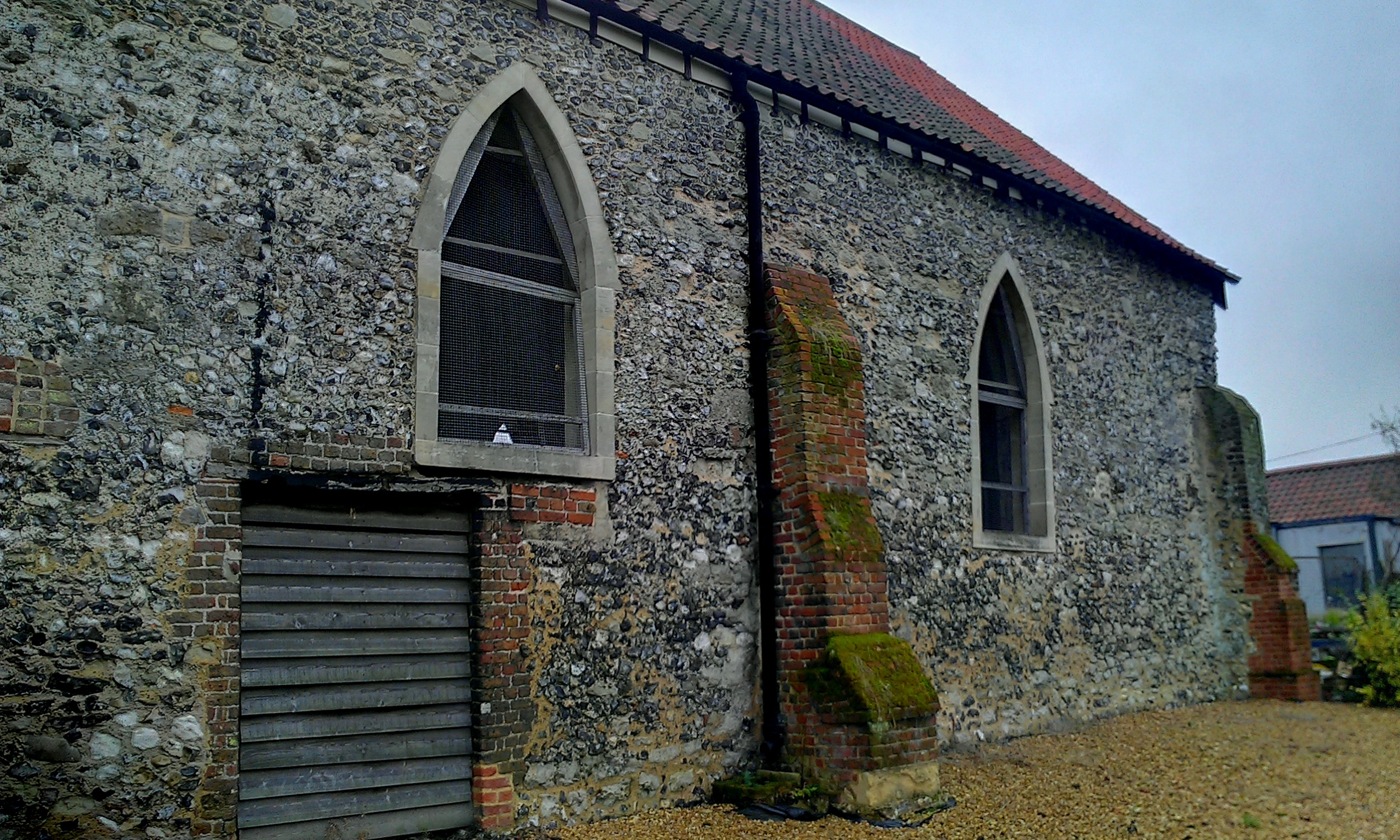

- Location within Greater London
- OS grid reference: TQ485704
  - Charing Cross: 13 mi (21 km) SEbE
- London borough: Bexley; Bromley
- Ceremonial county: Greater London
- Region: London
- Country: England
- Sovereign state: United Kingdom
- Post town: Sidcup
- Postcode district: DA14
- Post town: Orpington
- Postcode district: BR5
- Dialling code: 020; 01689
- Police: Metropolitan
- Fire: London
- Ambulance: London
- UK Parliament: Old Bexley and Sidcup; Orpington
- London Assembly: Bexley and Bromley; Bexley and Bromley

Ruxley is a rural settlement of South East London, England that straddles the boundary of the London Boroughs of Bromley and Bexley. It is located 13 miles southeast of Charing Cross, the traditional centre of London, in the Metropolitan Green Belt between Sidcup and Swanley and is also adjacent to the Greater London border with the county of Kent.

== About Ruxley ==
Ruxley was a parish prior to 1557 and had its own thirteenth century church, St Botolph's. Ruxley's central location on the main road made it an important meeting place for the Hundred of Ruxley, which was named after it. Ruxley Gravel Pits is a biological Site of Special Scientific Interest located on the west side of Ruxley. Today the area is known for Ruxley Manor, a large site with a garden centre and other retailers and services.

== Name and toponymy ==
In 1086 the settlement of Ruxley was recorded in the Domesday Book as Rochelei It was also recorded as Rochelea and Rocheslea in 1175 as a parish and settlement Rokesle in the 1190s, as Rokeli in 1199, and Rokeslega in 1211, and Rooksley in 1719. The name possibly meant 'wood or clearing frequented by rooks' from the Old English words hrōc (rook) and lēah (wood clearing). It has also been suggested the first element may be from an Old English personal name Hrōc or Hroca.

The hundred that covered Ruxley was originally called Helmestrei, a name that had been used since at least the time of the Domesday Book in 1086. By at least the late thirteenth century, the name Helmestrei was no longer in use, and the hundred came to be known as Hundred of Ruxley taking its new name from the settlement of Ruxley, which was the meeting place of the hundred, located on the main road, which passed through it.

== History ==
Ruxley was recorded in the Domesday Book of 1086, as a settlement of 20 households, with woodland, pigs and a mill located in the Hundred of Ruxley, within the Lathe of Sutton at Hone. At that time Ruxley was recorded as having more households than the surrounding settlements of North Cray, Foots Cray and St Paul's Cray, but less than Orpington, St Mary Cray, Bexley and Chelsfield. A family who possessed much of the lands of North Cray and Ruxley took their surname from Ruxley. Malgerius de Rokesle possessed the lands at the time of the Domesday Book in 1086, in the late 13th century Gregory de Rokesley, a wealthy wool merchant and goldsmith from Ruxley, moved to London and later served as the Sheriff of London, Lord Chamberlain and Lord Mayor of London at different times. In the thirteenth century, St Botolph's Church was constructed in Ruxley.

Ruxley was a distinct parish of its own, until 1557 when Cardinal Reginald Pole, the archbishop of Canterbury deconsecrated the church and united Ruxley parish with North Cray parish, located northwest of Ruxley. The new larger parish was sometimes referred to as North Cray with Ruxley, or sometimes just by the existing name, North Cray.

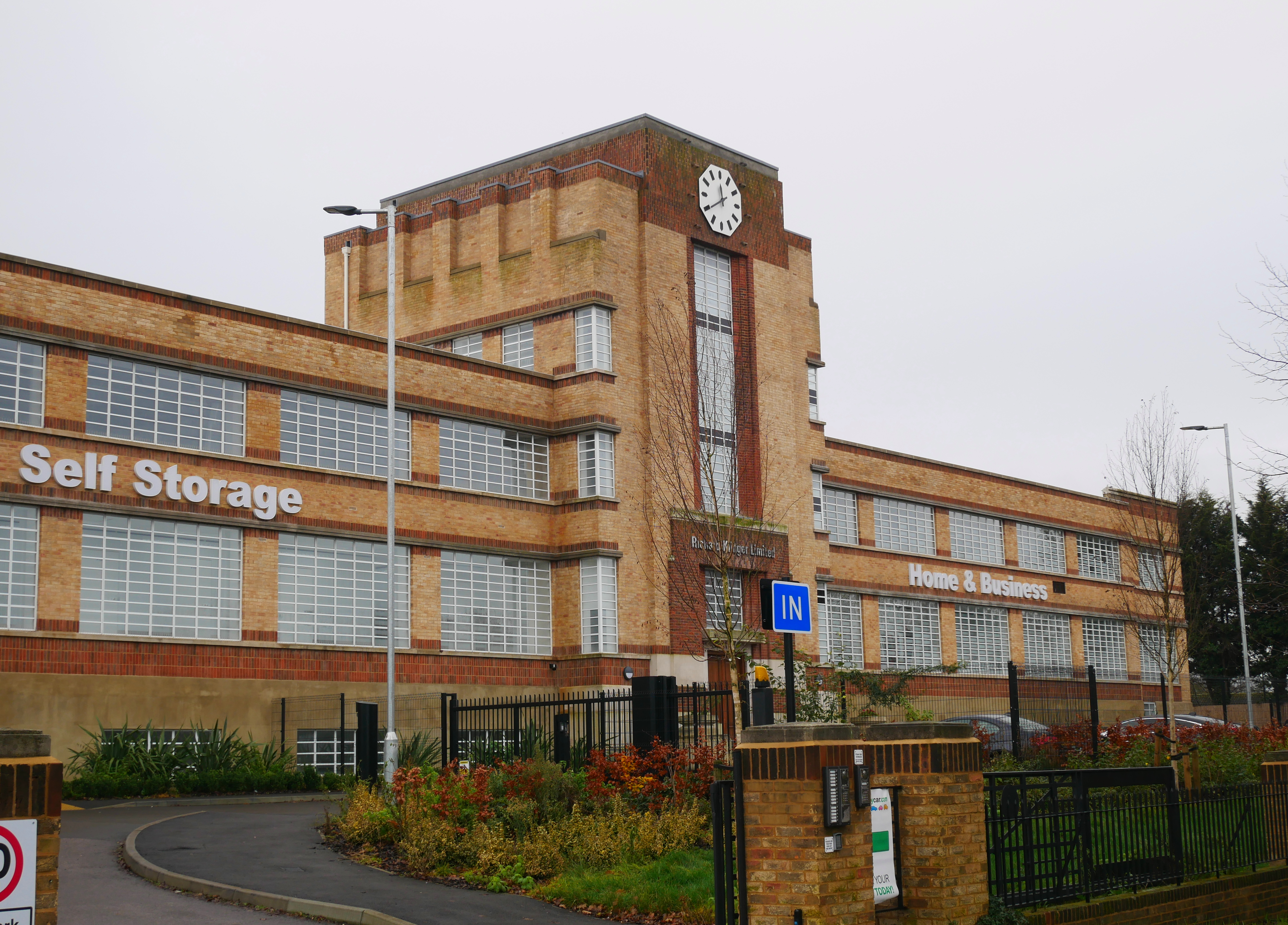
The 1930s Klinger Building in Ruxley, a Grade II listed building

On 21 June 1819 William Mansfield, 1st Baron Sandhurst was born in Ruxley, he was a British military commander who served as Commander-in-Chief of India from 1865 to 1870.

The Hundred of Ruxley became obsolete at the end of the nineteenth century when new districts began to be created. In 1894 North Cray parish, including the settlement of Ruxley formed part of the newly created Bromley Rural District that existed from that year until 1934 when it was abolished. In 1934 North Cray and Ruxley became part of the Chislehurst and Sidcup Urban District which was formed that year from the previous districts, Sidcup Urban District, Chislehurst Urban District, and a small part of the Bromley Rural District that contained North Cray and Ruxley. In 1965 the urban district and its parishes were abolished and Greater London and the London boroughs were created. Sidcup and North Cray were then part of the London Borough of Bexley and Chislehurst became part of the London Borough of Bromley, Ruxley ended up on the common boundary of the Bexley and Bromley boroughs, as the border between them in this location follows Maidstone Road, the main road that Ruxley is located on.

== St Botolph's Church ==
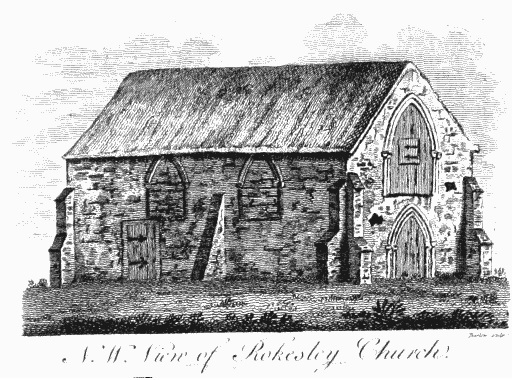
"N.W. view of Rokesley Church" Engraving of St Botolph's Church, Ruxley, appearing in The History and Topographical Survey of the County of Kent: Volume 2. by Edward Hasted

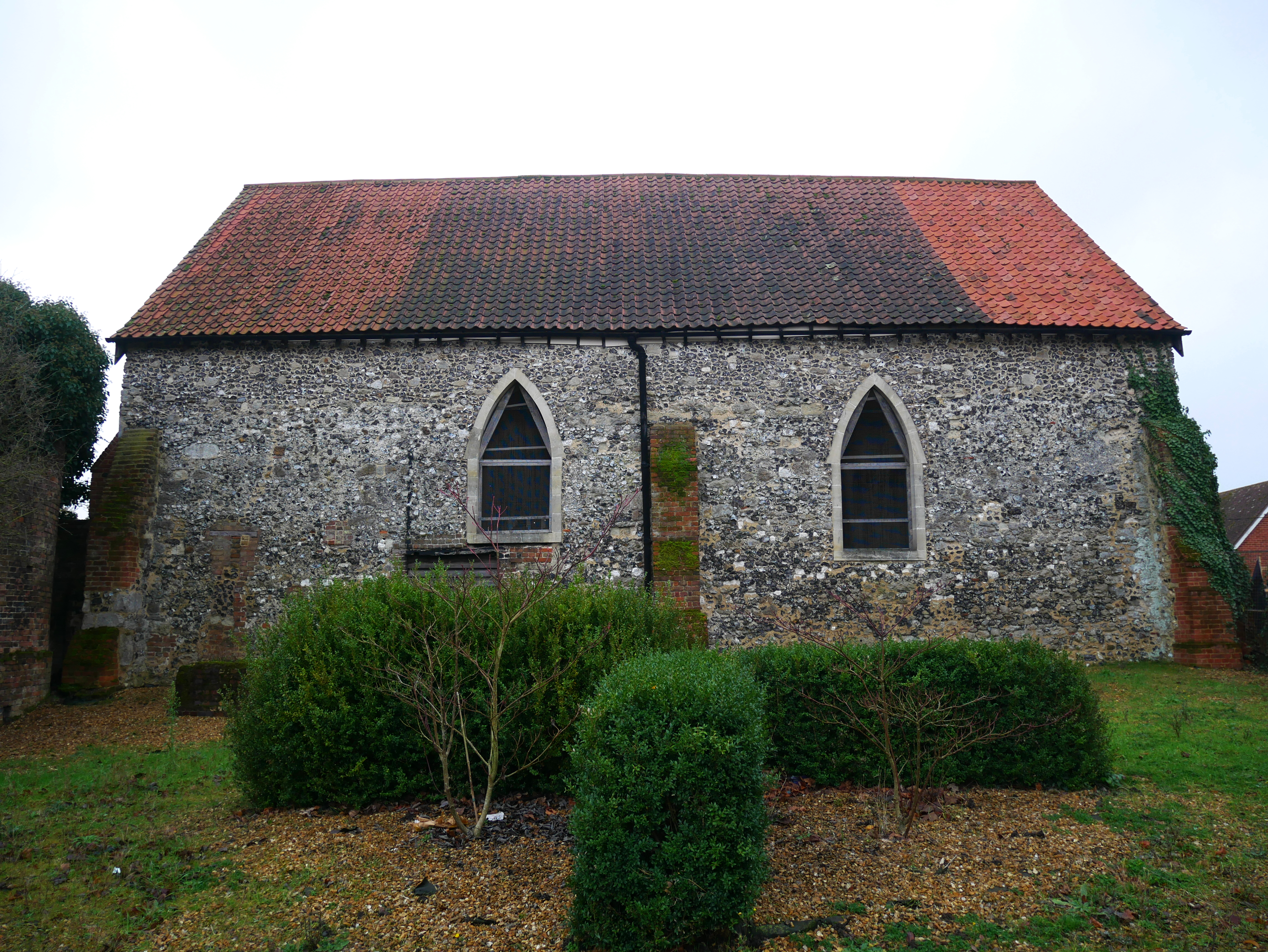
The north face of St Botolph's Church

St Botolph's Church, a church dedicated to Botwulf of Thorney was built in the thirteenth century in Ruxley, on the south side of Maidstone Road. It was in use for around 300 years but was deconsecrated by Cardinal Reginald Pole in 1557, the same year he united Ruxley parish with that of North Cray into one parish. The church building was used as a barn for over 400 years and was used to store agricultural equipment. In the 1960s archaeological work was carried out on the site and found evidence of an older wooden building, suggesting there may have been an older Saxon church in the same location. Today the church is a Grade II listed building and a scheduled ancient monument on the grounds of Ruxley Manor Garden Centre, and is owned by the Evans family. Although many features are still intact, including the majority of the roof, the church is in disrepair, and appears as "remains of church" on Ordnance Survey maps. English Heritage have agreed to pay a grant of £35,000 of the estimated £62,000 needed for structural work on the building to help preserve it.

== Ruxley Gravel Pits ==
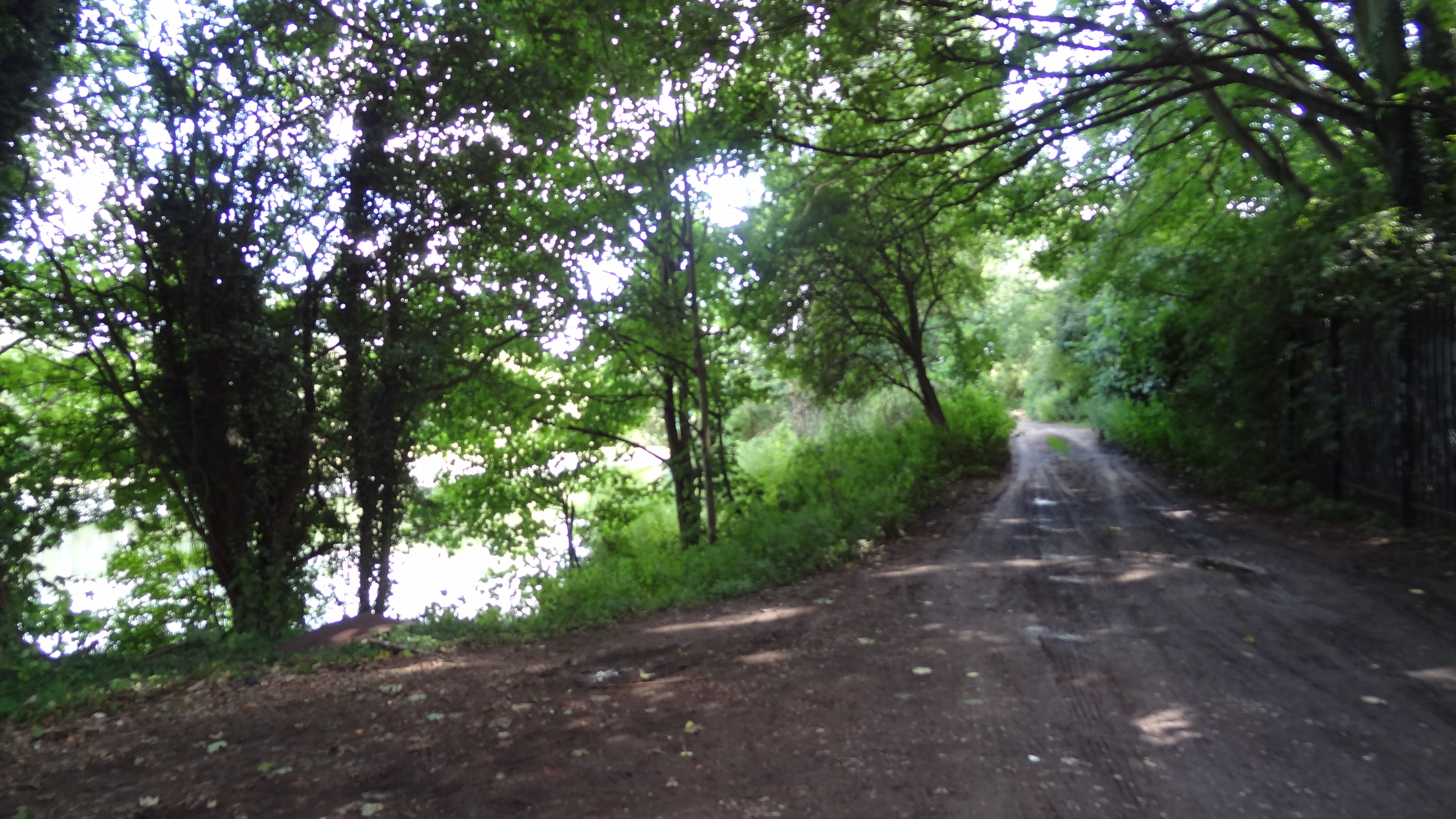
Ruxley Gravel Pits viewed from Edgington Way

Originally dug between 1929 and 1951, Ruxley Gravel Pits is a biological Site of Special Scientific Interest, to the west of Ruxley, near Crittal's Corner roundabout; it is 18.7-hectare (46-acre) in size on the borough boundary with parts within the London boroughs of Bromley and Bexley. The site is also a Site of Metropolitan Importance for Nature Conservation, owned by the Environment Agency and managed by Kent Wildlife Trust. Natural England has assessed its condition as "unfavourable recovering".

The site comprises four gravel pits, which are now lakes, and the River Cray runs through three of them, while the fourth is fed by springs. The A20 road Sidcup Bypass now cuts through the north side of the site. The bodies of water are also referred to as Ruxley Lakes, and although not open to the public they are also used for angling. Gravel extraction took place from 1929 to 1951, and once it ceased the pits attracted many species of birds and a diverse range of plants. In 1975 the site was designated an SSSI.

Over 500 species of vascular plants and 169 of birds have been recorded, including song thrush, reed bunting, kingfisher and skylark. Fifty-three of the bird species are breeding. Insects include 23 species of butterfly, 9 dragonfly and over 500 beetles. This variety reflects the diversity of habitat: wooded islands, fringes of mature trees, scrub, fen and open water. Vegetation on the banks include the rare club rush Schoenoplectus tabernaemontani. The open water areas have rafts of yellow and white water-lily.

Access to the site is reserved to members of the Orpington and District Angling Society and permit holders. It is closed to members of the public.

== Transport ==
=== Roads ===
The main road that runs through Ruxley is named Maidstone Road, today it is a relatively straight road, designated the B2173 road running east to west. To the east, it goes uphill through Upper Ruxley, Birchwood Corner and changes its name to High Street then London Road as it skirts Swanley town centre before joining junction 3 of the M25 motorway where the B road ends. To the west, Maidstone Road continues downhill over Ruxley Corner roundabout, at which the B road designation ends, but Maidstone Road continues west over the River Cray then through Foots Cray and uphill to Sidcup as the A 211 road named Maidstone Road, Foots Cray High Street, Sidcup Hill, and Sidcup High Street; further west it's named Main Road and Foots Cray Road and reaches Eltham. Maidstone Road was historically the route of the original A20 road, the main route from London to Maidstone; old maps show it was previously a winding road as it passed through Ruxley, and part of it survives today as a crescent road named Old Maidstone Road to the south of the present Maidstone Road leaving and rejoining it after about 500 metres. In the Ruxley area the B2173 marks the border between the London Borough of Bexley to the north, and the London Borough of Bromley to the south.

Just to the south of Maidstone Road, the new A20 road runs east to west, it is a dual-carriageway, and a primary trunk road route. The section near Ruxley was built as a bypass road in 1968 to bypass Swanley. It is named Sidcup Bypass then Sidcup Road to the west where it bypasses Sidcup and Eltham towards Lee and Lewisham, and named Swanley Bypass to the east, until it meets the M25 near Swanley then continues on through Kent, all the way to Dover on the coast. In the Ruxley area, Sidcup Bypass marks the border between the postcode districts, DA14 SIDCUP to the north, BR5 ORPINGTON to the southwest, and BR8 SWANLEY to the southeast.

Ruxley Corner, is a roundabout, located immediately west of Ruxley, which has five exits, two of which are the aforementioned Maidstone Road, to the east and west. North-northeast from here is North Cray, a dual-carriageway A road, designated the A223 road, it travels 4 km north to Bexley, where it ceases to be a dual-carriageway and continues to a junction and bridge over the A2 road, Rochester Way, as Bexley High Street and Bourne Road, before meeting Watling Street at Crayford. To the southeast of Ruxley Corner the A223 road continues as Edgington Way for 1 km before reaching Crittall's Corner. Sandy Lane, is a minor road that travels south from Ruxley Corner through St Paul's Cray. Crittall's Corner, named after a window factory, comprises a much bigger and grade separated roundabout west of Ruxley and immediately south of Foots Cray. This roundabout also has five exits, the new A20 road, Sidcup By-pass set on a flyover and a deep level N-S cycle track, but has access roads joining it, the A224 road, starts in Foots Cray 1 km to the north as Cray Road, then crosses Crittall's Corner roundabout then travels south as Sevenoaks Way, Cray Avenue and other names for about 15 km passing through St Paul's Cray, St Mary Cray, Orpington and eventually reaching the M25 and Sevenoaks.

=== Buses ===
The following London Buses routes serve Ruxley.

- 233 to Eltham via Sidcup or to Swanley.
- 492 to Sidcup or to Bluewater via Bexleyheath & Dartford.

=== Rail ===
The nearest National Rail stations to Ruxley are Sidcup and Swanley.

== Sport and leisure ==
There are three golf courses near by, two at Orpington Golf Centre to the south and one at Birchwood Park Golf further away to the east. Orpington Golf Centre is located immediately south of Ruxley and the A20 road Sidcup Bypass, its entrance is on Sandy Lane. This golf centre has two eighteen hole golf courses, Ruxley Park Golf Course on the western side built in 1975, and also has a driving range, and the much larger Cray Valley Golf Course on the eastern side, which also has an additional nine-hole course too. East of Ruxley near Upper Ruxley, is Birchwood Park Golf and Country Club, just into Kent, it has a main eighteen hole course and a nine-hole short course named Orchard Course; it also has a driving range and they are planning to open a new health and fitness club with gym and swimming pool.

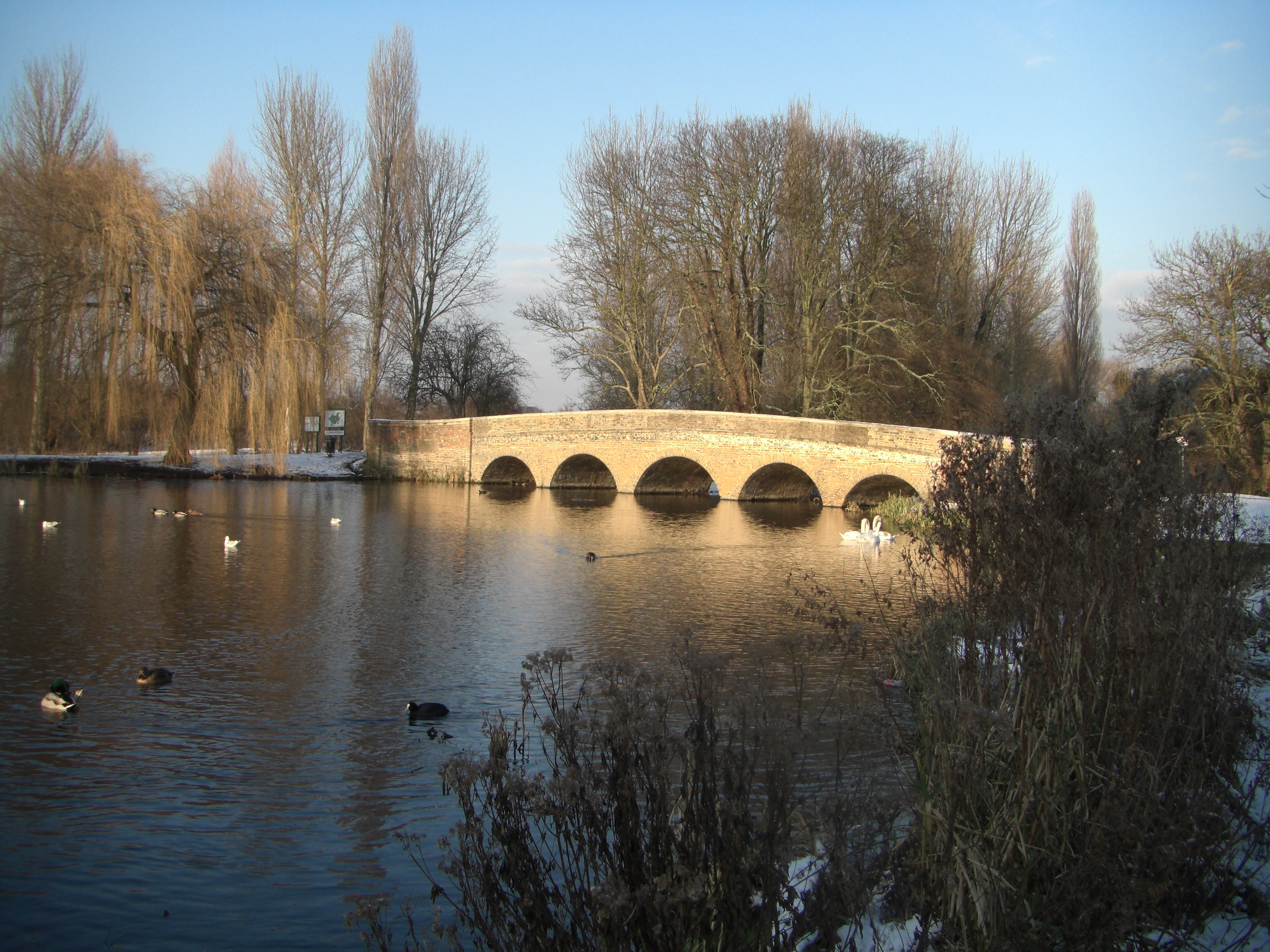
Five Arches Bridge, Foots Cray Meadows

Bromley Ski Centre, was located on Sandy Lane near Ruxley Park Golf Course, with a 120-metre dry ski slope and two lifts, plus indoor skiing, and snowboarding. The facility closed in March 2016 due to reduced usage and income. At Ruxley Manor just to the south of Maidstone Road, there is a 420 square metre artificial, outdoor, ice skating rink that has opened during the winter since 2012. An angling club named Orpington and District Angling Association uses Ruxley Lakes as one of their fishing sites.

Ruxley Wood, is a 40-acre woodland, about 500 metres across, and has been used to host paintballing for several years, there are seven game fields, some use wooden structures, others just the woodland for cover. The same area is also used for lasertag.

=== Foots Cray Meadows ===
Foots Cray Meadows is an area of parkland and woodland 97 hectares (240 acres) in size; it is located northwest of Ruxley, and the River Cray flows northward through it. The Meadows are a Local Nature Reserve and a Site of Metropolitan Importance for Nature Conservation. They have also received a Green Flag Award. Two notable footbridges cross the River Cray in the meadows: Five Arches bridge and the smaller Penny Farthing Bridge. The area was originally a part of the Footscray Place estate, and during the 18th century the Five Arches bridge was built. At the same time, an almshouse was built adjacent to the woods, which, as of 2008, was being excavated by archaeologists belonging to Bexley Archaeological Group. After the house's destruction, in the late 1940s, the area was turned into a public recreation park. In the early 2000s, Five Arches bridge was renovated with new stone.

== Retail, commerce and services ==
Several large retailers have used the open spaces in Ruxley next to the main roads to build stores, mostly Edgington Way. There is a Tesco superstore and petrol garage located in Ruxley on Edgington Way.

There are several Car dealerships in Ruxley, Porsche being next to the Tesco store, a BMW showroom on Maidstone Road and Toyota and Lexus showrooms also on Maidstone Road, on the Foots Cray side.

There is a Bookers cash and carry, wholesalers on Edgington Way, opposite The Tesco store. There is also a Screwfix warehouse, a BP garage and a timber merchant Alsford Timber Ruxley, and Selco Builders Warehouse on Edgington Way. In Upper Ruxley to the east, there is service area on the A20 road, Sidcup Bypass which includes a 24-hour McDonald's drive-through, another BP garage and a Subway restaurant. Several of the farms in and near Ruxley sell produce and goods straight to the public too.

Other services in Ruxley include a driving theory test centre, and Maidstone Road Re-Use and Recycling Centre, one of two council rubbish dumps in the London Borough of Bexley.

The Coca-Cola Company has a large manufacturing and bottling plant between Foots Cray and Ruxley which opened in 1961 and employs 361 people. This plant was where Dasani water was produced.

Richard Klinger Group, an Austrian company which made engine gaskets, hydraulic pipelines and water level gauges and valves, had a factory in Ruxley built in 1937 in a Modernist architectural style. The Klinger factory, which was later bought by French company Trouvey Cauvin, closed in the 1990s and the building was severely damaged by fire in 2013. It will shortly reopen as a self-storage facility, but only three facades have survived the conversion.

=== Ruxley Manor ===
A site where the original church and farm were, Ruxley Manor garden centre, is located here to the south of Maidstone Road, includes two large car parks and several plant nurseries. The site also has other services, it sells food, much of which is produced locally, and there are two restaurants named Mulberry Tree Restaurant, and The Coach House Restaurant, there is also a pet store with a specialist fish aquatic centre. Other activities on the site include a children's soft play area, a seasonal ice skating rink, and Santa's Grotto, with reindeer which live there permanently, plus a children's day care centre, Grace's Nursery.
