= Orpington Urban District =

Former local government district in Kent, England

Coordinates: 51°24′N 0°7′E

Orpington
- Area
  - 1951/1961: 20,842 acres
- Population
  - 1939: 49,500
  - 1951: 63,364
  - 1961: 80,293
- History
  - Origin: Kent Review Order 1934
  - Created: 1934
  - Abolished: 1965
  - Succeeded by: London Borough of Bromley
- Status: Urban district Civil parish
- Government: Orpington Urban District Council
  - HQ: Lynwood House
  - Motto: PROGREDIOR (I PROGRESS)

Orpington was an English local government district in northwest Kent from 1934 to 1965 around the town of Orpington. It was a suburb of London and formed part of the Metropolitan Police District. Most of the former area of the urban district is now part of the London Borough of Bromley in Greater London.

== History ==
It was created as an urban district on 1 April 1934 from parts of the abolished districts of Bromley Rural District and Chislehurst Urban District, taking in the entirety of Chelsfield, Cudham, and Knockholt parishes, and most of Farnborough, part of Keston, most of Orpington, most of St Mary Cray, part of St Paul's Cray and part of West Wickham. The area of the new urban district was re-constituted as a single civil parish called Orpington; as an urban parish it had no parish council, with Orpington Urban District Council being the lowest level representative body.

The urban district was within the Metropolitan Police District and part of the review area of the Royal Commission on Local Government in Greater London. In 1965 it was abolished by the London Government Act 1963 and its former area transferred to Greater London from Kent. Its former area was combined with that of other districts to form the London Borough of Bromley.

== See also ==
- 1962 Orpington Urban District Council election
