= Ruxley Gravel Pits =

Protected area in London, England

Coordinates: 51.410°N 0.117°E

- Site of Special Scientific Interest
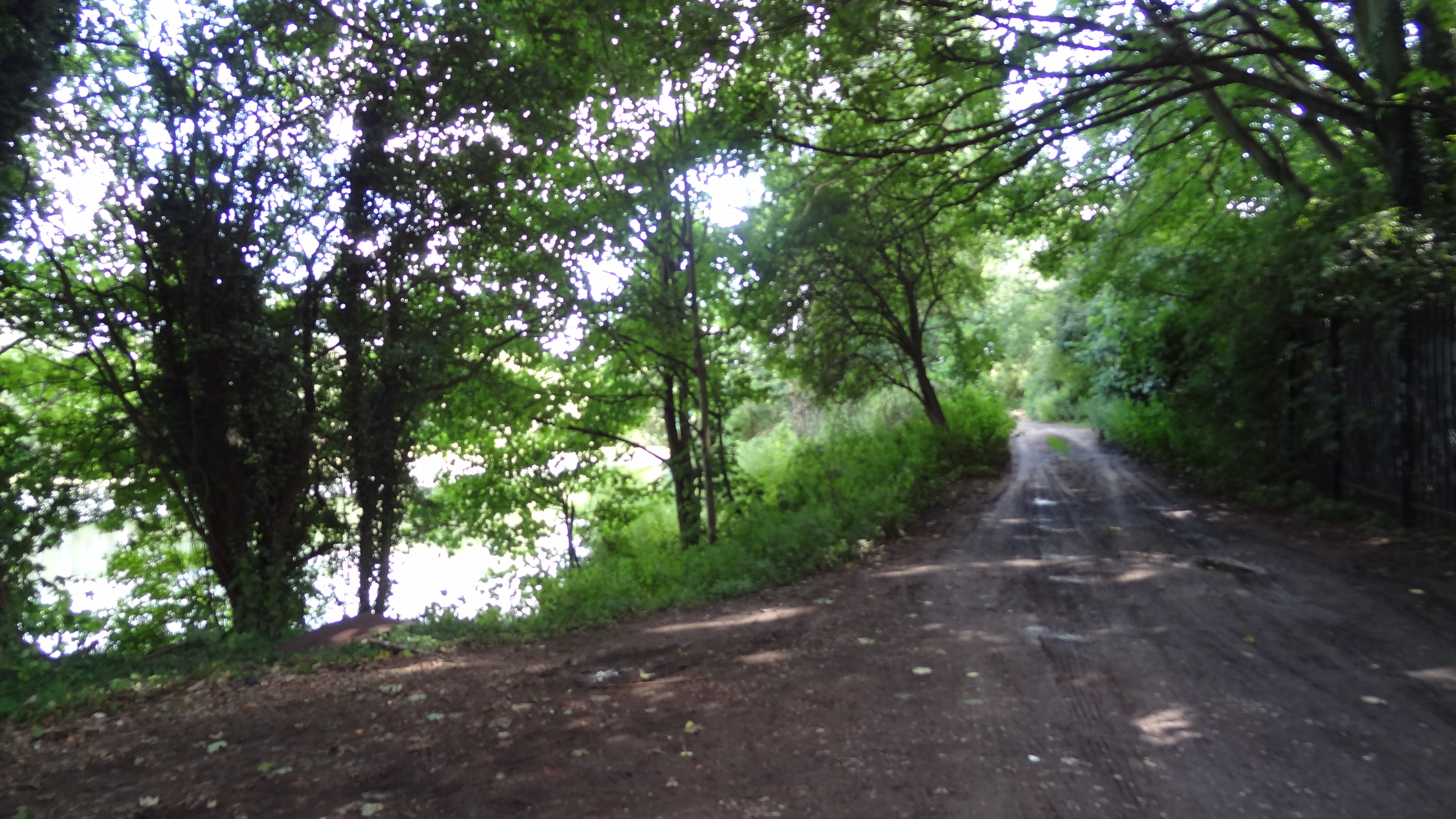
- Ruxley Gravel Pits viewed from Edgington Way
- Location of Ruxley Gravel Pits.
- Area of search: Greater London
- Grid reference: TQ474700
- Interest: Biological
- Area: 18.7 ha (46 acres)
- Notification date: 1985
- Location map: Magic Map

Ruxley Gravel Pits is an 18.7-hectare (46-acre) biological Site of Special Scientific Interest in Ruxley, Orpington, in the London Borough of Bromley, and originally dug between 1929 and 1951. It is also a Site of Metropolitan Importance for Nature Conservation. It is owned by the Environment Agency and managed by Kent Wildlife Trust. Natural England has assessed its condition as "unfavourable recovering".

The site comprises four gravel pits, and the River Cray runs through three of them, while the fourth is fed by springs. Gravel extraction took place from 1929 to 1951, and once it ceased the pits attracted many species of birds and a diverse range of plants. In 1975 the site was designated an SSSI.

Over 500 species of vascular plants and 169 of birds have been recorded, including song thrush, reed bunting, kingfisher and skylark. Fifty-three of the bird species are breeding. Insects include 23 species of butterfly, 9 dragonfly and over 500 beetles. This variety reflects the diversity of habitat: wooded islands, fringes of mature trees, scrub, fen and open water. Vegetation on the banks include the rare club rush Schoenoplectus tabernaemontani. The open water areas have rafts of yellow and white water-lily.

Access to the site is reserved to members of the Orpington and District Angling Society and permit holders. It is closed to members of the public.

== See also ==
- List of Sites of Special Scientific Interest in Greater London
