= 1962 Orpington Urban District Council election =

1962 UK local government election

1962 Orpington Council election
← 1961	10 May 1962	1963 →

12 councillors to Orpington Council
	First party	Second party	Third party
Party	Liberal	Conservative	Labour
Seats won	9	3	0
Seat change	▲6	▼5	▼1
Majority party before election
Conservative Party (UK)
Majority party after election
Liberal Party (UK)

Orpington's 1962 municipal elections were held on 10 May 1962. One third of the council was up for election. The elections took place just under two months after the Liberals had won the 1962 Orpington by-election.

== Election result ==
Orpington local election result 1962
Party	Seats	Gains	Losses	Net gain/loss	Seats %	Votes %	Votes	+/−
Liberal	9	+6	0	+6	66.66	52.52	13,694	+20.73
Conservative	3	0	5	-5	33.33	37.93	9,891	-18.06
Labour	0	0	1	-1	0.00	9.55	2,491	-2.66

The Liberal share of the vote matched that achieved in the Orpington by-election two months earlier. The result had the following consequences for the total number of seats on the council after the elections:

Party	Previous council		New council	
Party	Cllr	Ald	Cllr	Ald
Liberals	13	-	18	-
Conservative	18	-	14	-
Labour	2	-	1	-
Total	33	-	33	-
Total	33		33	

The Conservatives lost their majority and went into opposition. The Liberals won a majority taking control of the council for the first time.

== Ward results ==
Biggin Hill
Party	Candidate	Votes	%	±%
Liberal	Alfred Baldock Howard	932	50.93	−0.96
Conservative		821	44.86	+0.87
Labour		77	4.21	+0.09
Majority		111	6.07	−1.83
Turnout		1,830		
Liberal hold		Swing	-0.91	

Crofton North
Party	Candidate	Votes	%	±%
Liberal	Lois Wiggins	1,180	46.84	+1.60
Conservative	FS Hockey	1,073	42.60	−6.43
Labour		266	10.56	+4.83
Majority		107	4.24	
Turnout		2,519		
Liberal gain from Conservative		Swing	+4.01	

Crofton South
Party	Candidate	Votes	%	±%
Liberal	Thomas J Flawn	2,438	56.80	+30.61
Conservative	Mrs FG Gardner	1,615	37.63	−24.06
Labour		239	5.57	−6.55
Majority		823	19.17	
Turnout		4,292		
Liberal gain from Conservative		Swing	+27.33	

Downe
Party	Candidate	Votes	%	±%
Liberal	Edward Charles Henry Jones			
Liberal	Donald S Kerr			
Conservative				
Conservative				
Labour				
Labour				
Majority				
Turnout				
Liberal hold		Swing		
Liberal gain from Independent		Swing		

Includes by-election caused by the resignation of Councillor Eric Lubbock.

Farnborough
Party	Candidate	Votes	%	±%
Conservative	Mrs Sheila M Stead	861	50.50	−11.22
Liberal		756	44.34	+15.24
Labour		88	5.16	−4.02
Majority		105	6.16	−26.46
Turnout		1,705		
Conservative hold		Swing	-13.23	

Goddington South
Party	Candidate	Votes	%	±%
Liberal	C Robert Rayner	2,127	66.47	+16.62
Conservative		872	27.25	−17.41
Labour		201	6.28	+0.79
Majority		1,255	39.22	+34.03
Turnout		3,200		
Liberal hold		Swing	+17.01	

Green Street Green
Party	Candidate	Votes	%	±%
Liberal	E James Norman	1,701	54.94	
Conservative	LF Hendy	1,114	35.98	
Labour		281	9.08	
Majority		587	18.96	
Turnout		3,096		
Liberal gain from Conservative		Swing		

Knockholt
Party	Candidate	Votes	%	±%
Conservative	Douglas Arthur Scollick			
Liberal	Brian Armstrong			
Labour				
Majority				
Turnout				
Conservative hold		Swing		

Knoll
Party	Candidate	Votes	%	±%
Liberal	Michael Edwardes-Evans	1,180	50.30	
Conservative	Michael John Aylmore Stevens	959	40.88	
Labour		207	8.82	
Majority		221	9.42	
Turnout		2,346		
Liberal gain from Conservative		Swing		

Petts Wood
Party	Candidate	Votes	%	±%
Conservative	Bernard Douglas Woodmansee	1,591	52.32	
Liberal		1,287	42.32	
Labour		163	5.36	
Majority		304	10.00	
Turnout		3,041		
Conservative hold		Swing		

Poverest
Party	Candidate	Votes	%	±%
Liberal	Ernest James Lovell	1,373	52.57	+30.07
Labour	James Thomas Harris	885	33.88	−9.34
Conservative		354	13.55	−20.72
Majority		488	18.69	
Turnout		2,612		
Liberal gain from Labour		Swing	+19.70	
