= The Bull Inn, St Paul's Cray =

Pub in St Paul's Cray, London

The Bull Inn
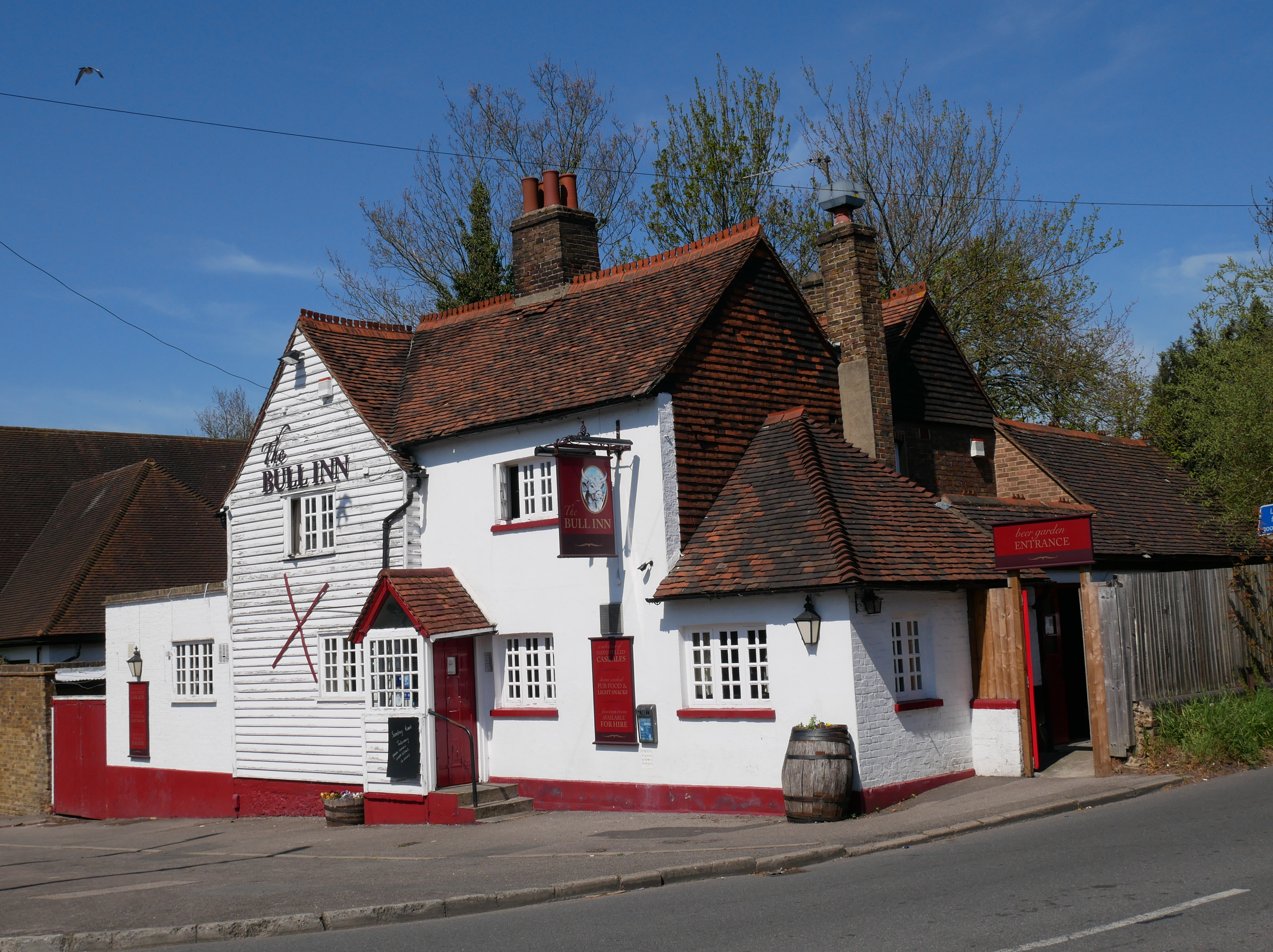
- The Bull

- Location within London Borough of Bromley Location within Greater London

General information
- Location: Main Road, St Paul's Cray, London Borough of Bromley, London, England
- Coordinates: 51.403379°N 0.118484°E

Design and construction
- Designations

Listed Building – Grade II
- Official name: The Bull Public House
- Designated: 29 June 1973
- Reference no.: 1031802

The Bull Inn is a pub on Main Road, St Paul's Cray, London Borough of Bromley.

It is a Grade II listed building, dating back to the 18th century.
