= Bromley Rural District =

Former local government area in the UK

Coordinates: 51.4°N 0.1°E

Bromley
- Area
  - 1911: 28,839 acres (117 km^{2})
  - 1931: 28,839 acres (117 km^{2})
- Population
  - 1901: 18,808
  - 1931: 39,730
- History
  - Created: 1894
  - Abolished: 1934
  - Succeeded by: Orpington Urban District, Chislehurst and Sidcup Urban District, Municipal Borough of Bromley, Municipal Borough of Beckenham
- Status: Rural district
  - HQ: Municipal Buildings, Bromley

Bromley was a rural district in north-west Kent, England from 1894 to 1934. Its area now forms part of the London Borough of Bromley in Greater London. It did not include the main settlement of the same name, which constituted the Municipal Borough of Bromley. Mottingham formed an exclave of the district.

It was created under the Local Government Act 1894 based on the existing Bromley rural sanitary district. It initially consisted of fifteen civil parishes:

- Chelsfield
- Chislehurst
- Cudham
- Downe
- Farnborough
- Foots Cray
- Hayes
- Keston
- Knockholt
- Mottingham
- North Cray
- Orpington
- St Mary Cray
- St Paul's Cray
- West Wickham

== Boundary changes and abolition ==
Within a few years of its creation, the rural district was reduced in size and population when two of the constituent civil parishes became separate urban districts. Chislehurst became an urban district in 1900, followed by Foot's Cray in 1902 (later renamed Sidcup Urban District in 1921).

The Local Government Act 1929 put in place a new procedure for the alteration of county districts, and due to increased urbanisation it became clear that the rural district was unlikely to continue to exist. Applications were made by Chislehurst Urban District Council to absorb the parishes of Mottingham, North Cray, St Mary Cray and St Paul's Cray, along with Sidcup UD. Beckenham Urban District Council entered into negotiations with West Wickham Parish Council to absorb the parish, while Bromley Borough Council sought to annex the parishes of Hayes and Keston. Bromley Rural District Council countered by making an application to be converted into an urban district, although they were prepared to cede Mottingham to Chislehurst UD. Public inquiries were held at Beckenham and Orpington in October 1929 into the proposed changes.

The district's abolition was carried out by the Kent Review Order 1934, which came into effect on 1 April:

- Hayes and about half of Keston became part of the Borough of Bromley
- Mottingham, North Cray and St Paul's Cray passed to the enlarged Chislehurst and Sidcup Urban District.
- West Wickham was transferred to Beckenham Urban District.
- The remainder of the rural district (Chelsfield, Cudham, Downe, Farnborough, part of Keston, Knockholt, Orpington and St Mary Cray) was reconstituted as Orpington Urban District.
