= Chislehurst and Sidcup Urban District =

Former local government area in the UK

Coordinates: 51°25′N 0°5′E

Chislehurst and Sidcup
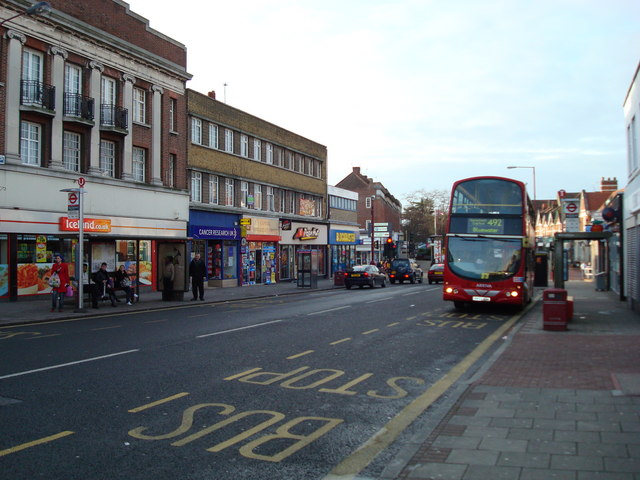
- Interactive map of Chislehurst and Sidcup
- Area
  - 1951: 8,959 acres (36.3 km^{2})
  - 1961: 8,959 acres (36.3 km^{2})
- Population
  - 1931: 20,493 (equivalent area)
  - 1961: 86,892
- History
  - Created: 1934
  - Abolished: 1965
  - Succeeded by: London Borough of Bexley; London Borough of Bromley
- Status: Urban district, civil parish
- Government: Chislehurst and Sidcup Urban District Council
  - HQ: Sidcup Place

Chislehurst and Sidcup Urban District was a local government district and civil parish in north west Kent, England, from 1934 to 1965. It was formed in 1934 from the former area of Chislehurst Urban District, Sidcup Urban District and part of Bromley Rural District.

== History ==
The district was formed as an amalgamation, as part of a county review order following the Local Government Act 1929. It comprised the entirety of the former urban districts of Chislehurst and Sidcup and, from Bromley Rural District, the former parishes of Mottingham, North Cray, St Paul's Cray and part of St Mary Cray. (Note: The greater part of St Mary Cray in terms of population and area went to Orpington. An unpopulated area of 14 acres (5.7 ha) was gained from Orpington.) The merger of the Chislehurst and Sidcup districts was supported by the two councils. At the enquiry on 27 July 1932, the merger was opposed by the Sidcup ratepayers' association, the North Cray parish council and individual members of the two urban district councils. One of the benefits of the merger was uniting the village of Foots Cray, previously split between three districts. It was suggested by Hilton Young, Minister of Health, that a single name would be preferable, but this was not enforced.

== London boroughs ==
In 1965 the parish and urban district were abolished and the settlements split again, roughly by the A20 road. Chislehurst became part of the London Borough of Bromley while Sidcup and North Cray formed part of the London Borough of Bexley in Greater London.
