= St Botolph's Church, Ruxley =

St Botolph's
- St Botolph's Church
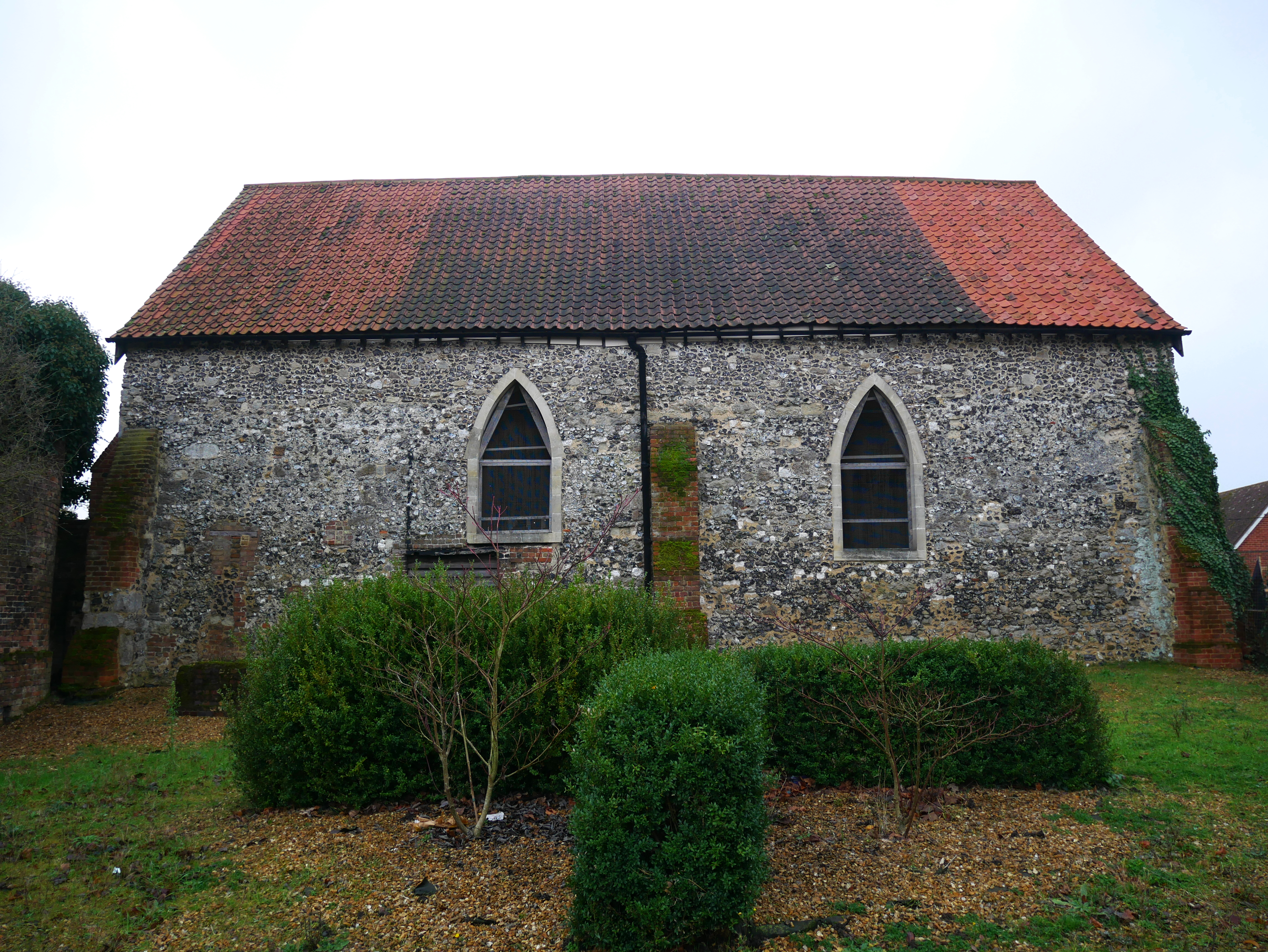
- The north face of St Botolph's Church
- St Botolph's
- 51.41175°N 0.13435°E
- OS grid reference: TQ 48528 70244
- Location: Ruxley, London Borough of Bromley, DA14
- Country: England

History
- Status: Deconsecrated (1557)

Architecture
- Heritage designation: Grade II listed building Scheduled monument
- Years built: 13th century
- Closed: 1557

Administration
- Parish: Ruxley (before 1557 deconsecration), Hundred of Ruxley, Lathe of Sutton at Hone, Kent (North Cray after 1557)

St Botolph's Church is a church building in Ruxley, in the London Borough of Bromley, southeast London, England. It was constructed in the thirteenth century and dedicated to Botwulf of Thorney. St Botolph's was used as a church for around 300 years but was deconsecrated in 1557. The church was then used a farm building for over 400 years and the remains of an oast house are still adjacent to it. In the 1960s archaeological work was carried out on the site and found evidence of an older wooden building, suggesting there may have been an older Saxon church in the same location. Today the church is a Grade II listed building and a scheduled monument on the grounds of Ruxley Manor Garden Centre, although many features are still intact, the church is in disrepair and English Heritage have agreed to pay a grant to help preserve the building.

== Location ==
Today St Botolph's Church is located to the east of Ruxley Wood, on the grounds of Ruxley Manor Garden Centre, within Ruxley, in the northeast corner of the London Borough of Bromley, just south of the border with the London Borough of Bexley. The church is south of and accessed from Maidstone Road, part of the B2173 road, and north of Sidcup Bypass, part of the A20 road. It is also around 500 m (550 yd) southeast of Ruxley Corner roundabout where Edgington Way and North Cray Road, part of the A223 road connect. The 233 bus, operated by Go Ahead London for Transport for London, serves the bus stops along Maidstone Road, on its journey from Eltham to Swanley passing through Ruxley.

== History ==
Archaeological work was carried out in the 1960s found evidence of an older wooden building on the site, suggesting there may have been an older Saxon church in the same location. Ruxley was recorded in the Domesday Book of 1086, as a settlement in the Hundred of Helmestrei, within the Lathe of Sutton at Hone. By at least the late thirteenth century, the name Helmestrei was no longer in use, and the hundred came to be known as Hundred of Ruxley taking its new name from the settlement of Ruxley, which was the meeting place of the hundred, located on the main road, which passed through it. The Current church building was constructed in the thirteenth century, and dedicated to Botwulf of Thorney. The church was in use for around 300 years but in 1557 it was deconsecrated by Cardinal Reginald Pole , when the parish of Ruxley was abolished and the land and population absorbed into North Cray parish to the north. The church was used as a farm building for over 400 years to store agricultural equipment.

Today the church is a Grade II listed building and a scheduled monument on the grounds of Ruxley Manor Garden Centre, and is owned by the Evans family. Although many features are still intact, including the majority of the roof, the church is in disrepair, and appears as "remains of church" on Ordnance Survey maps. English Heritage have agreed to pay a grant of £35,000 of the estimated £62,000 needed for structural work on the building to help preserve it.

== Gallery ==
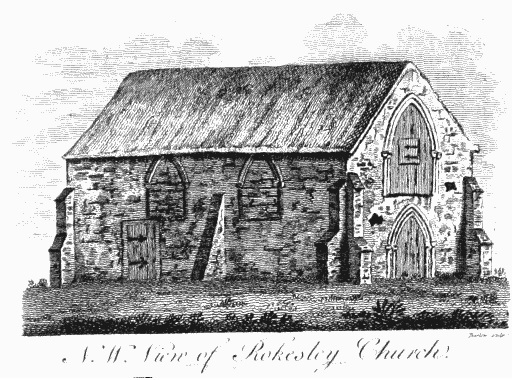
"N.W. view of Rokesley Church" Engraving of St Botolph's Church, Ruxley, appearing in The History and Topographical Survey of the County of Kent: Volume 2. by Edward Hasted (1797)

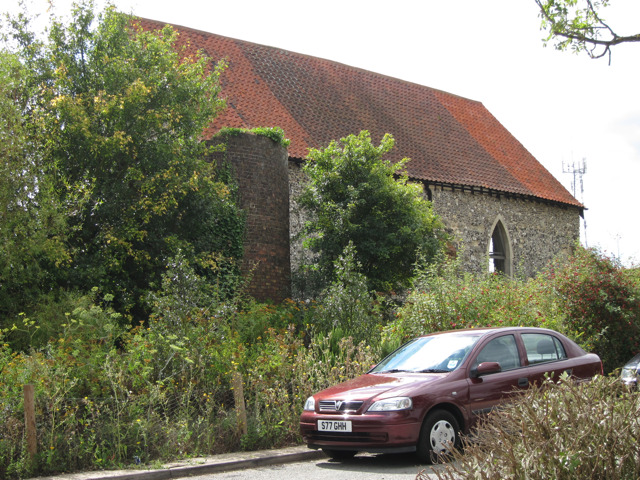
Church and oast house, August 2001

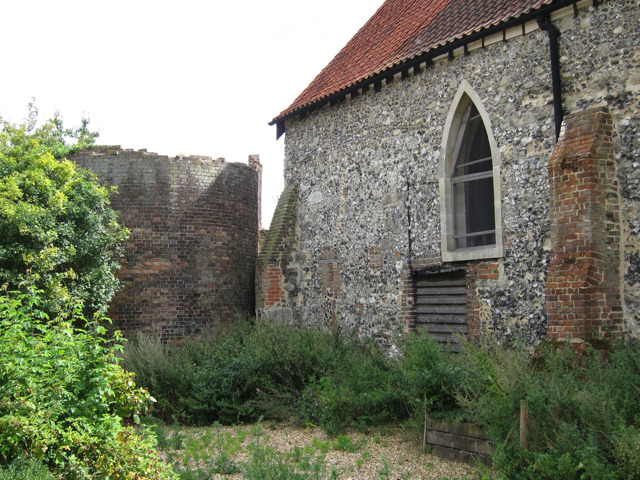

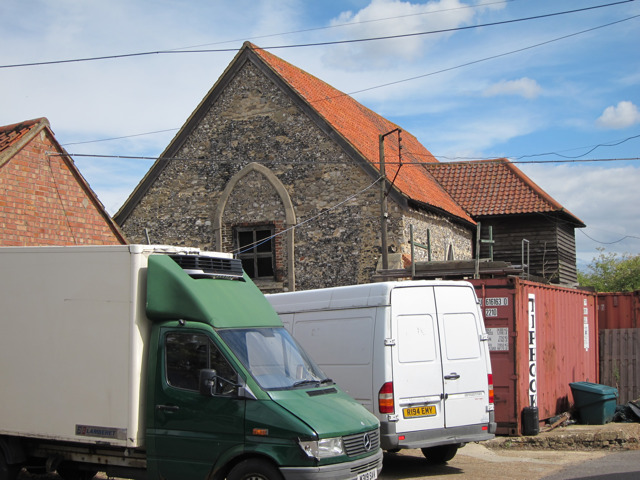

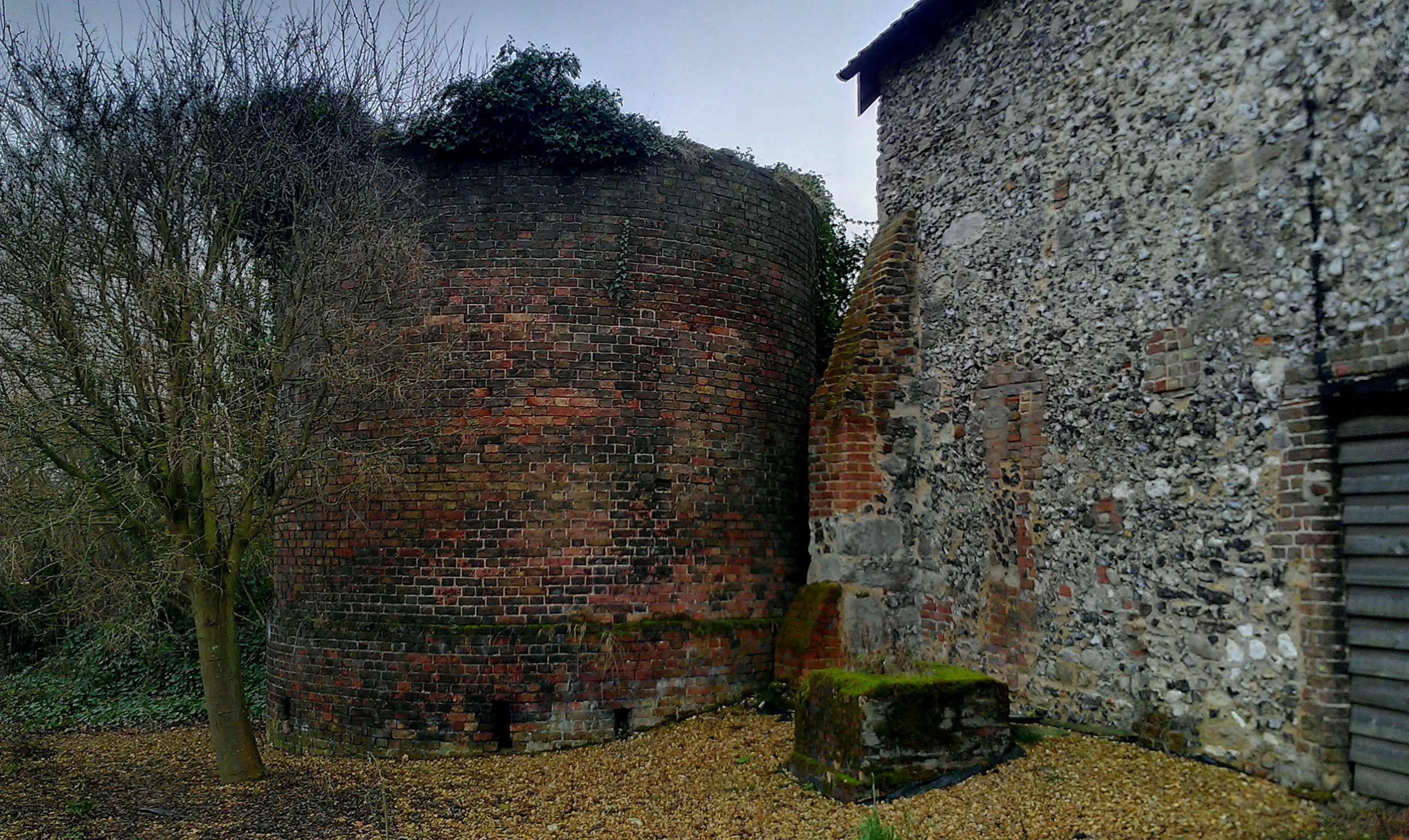

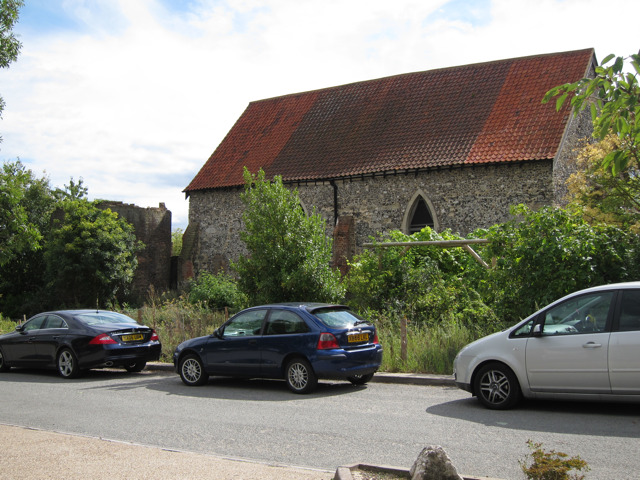
