= St Mary Cray =

Area of south-east London, England

Coordinates: 51.3920°N 0.1080°E

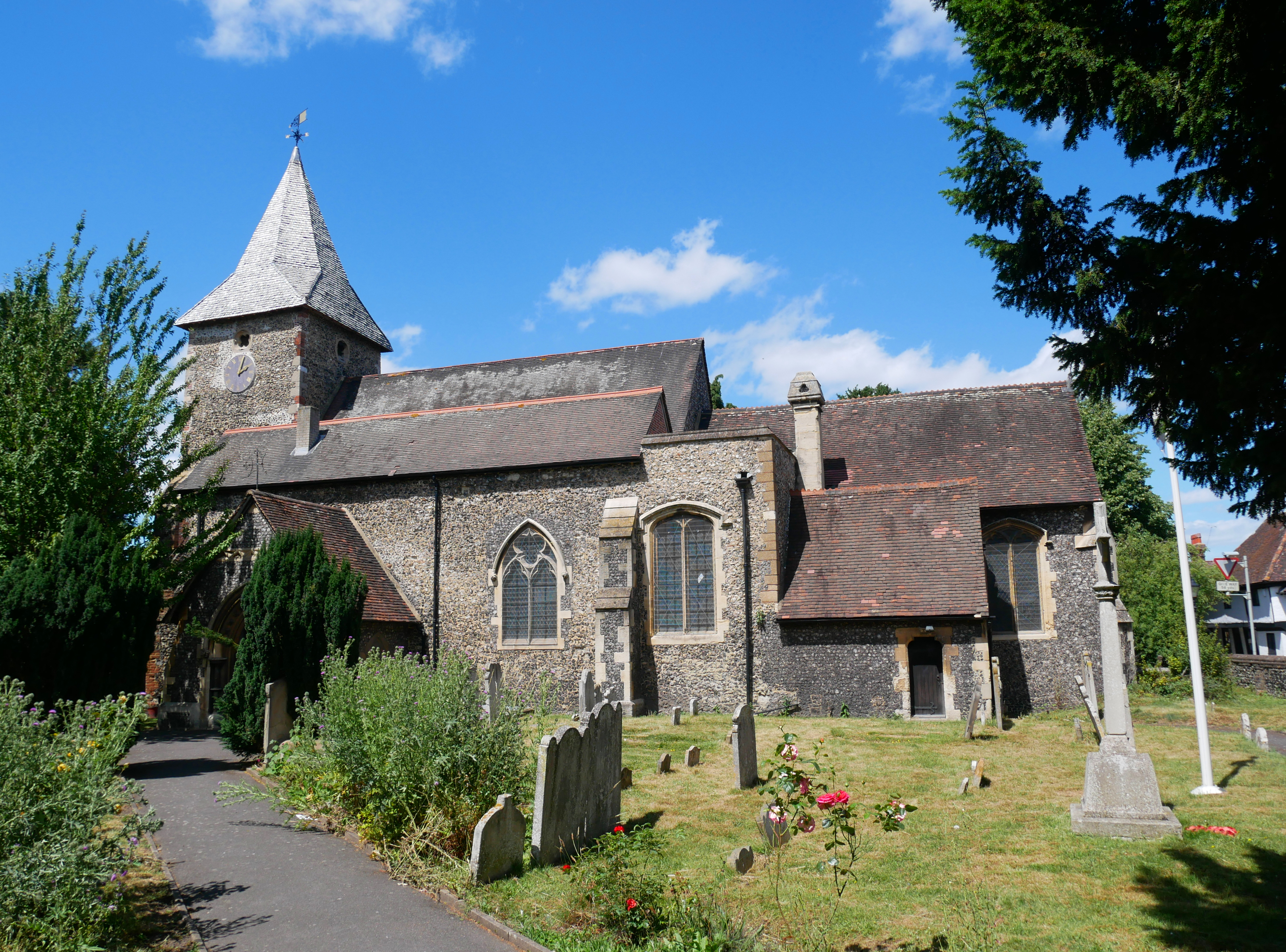
- The Church of St Mary in St Mary Cray

- Location within Greater London
- OS grid reference: TQ466680
  - Charing Cross: 13 mi (21 km) NW
- London borough: Bromley
- Ceremonial county: Greater London
- Region: London
- Country: England
- Sovereign state: United Kingdom
- Post town: ORPINGTON
- Postcode district: BR5
- Dialling code: 01689
- Police: Metropolitan
- Fire: London
- Ambulance: London
- UK Parliament: Orpington
- London Assembly: Bexley and Bromley

St Mary Cray is a suburb of Orpington within the London Borough of Bromley, Greater London. Historically it was a market town in the county of Kent. It is located north of Orpington town centre, and 13 miles (21 km) south-east of Charing Cross.

== History ==
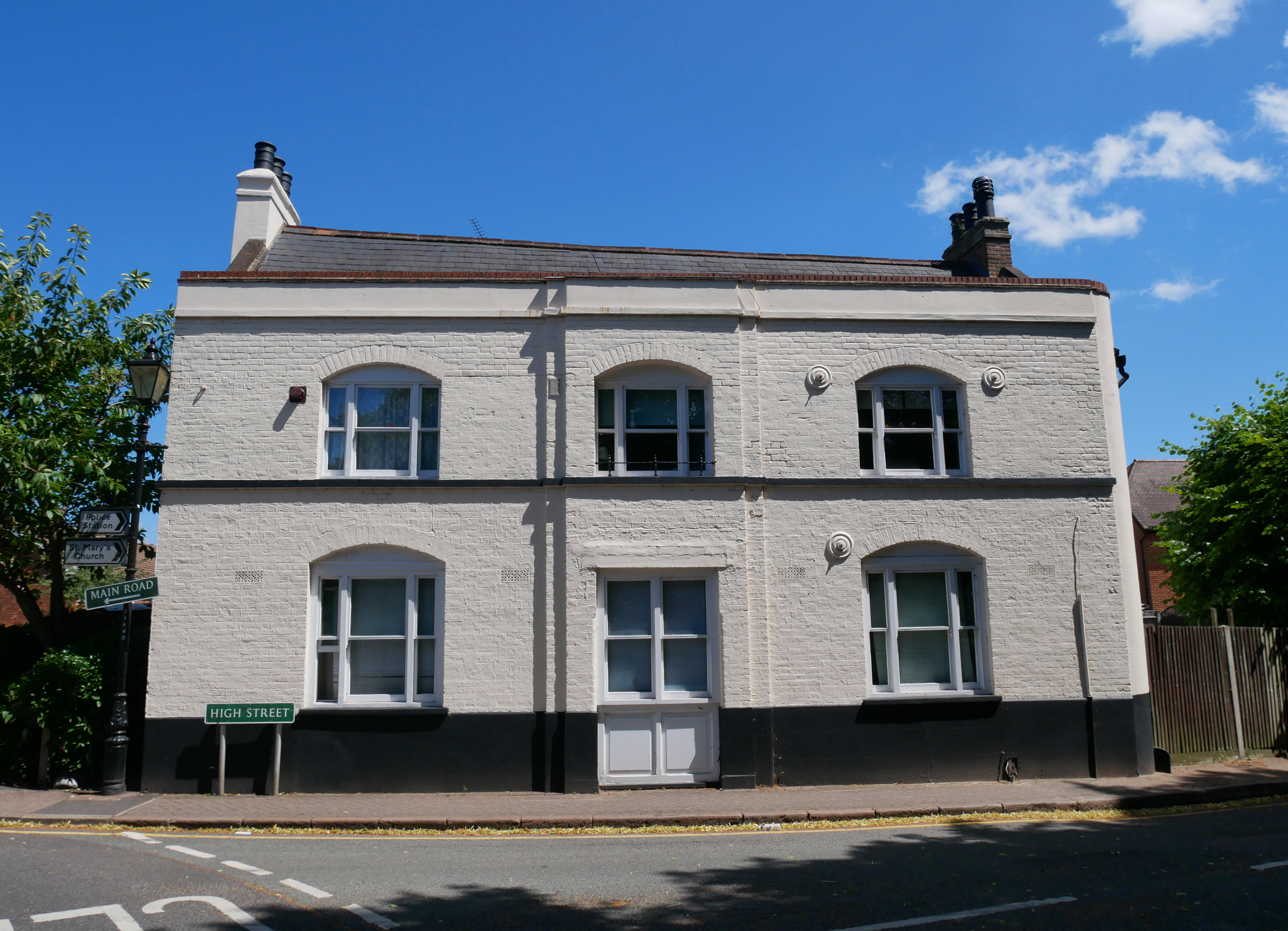
Building that formerly housed the Blue Anchor, a pub with fifteenth-century origins

The name Cray possibly derives from the Anglo-Saxon crecca, meaning brook or rivulet, though it also relates to the Welsh word craie, meaning fresh water. The name may also derive from the Latin word creta, meaning chalk, as the River Cray flows over a chalk bed. The village name derives from the dedication of the parish church to the Blessed Virgin Mary.

Roman and Saxon remains have been found in the Fordcroft area. An excavation in 1960 was conducted by members of Bromley Museum in Orpington. Members of the Orpington and District Archaeological Society (ODAS) have excavated further sites that have become available.

St Mary Cray developed into a market town. The privilege of holding a market on Wednesdays was granted by Edward I (1272 - 1307).

The district being an agricultural one, the small population worked on its many fruit farms and hopfields.

The most famous of the early industries were the 17th-century foundries of Hodson and Hull where several famous bells were cast. Christopher Hodson made bells for Canterbury Cathedral and Oxford.

The advent of the Industrial Revolution saw brewing and paper manufacturing grow into principal industries beside the River Cray. Three mills are mentioned in Domesday (1087). From the early 1800s until the Depression in the 1930s, many local workers were employed at the Joynson and the William Nash paper mills.

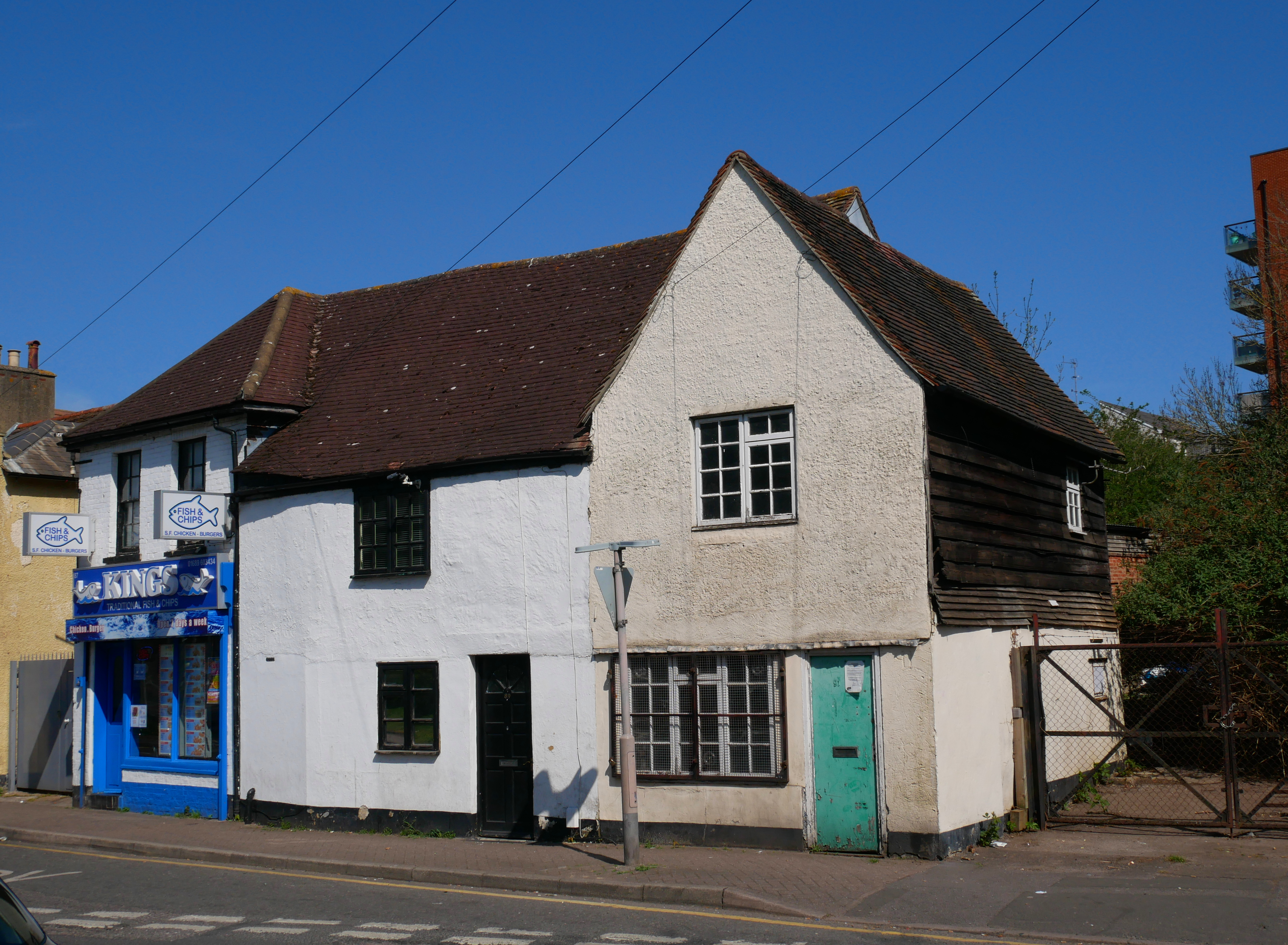
91 High Street, a building with possible sixteenth-century origins

With the expansion of the railways, the population increased rapidly. The building of the railway viaduct across the Cray Valley is considered to be the origin in 1860 of Cray Wanderers F.C. who are London's oldest association football club. Migrant workers came to the district to help construct the giant earth embankments for what became the London, Chatham & Dover Railway. Games of football started at Star Lane, today the site of a cemetery.

In the 1930s the farmlands of Poverest on the west side of the river were turned over to the construction of industrial and office buildings. The factories along Cray Avenue were engaged in industries ranging from paint and ink manufacture to baking and preserved foods.

During and after the Second World War, Star Lane cemetery was to become the burial ground for several airmen of the RAF and Commonwealth Air Forces. Three Polish airmen were also buried here, one of them being Stanisław Grodzicki, who was killed in an air crash over Croydon.

In 1971 the St Mary Cray Action Group was founded. It erected a new village sign, at Sandway, in 1992. John Horam, then the MP for Orpington, recorded in 1999: "The Crays are truly a slice of Kent, on the edge of London, once rural, now full of housing and commerce."

== Notable events ==
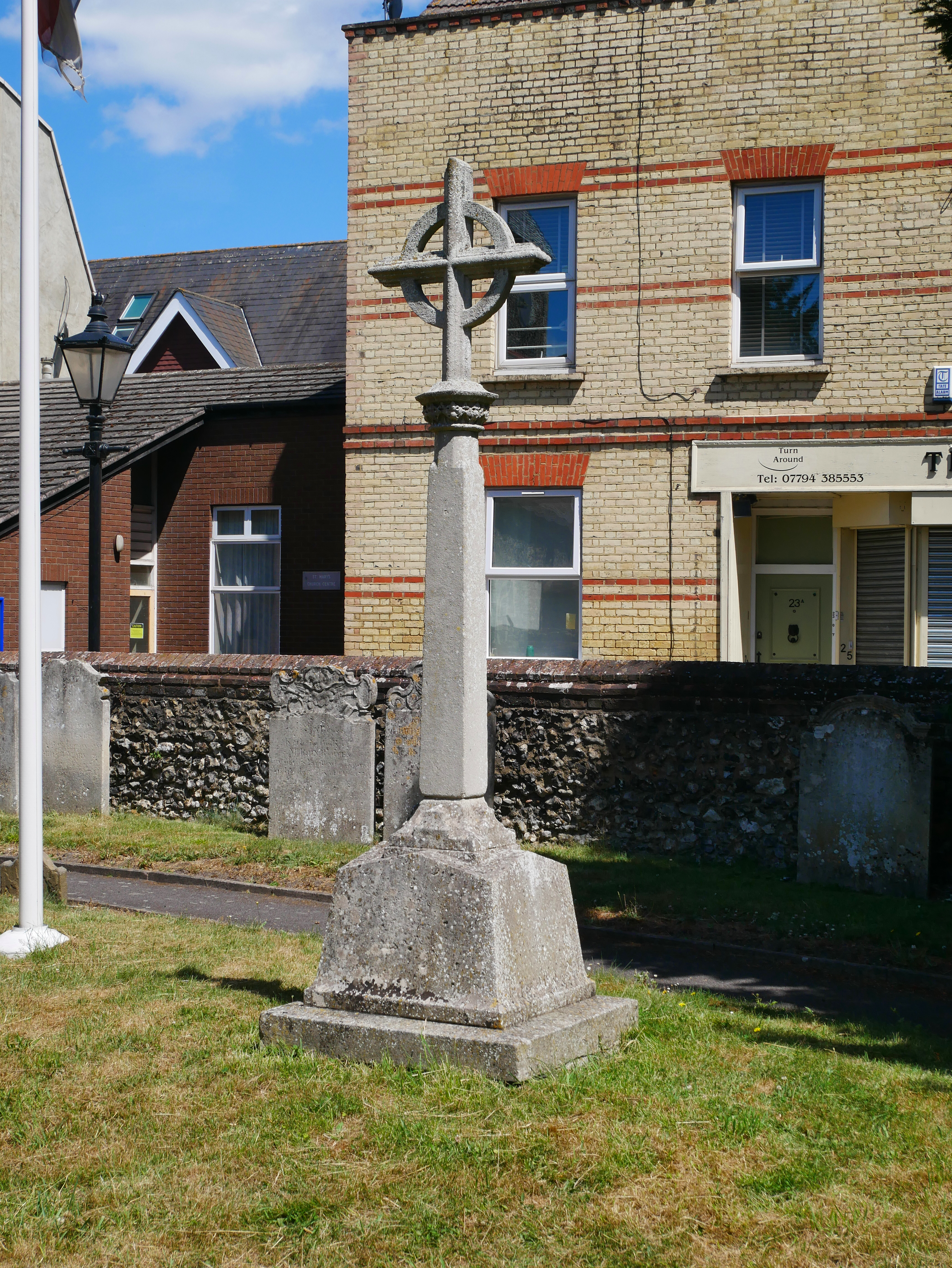
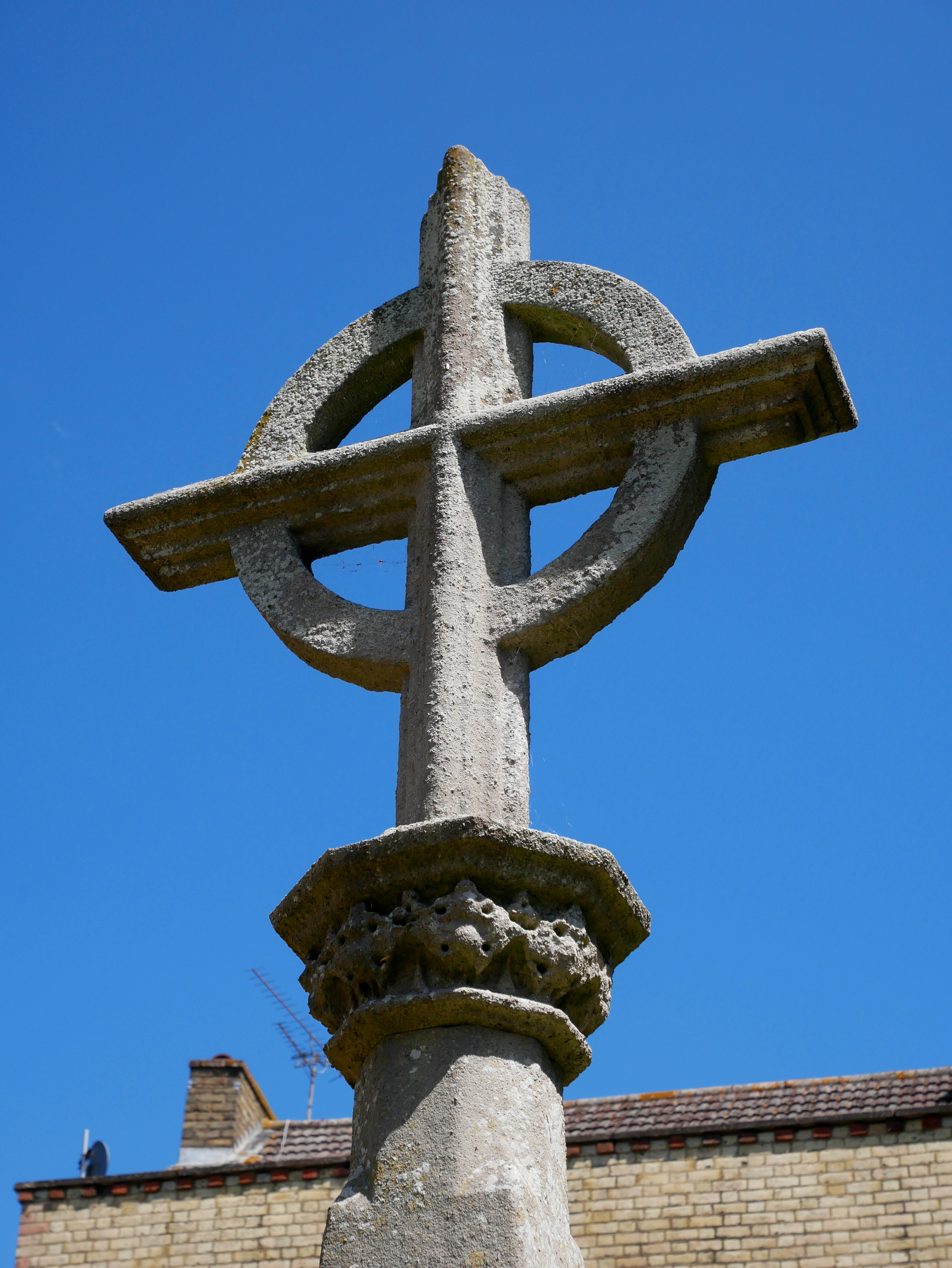
The twentieth-century war memorial in St Mary Cray, now a Grade II listed structure

=== Cray Wanderers FC ===
St Mary Cray was the original home of Cray Wanderers FC, claimed to have been having been formed in 1860, which may be the oldest football club in London.

=== The Romany ===
St Mary Cray has the largest settled Romani groups community in the UK. In the past, hop and soft fruit farms in the area employed large numbers of itinerant workers.

=== Battle of St Mary Cray ===
On Saturday 24 April 1954 a clash between Teddy Boys or Edwardians, as they were then known, attracted attention. The Orpington & Kentish Times had the headline: "Gang Battle" at Railway Station: Edwardian Youths in Half-Hour Fight: Wooden Stakes, Sand-Filled Socks as Weapons". The two gangs were from Downham and St Paul's Cray, and sported stovepipe trousers, crepe shoes and drape jackets. Trouble had started earlier in the evening when a "rowdy" party of youths and a few girls from Downham Estate, Bromley, arrived at St Paul's Cray Community Centre, where a dance was being held. The paper reported "a knife was drawn when a member of the band objected to being jostled", and "a man had a glass of orange juice thrown in his face during an exchange of words." The MC, George Couchman said: "I warned the crowd police were standing by and also took the precaution of the band playing calming music – no quicksteps." The crowd dispersed at 11 o'clock, but a fight broke out at the local station, and 40 youths were held over night.

=== Local government ===
St Mary Cray was an ancient parish in the county of Kent. It formed part of the Bromley Rural District from 1894, on 1 April 1934 the parish was abolished and merged with Orpington and became part of the Orpington Urban District, part of the parish also went to form Chislehurst and Sidcup. At the 1931 census (the last before the abolition of the parish), St Mary Cray had a population of 2155. The Orpington Urban District was abolished in 1965 and the area became part of the London Borough of Bromley in Greater London.

St Mary Cray is represented by the St Mary Cray ward which elects three councillors to Bromley London Borough Council.

== Retail ==
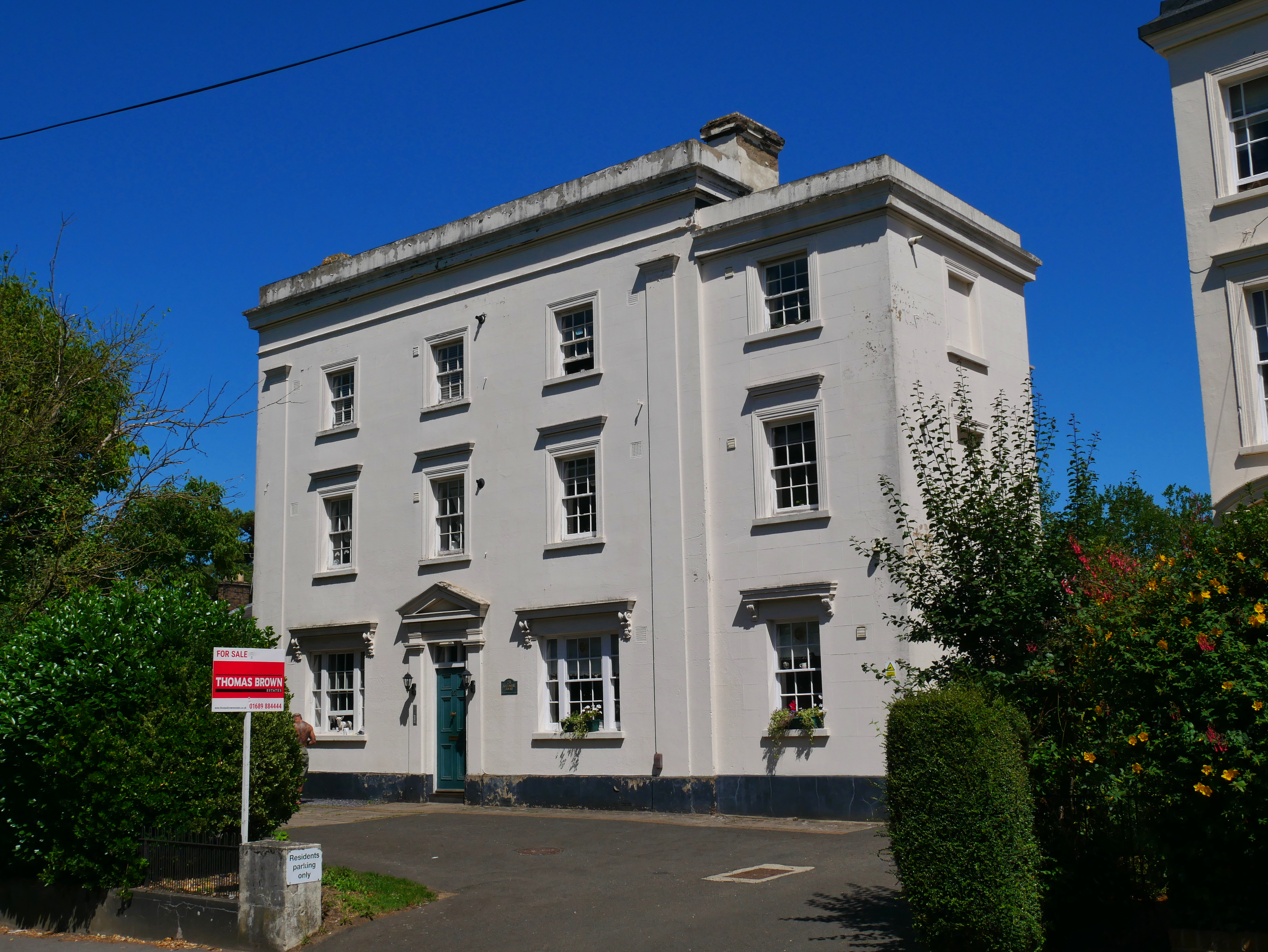
The nineteenth-century 231 High Street in St Mary Cray

Like nearby St Paul's Cray, it has been somewhat overshadowed by the growth of Orpington, which now provides local communities with their main shopping and business facilities. Today it is mostly suburban housing, to a large amount of working class and ex traveller people. Originally the main feature of the town was its small parade of shops which was once longer than Orpington High Street. Today, it is the Nugents Retail Park on Cray Avenue which include several large stores including Marks and Spencers and Next.

However, before Nugents opened, the industrial estates of both St Mary Cray and St Paul's Cray were a dominant feature on Cray Avenue and Sevenoaks Way. Many of these grew as part of the new 'light electrical industries' which were springing up. Throughout the 1950s, the area now known as The Nugent housed two large Morphy Richards factories. Their business began in the small factory which used to be by the railway embankment, on the opposite side of the road. They eventually moved out of the area in the 1960s. The art deco tower of the Allied Bakery, formerly Tip Top Bakeries, is a local landmark. Just along from the bakery is Lagoon Road, so named because in the 1930s there was an outdoor lido called the Blue Lagoon.

== Nearby areas ==
St Mary Cray borders St Paul's Cray to the north west and north, Swanley to the north east, Crockenhill to the east, Orpington to the south east, south and south west, and Petts Wood to the west.

== Transport ==
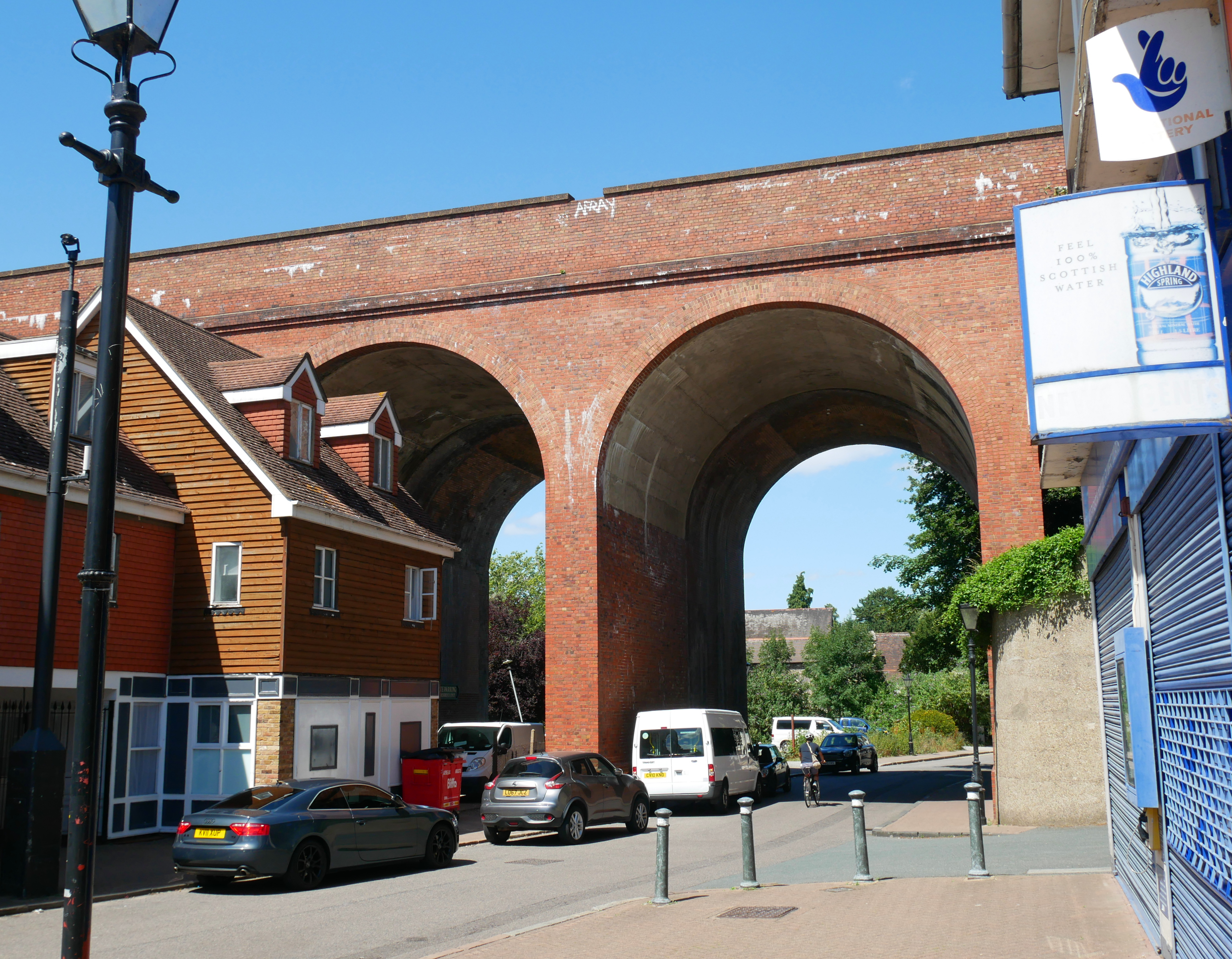
Railway arch passing through St Mary Cray

=== Rail ===
St Mary Cray station connects the area with Southeastern services to London Victoria, Ashford International via Maidstone East and to Gillingham, as well as Thameslink services to London Blackfriars via Catford and to Sevenoaks.

=== Buses ===
- 51 to Woolwich via St Pauls Cray, Foots Cray, Sidcup, Blackfen, Welling & Plumstead Common OR to Orpington. Operated by Go-Ahead London for London Buses.
- 273 to Lewisham via St Pauls Cray, Chislehurst, Mottingham, Grove Park, Horn Park, Lee & Hither Green OR to Petts Wood via Poverest. Operated by Stagecoach London for London Buses.
- 477 to Dartford via Crockenhill, Swanley, Hextable & Wilmington OR to Orpington. Operated by Kent Country.
- N199 to Trafalgar Square via Orpington, Petts Wood, Bromley, Downham, Bellingham, Catford, Ladywell, Lewisham, Greenwich, Deptford, Surrey Quays, Canada Water, Bermondsey, London Bridge & Aldwych. Night service. Operated by Stagecoach London for London Buses.
- B14 to Bexleyheath via St Pauls Cray, Sidcup, Albany Park & Blendon OR to Orpington. Operated by Stagecoach London for London Buses.
- R1 to St Pauls Cray OR to Green Street Green via Orpington & Chelsfield. Operated by Go-Ahead London for London Buses.
- R3 to Locksbottom via Poverest & Petts Wood OR to Orpington. Operated by Go-Ahead London for London Buses.
- R4 to Pauls Cray Hill OR to Locksbottom via Orpington & Farnborough. Operated by Go-Ahead London for London Buses.
- R6 to Orpington. Operated by Go-Ahead London for London Buses.
- R11 to Sidcup via St Pauls Cray & Foots Cray OR to Green Street Green via Orpington. Operated by Go-Ahead London for London Buses.

== Notable people ==
- Allan Octavian Hume (1829–1912) - notable ornithologist and founder of the Indian National Congress, born in St Mary Cray.
