= St Paul's Cray =

Coordinates: 51.3998°N 0.1067°E

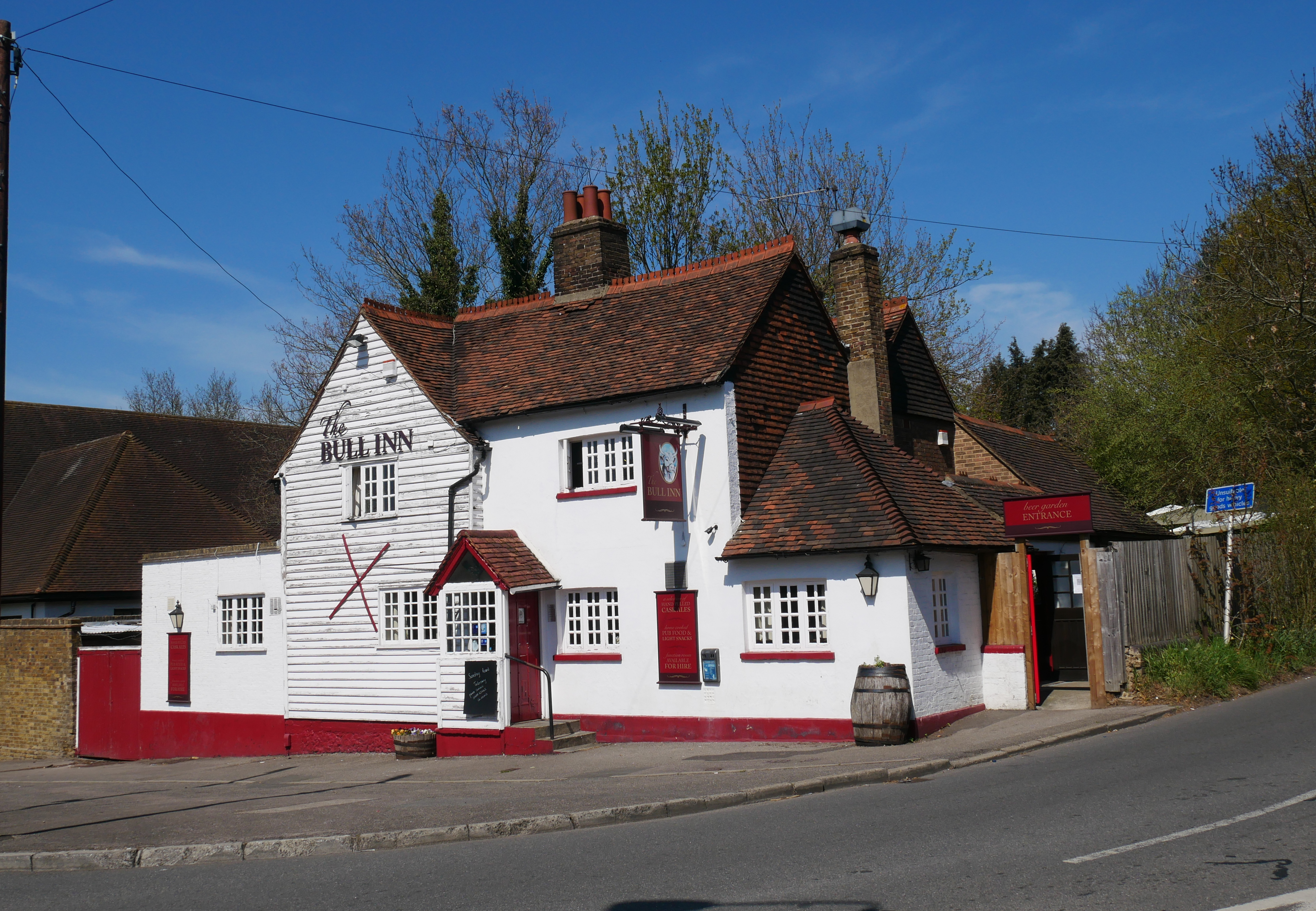
- The Bull, an 18th-century pub in St Paul's Cray

- Location within Greater London
- OS grid reference: TQ466688
- London borough: Bromley
- Ceremonial county: Greater London
- Region: London
- Country: England
- Sovereign state: United Kingdom
- Post town: ORPINGTON
- Postcode district: BR5
- Dialling code: 01689; 020
- Police: Metropolitan
- Fire: London
- Ambulance: London
- UK Parliament: Orpington
- London Assembly: Bexley and Bromley

St Paul's Cray is a suburb of Orpington within the London Borough of Bromley, Greater London. Prior to 1965 it was within the historic county of Kent. It is located south of Sidcup.

== The area ==
The area includes a small parade of shops, as well as part of the industrial estate on Cray Avenue that connects to its sister St Mary Cray. The former Broomwood pub is now a McDonald's and lies on the main road. It is also home to retail outlets such as PC World, Comet, Land of Leather, Homebase, JJB Sports,Home Bargains, Lidl, Aldi, MFI, Currys, Carpetright and Arco.

== History ==
Though modern in appearance, St Paul's Cray has an ancient history. Romans camped along the banks of the river, and even earlier settlements are suggested by the mysterious dene holes, caverns shaped in the chalk, which have been found on either side of the valley. Sir Simon de Cray held the manor in the time of Edward I. He took his name from St Paul's Cray. He was knighted for his part in the Scottish wars. He became Lord Warden of the Cinque Ports in 1275.

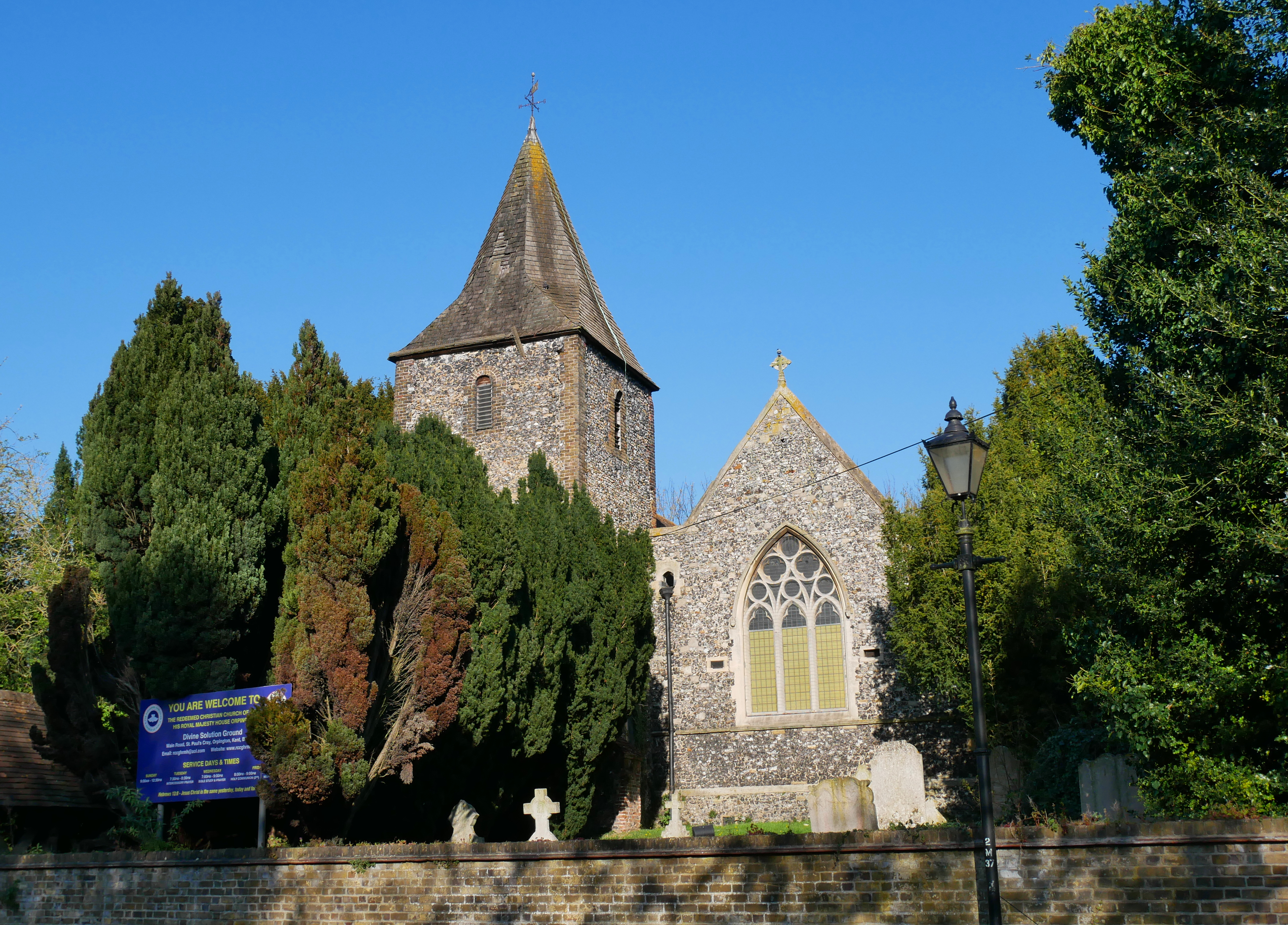
The medieval tower on the Church of St Paulinus; formerly run by the Church of England, it is now owned by the Redeemed Christian Church of God.

The name St Paul's Cray has no direct connection with St Paul the Apostle; it is simply an abbreviation of St Paulinus Cray. The 11th-century church, made redundant in 1978 but now occupied by the Redeemed Christian Church of God, is sited on Main Road on the attractive riverside section of the St Paul's Cray Conservation Area. From its structural form, it would appear to be a possibly Saxon foundation and certainly earlier than the thirteenth-century St Mary's. A rare dedication suggests that a church could have occupied the site in the early seventh century. (Paulinus was an early Christian missionary, and a close contemporary of Augustine who subsequently became Archbishop of York and Bishop of Rochester.)

The area was known in the 16th century as Paul Crey. William Camden born in 1551 writes in a 1610 travel guide in a section on Kent: "Here the riverlet Crey, anciently called Crecan, intermingleth it selfe with Darent, ? when in his short course he hath imparted his name to five townlets which hee watereth,as Saint Marie Crey, Pauls Crey, Votes-Crey, North Crey,? and Crey-ford in former ages Crecanford, where Hengest the Saxon, the eighth yeare after his arrivall, joyned battaile with the Britans, and after hee had slaine their captaines brought them under with so great a slaughter that afterwards hee never stood in feare of them, but established his kingdome quietly in Kent."

While some development has taken place on the east side of the old village, open country with a belt of woodland extends to the hamlet of Hockenden in Swanley and the borough boundary. On the west side, a large housing estate to accommodate 10,000 of London's overspill has swallowed up farm and woodland since the Second World War. This new township which extends as far west as Chislehurst Common has its own shopping centre, churches, schools, library and industrial estate. Sports facilities are found at the recreation ground, with Hoblingwell Wood to the rear. The former Walsingham School closed in 1990.

On 1 April 1934 the civil parish was abolished to form Chislehurst and Sidcup, part also went to Orpington. At the 1931 census (the last before the abolition of the parish), St Paul's Cray had a population of 2172.

== Nearby areas ==
St Paul's Cray borders Foots Cray to the north, Ruxley to the north east, Swanley to the east, St Mary Cray to the south east and south, Petts Wood to the south west and west and Chislehurst to the north west.

== Governance ==
St Paul's Cray is part of the Orpington constituency for elections to the House of Commons of the United Kingdom.

St Paul's Cray is represented by the St Paul's Cray ward which elects three councillors to Bromley London Borough Council.

== Transport ==
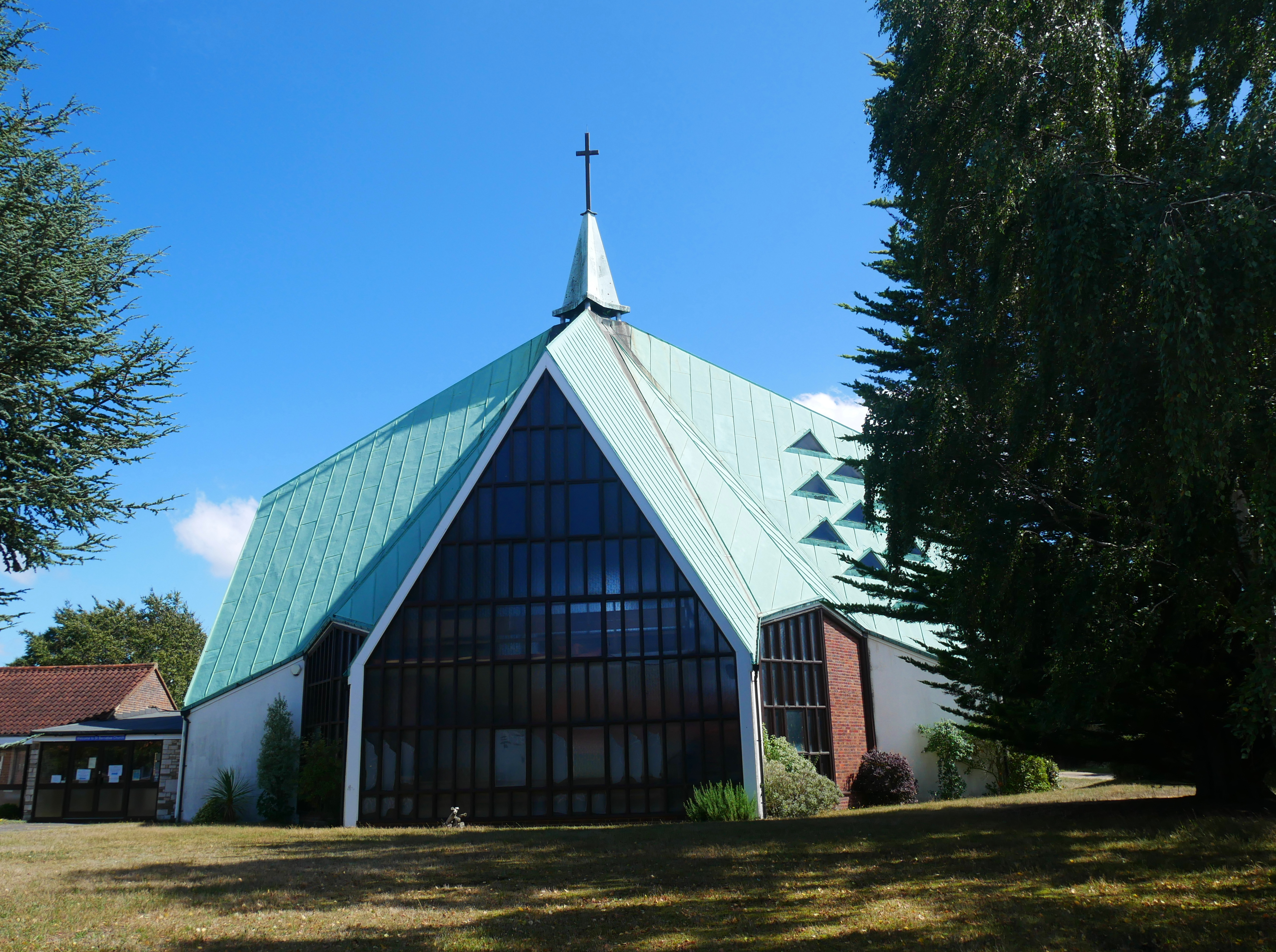
The twentieth-century Church of St Barnabas in St Paul's Cray

=== Rail ===
St Paul's Cray is served by St Mary Cray station with National Rail services to London Victoria via Bromley South, London Blackfriars via Bromley South and Catford, Sevenoaks, Ashford International via Maidstone East and Dover Priory via Chatham.

=== Buses ===
St Paul's Cray is served by London Buses routes 51, 273, B14, R1, R4 and R11. These connect it with areas including Bexleyheath, Chislehurst, Grove Park, Lewisham, Orpington, Sidcup, Welling and Woolwich.
