= Grade I and II* listed buildings in the London Borough of Bromley =

There are over 9,000 Grade I listed buildings and 20,000 Grade II* listed buildings in England. This page is a list of these buildings in the London Borough of Bromley.

== Grade I ==
Name	Location	Type	Completed (Note: The date given is the date used by Historic England as significant for the initial building or that of an important part in the structure's description.)	Date designated	Grid ref. (Note: Sometimes known as OSGB36, the grid reference is based on the British national grid reference system used by the Ordnance Survey.) Geo-coordinates	Entry number (Note: The "List Entry Number" is a unique number assigned to each listed building and scheduled monument by Historic England.)	Image
Bromley College	Bromley	House	1666	10 January 1955	TQ4002269573; 51°24′28″N 0°00′43″E	1359324	Bromley College More images
Bromley College Gateway	Bromley	Gate	1665	10 January 1955	TQ3999769565; 51°24′28″N 0°00′41″E	1064374	Bromley College Gateway More images
Down House	Downe	House	Early 19th century	31 May 1954	TQ4315461150; 51°19′53″N 0°03′12″E	1038325	Down House More images
Holwood House	Keston	Country house	1825	10 January 1955	TQ4224263549; 51°21′12″N 0°02′29″E	1281097	Holwood House More images
Keston Windmill	Keston	Windmill	1716	10 January 1955	TQ4154564028; 51°21′28″N 0°01′53″E	1064369	Keston Windmill More images
Crystal Palace Dinosaurs, with underlying geological formations & lead mine†	Crystal Palace	Statue	1852–55	29 June 1973	TQ3448770522; 51°25′04″N 0°04′02″W	1067798	Crystal Palace Dinosaurs, with underlying geological formations & lead mine† More images
Sundridge Park	Bromley	Country house	Early 18th century	10 January 1955	TQ4179170634; 51°25′01″N 0°02′16″E	1299044	Sundridge Park More images
Wickham Court	Beckenham	Courtyard house	Reign of Edward IV	28 May 1954	TQ3899164756; 51°21′54″N 0°00′18″W	1055809	Wickham Court More images

† on Islands and on land facing the Lower Lake

== Grade II* ==
Name	Location	Type	Completed	Date designated	Grid ref. Geo-coordinates	Entry number	Image
Bromley War Memorial, St Martin's Hill	Bromley	War memorial	1922	14 December 1995	TQ3997969238; 51°24′18″N 0°00′40″E	1116976	Bromley War Memorial, St Martin's Hill More images
Bullers Wood	Chislehurst	House	1889	29 June 1973	TQ4243469770; 51°24′33″N 0°02′48″E	1204400	Bullers Wood More images
Camden Place	Chislehurst	House	1609–23	25 August 1954	TQ4374170042; 51°24′40″N 0°03′56″E	1064325	Camden Place More images
Chesil House	Chislehurst	House	18th century	25 August 1954	TQ4458669981; 51°24′38″N 0°04′39″E	1299045	Chesil House More images
Church of All Saints	Orpington	Church	14th century	31 May 1954	TQ4666166413; 51°22′40″N 0°06′21″E	1083559	Church of All Saints More images
Church of St Giles the Abbot	Farnborough	Church	1640	31 May 1954	TQ4438164125; 51°21′28″N 0°04′20″E	1064339	Church of St Giles the Abbot More images
Church of St John the Baptist	West Wickham	Church	Late 15th century	28 May 1954	TQ3889864854; 51°21′57″N 0°00′22″W	1359332	Church of St John the Baptist More images
Lych-gate to Church of St John the Baptist's Churchyard	West Wickham	Lych gate	15th century or early 16th century	28 May 1954	TQ3893964849; 51°21′57″N 0°00′20″W	1064391	Lych-gate to Church of St John the Baptist's Churchyard More images
Church of St Martin of Tours	Bromley	Church	1857	31 May 1954	TQ4796064002; 51°21′21″N 0°07′25″E	1084343	Church of St Martin of Tours More images
Church of St Mary	Orpington	Church	Early 13th century	31 May 1954	TQ4722368367; 51°23′43″N 0°06′53″E	1045813	Church of St Mary More images
Church of St Mary the Virgin	Downe	Church	13th century	31 May 1954	TQ4320761650; 51°20′09″N 0°03′16″E	1359316	Church of St Mary the Virgin More images
Church of St Nicholas	Chislehurst	Church	c.1460	25 August 1954	TQ4441769919; 51°24′36″N 0°04′30″E	1064345	Church of St Nicholas More images
Church of St Paulinus	St Paul's Cray	Church	Late 12th century or early 13th century	25 August 1954	TQ4739369086; 51°24′06″N 0°07′03″E	1064396	Church of St Paulinus More images
Church of St Peter and St Paul	Bromley	Church	1855	10 January 1955	TQ4012169245; 51°24′18″N 0°00′47″E	1084373	Church of St Peter and St Paul More images
Church of St Peter and St Paul	Cudham	Church	Anglo Saxon origins	31 May 1954	TQ4449759952; 51°19′13″N 0°04′20″E	1359355	Church of St Peter and St Paul More images
Crystal Palace National Sports Centre	Bromley	Sports centre	1960–64	2 December 1997	TQ3447570894; 51°25′16″N 0°04′03″W	1031539	Crystal Palace National Sports Centre More images
Keston Parish Church	Keston	Church	12th-century origin	10 January 1955	TQ4184163002; 51°20′54″N 0°02′07″E	1064343	Keston Parish Church More images
Kevington Hall	Orpington	Country house	Late 18th century	31 May 1954	TQ4793967640; 51°23′19″N 0°07′29″E	1359374	Kevington Hall More images
Parish Church of St George	Beckenham	Church	1902–03	28 May 1954	TQ3747769644; 51°24′33″N 0°01′29″W	1054025	Parish Church of St George More images
Church of the Annunciation	Chislehurst	Church	1868–70	29 June 1973	TQ4383970931; 51°25′09″N 0°04′02″E	1359325	Church of the Annunciation More images
Quernmore Secondary School	Bromley	House	About 1777	10 January 1955	TQ4019270453; 51°24′57″N 0°00′53″E	1055761	Upload Photo
Orpington Priory	Orpington	House	15th century	31 May 1954	TQ4657766533; 51°22′44″N 0°06′17″E	1064330	Orpington Priory More images
Subway, Vestibule, Terrace and Stairs to the Crystal Palace	Crystal Palace	Subway		26 September 1972	TQ3379170972; 51°25′19″N 0°04′38″W	1385457	Subway, Vestibule, Terrace and Stairs to the Crystal Palace More images
