= Derry Downs =

Coordinates: 51.384977°N 0.116109°E

- Location within Greater London
- OS grid reference: TQ460660
- London borough: Bromley
- Ceremonial county: Greater London
- Region: London
- Country: England
- Sovereign state: United Kingdom
- Post town: ORPINGTON
- Postcode district: BR5
- Police: Metropolitan
- Fire: London
- Ambulance: London
- London Assembly: Bexley and Bromley

Derry Downs is an area of south-east London, England, within the London Borough of Bromley and, prior to 1965, in the historic county of Kent. It is located south of St Mary Cray, west of Kevington, north of Ramsden, and east of Orpington.

== History ==
The origin of the name Derry Downs is unclear, with it first appearing in records in the second half of the 1800s. The first housing on the eponymous street was built in 1866, with development continuing slowly until the end of the century, being predominantly bespoke houses of a generous size. Housing development continued throughout the 20th century, and the area today forms an eastern suburban extension of Orpington.

== Notable people ==
- William Henry, son of William Cook who bred the Orpington chicken, lived at Elmdene, 51 Derry Downs.
