= Ramsden Estate =

Ramsden Estate may refer to:

- Ramsden Estate (Huddersfield), the holdings of the former manor of Huddersfield, Yorkshire, England
- Ramsden Estate (Orpington), a housing estate in Orpington, London, England
