= Bromley College =

Bromley College may refer to:

- Bromley College of Further & Higher Education, part of London South East Colleges
- Bromley & Sheppard’s Colleges
- Bromley College of Art
