= Goddington =

Coordinates: 51.366°N 0.112°E

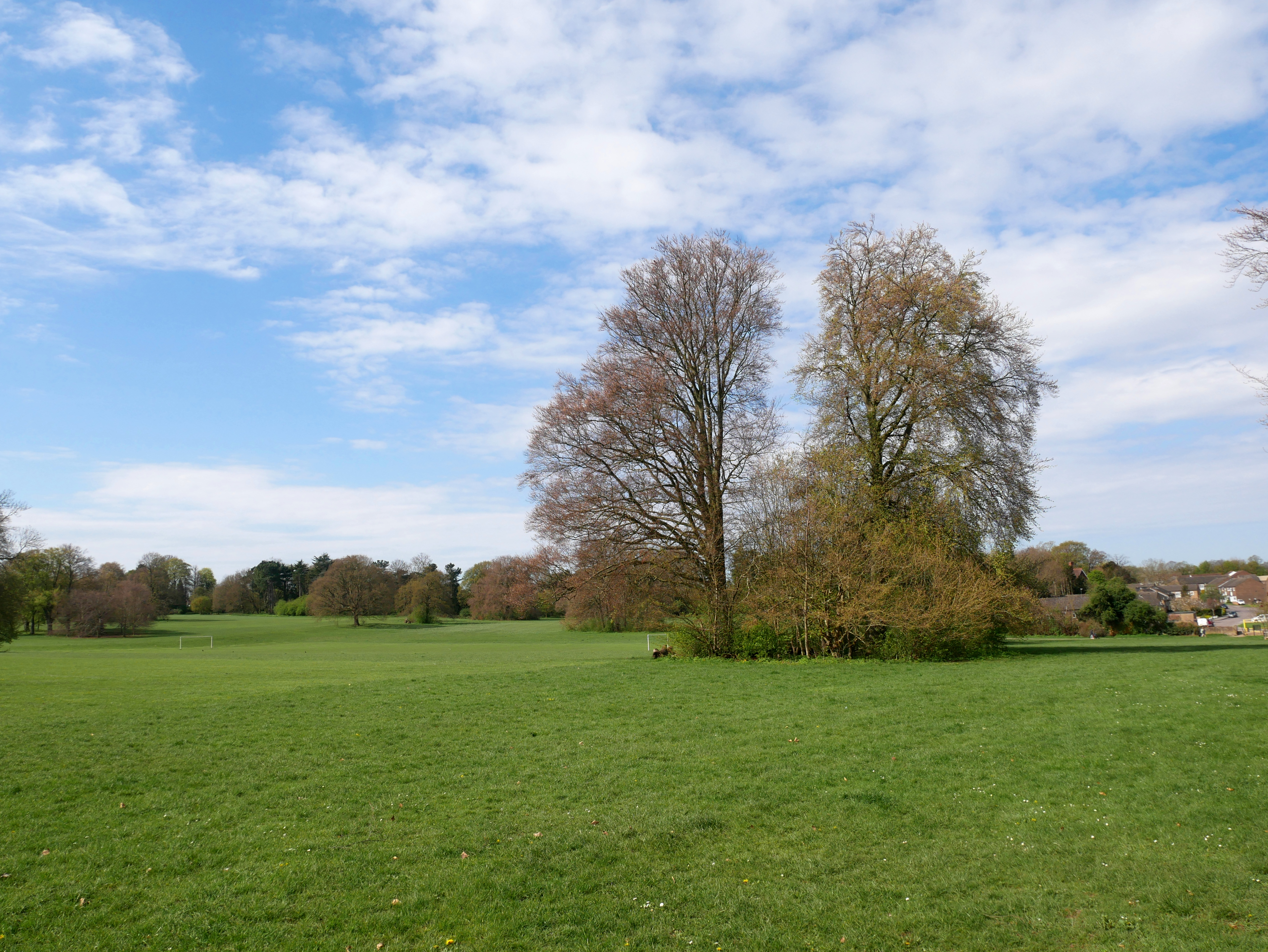

- Location within Greater London
- London borough: Bromley
- Ceremonial county: Greater London
- Region: London
- Country: England
- Sovereign state: United Kingdom
- Post town: ORPINGTON
- Postcode district: BR6
- Dialling code: 01689
- Police: Metropolitan
- Fire: London
- Ambulance: London
- UK Parliament: Orpington
- London Assembly: Bexley and Bromley

Goddington is an area in south-east London, located in the London Borough of Bromley. It is situated south of Ramsden, south-east of Orpington town centre, and north of Chelsfield. It lies directly adjacent to the London Green Belt. Until 1965, it lay in the historic county of Kent.

== History ==
Goddington was historically a rural manor, first recorded in the 1200s as being the lands held by Simon de Godyngton, which in turn refers to his family's ancestral lands in Godinton, Kent. The area only began to be developed in 1926 when housing was built along Park Avenue. The area was subsequently developed further, and in 1965 it became part of the London Borough of Bromley in the newly formed ceremonial county of Greater London.

== Amenities ==
Goddington Park is 64 hectares in size, with five football pitches, two cricket squares, and three rugby pitches. It includes an astro-turf football court, about 10 tennis courts and two children's play areas. The main entrance is from Goddington Lane, with footpaths from Avalon Road, Court Road and Chelsfield Lane and a further entrance from Berrylands.

St Olave's Grammar School, built 1968, is located on Goddington Lane.

== Sports ==
- Westcombe Park Rugby Club (located here since 1990).
