= Camden Place =

Country house in Chislehurst, England

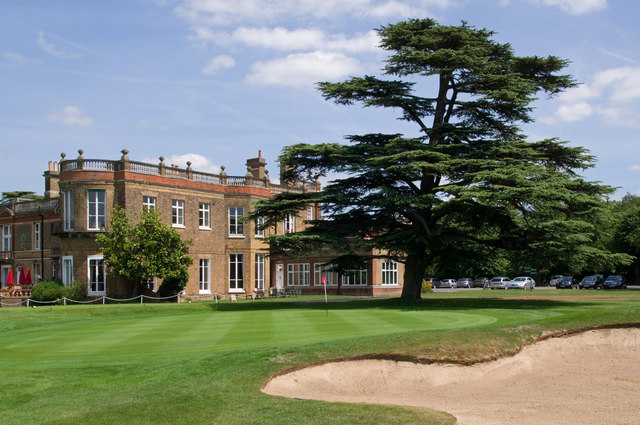
- The building in June 2011

- Shown in Bromley
- 51.4112°N 0.0655°E
- Location: Camden Park Road, Bromley

History
- Built: 1717

Site notes
- Architectural style: Neoclassical style

Listed Building – Grade II*
- Official name: Camden Place
- Designated: 25 August 1954
- Reference no.: 1064325

Camden Place is a country house in Chislehurst in Bromley, London, England. The house, which is now used as the club house of Chislehurst Golf Club, is a Grade II* listed building.

== History ==
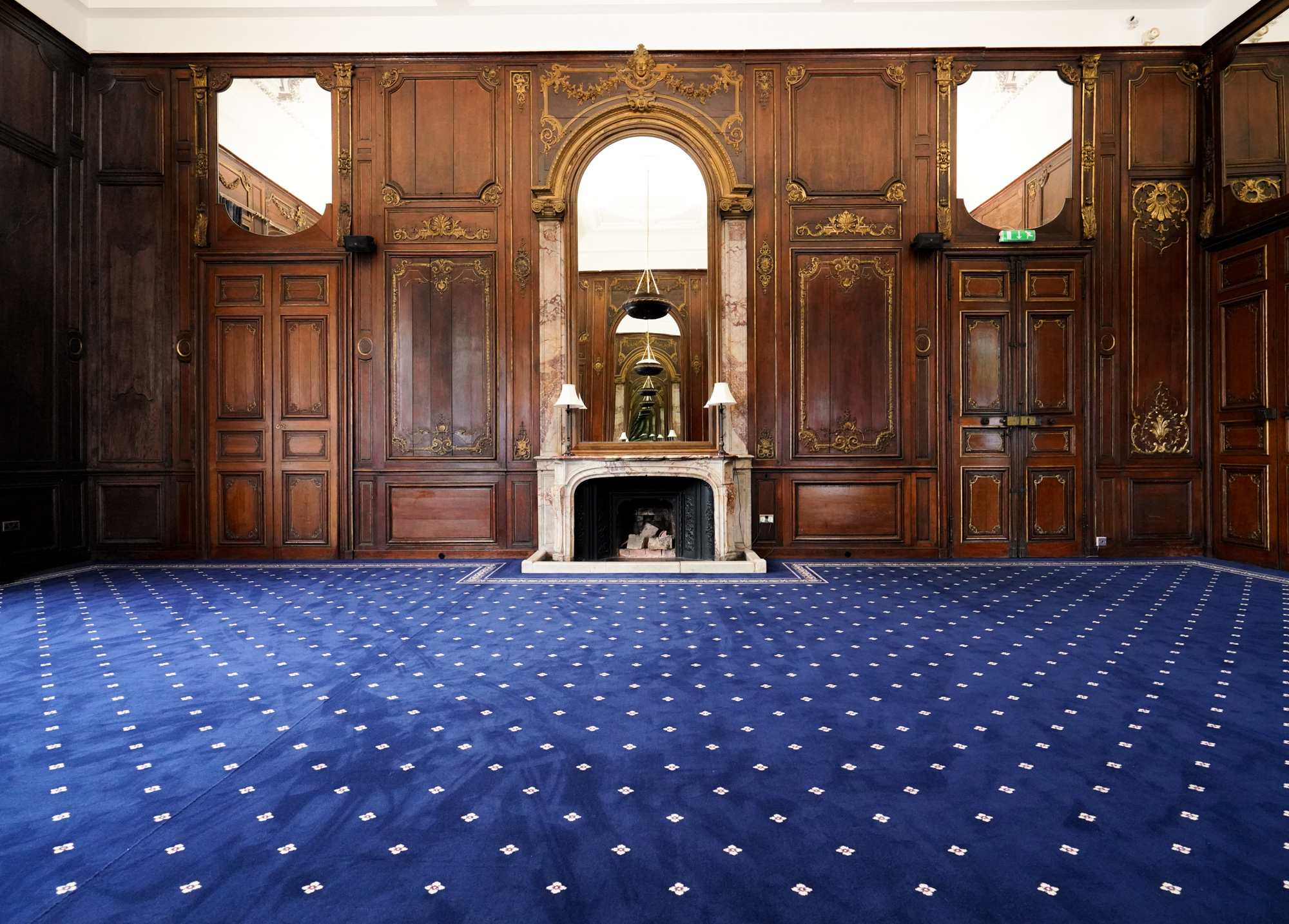
The dining room at Camden Place

An earlier house on the site was occupied by the antiquary William Camden, who lived there from c. 1609 until his death in 1623.

The present house was commissioned by a merchant, Robert Weston, in the early 18th century. It was designed in the neoclassical style, built in buff brick and completed in 1717. It was expanded in the late 18th and very early 19th centuries to a design by the architect, George Dance the Younger. The design involved an asymmetrical main frontage of seven bays facing southwest. The central bay was canted forward and there was a curved projection on the left of the main frontage. It was fenestrated on both floors with casement windows and, at roof level, there was a balustraded parapet with finials.

The house was acquired by the Attorney General for England and Wales, Charles Pratt, 1st Earl Camden, in 1760, by the merchant, Thomson Bonar in 1805 and by the financier, Henry Rowles, in the 1830s. The young Louis-Napoleon of France had a romantic relationship with Rowles' daughter, Emily, in the 1830s. The house was acquired by a lawyer, Nathaniel William John Strode, in the mid-19th century and parts of it were then leased out. Strode fitted out the dining room with fine panelling recovered from the Château de Bercy when it was demolished in 1861.

Louis-Napoleon became emperor Napoleon III of France in 1852, but after defeat in the Franco-Prussian War of 1870, he was exiled to the UK, rented rooms at Camden Place, and lived there with the former empress, Eugénie, and their son, the Prince Imperial. Queen Victoria visited them there and was received in their dining room.

Following the former emperor's death in 1873, there was an official lying-in-state at Camden Place. His body and that of his son, the Prince Imperial, were originally buried in St Mary's Catholic Church in Chislehurst, before being removed to St Michael's Abbey, Farnborough.

Eugénie continued to live at Camden Place until she moved to Farnborough Hill in Farnborough, Hampshire, in 1881. The house then became the club house of Chislehurst Golf Club in 1894.

== See also ==
- Grade I and II* listed buildings in the London Borough of Bromley
