= Church of All Saints, Orpington =

Historic site in Orpington, Bromley, London

Coordinates: 51°22′40″N 0°06′21″E

Church of All Saints
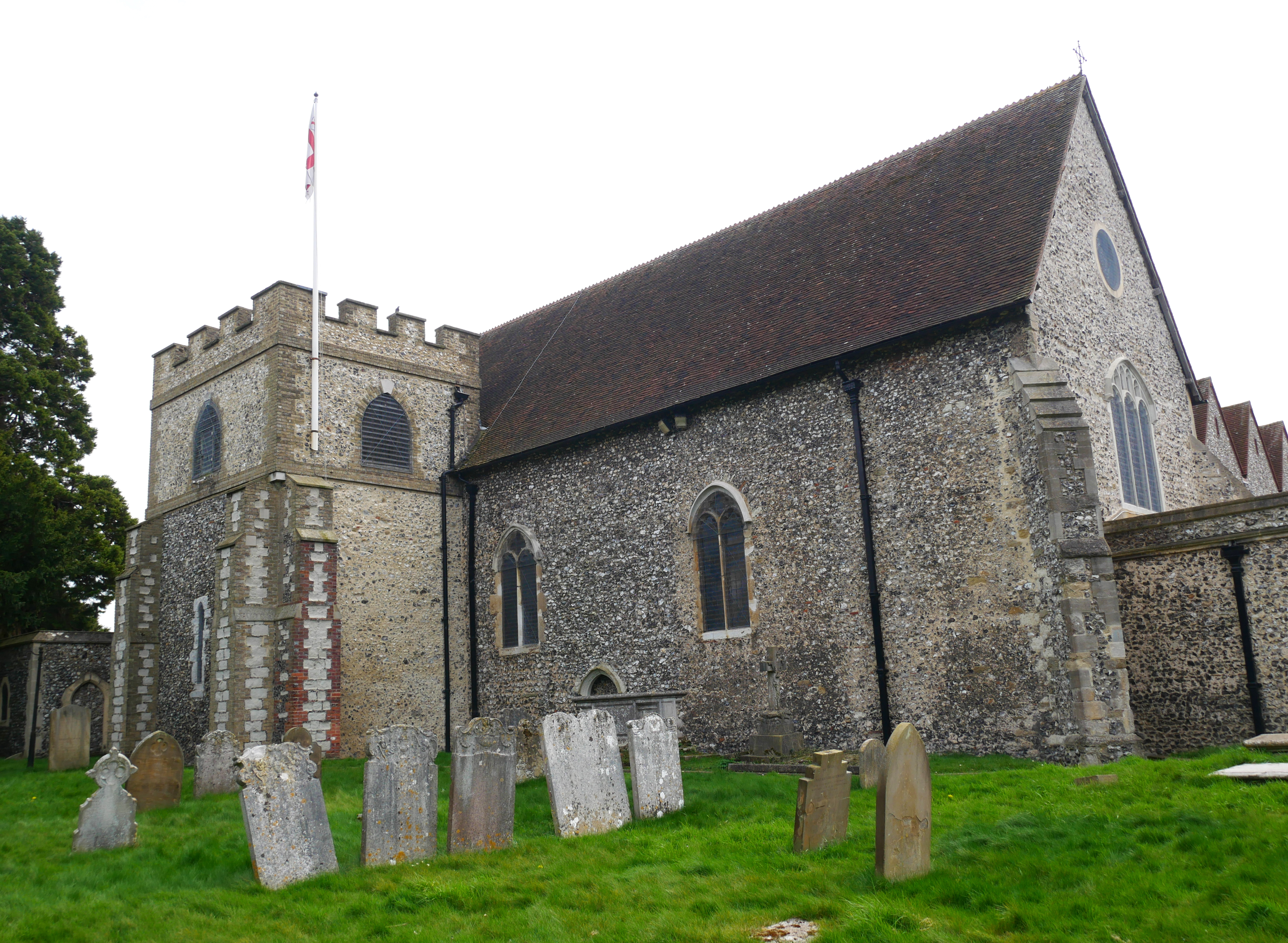

Listed Building – Grade II*
- Official name: Church of All Saints
- Designated: 31 May 1954
- Reference no.: 1083559

The Church of All Saints is a Grade II* listed church in Orpington, Bromley, London.

== History ==
The old part of the church dates back to the Anglo-Saxon period in 1070. In 1957, a new church was built according to the design of Geddes Hislop, and the extensively renovated old church became an annex of the new church.

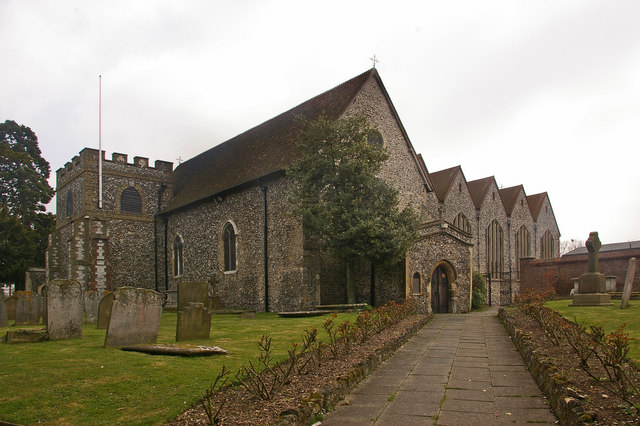

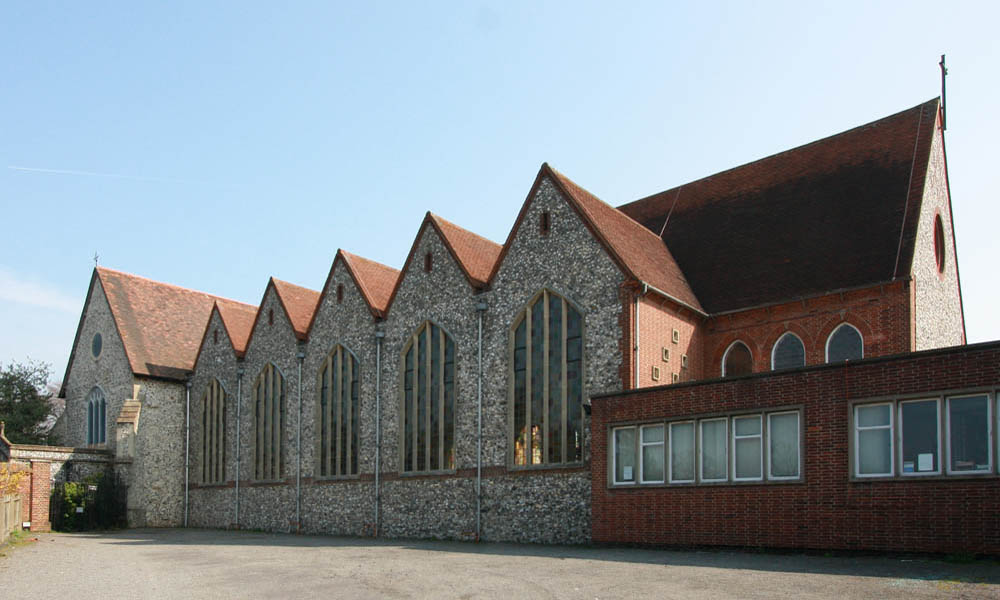

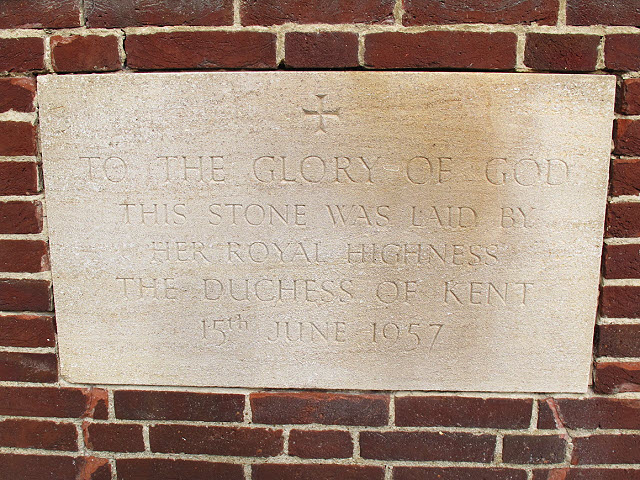
All Saints datestone

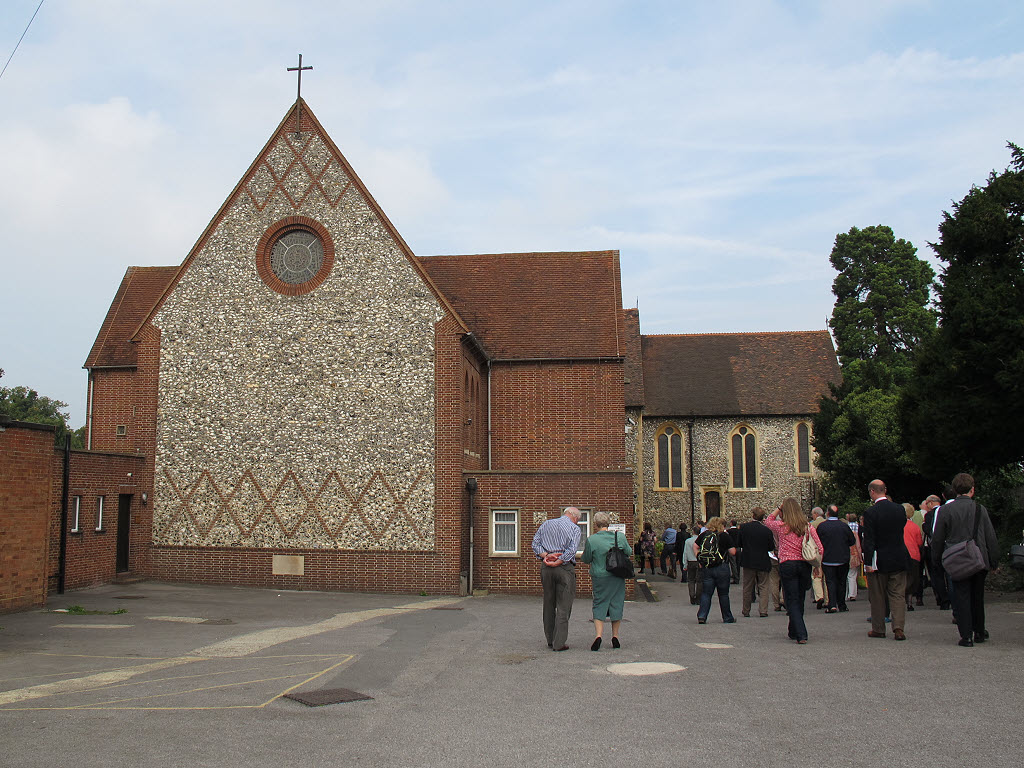
South end
