= Ramsden, Orpington =

Housing estate in Orpington, London

Coordinates: 51.373982°N 0.116935°E

Ramsden
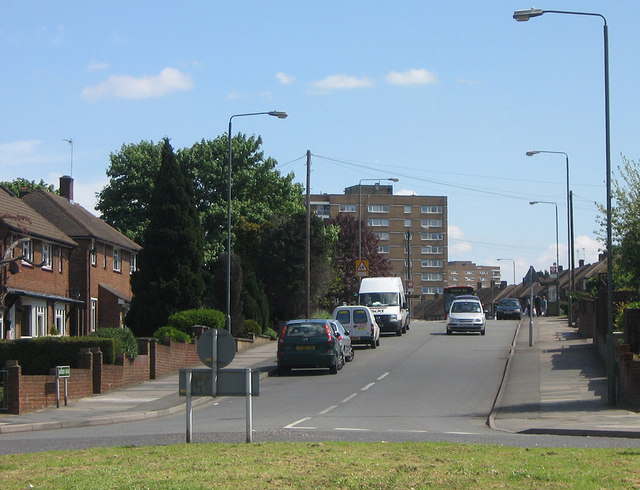
- In the background is Crundale Tower with Hollingbourne Tower beyond, both built in the 1960s as part of the development of the Ramsden estate.

- Location within Greater London
- OS grid reference: TQ460660
- London borough: Bromley
- Ceremonial county: Greater London
- Region: London
- Country: England
- Sovereign state: United Kingdom
- Post town: ORPINGTON
- Postcode district: BR5
- Dialling code: 01689
- Police: Metropolitan
- Fire: London
- Ambulance: London
- UK Parliament: Orpington
- London Assembly: Bexley and Bromley

Ramsden is an area in south-east London, generally considered a suburb of Orpington, located in the London Borough of Bromley and, prior to 1965, within the historic county of Kent. It is situated south of Derry Downs and St Mary Cray, east of Orpington town centre and north of Goddington. It was built as a council estate in the 1950-60s and is directly adjacent to the London Green Belt.

== History ==
The area was historically rural and agricultural, with the name possibly referring to pastureland kept for rams. The estate was built in the public-housing boom following the Second World War. It is made up of a large number of semi-detached houses built in the 1950s and a new central area built in the 1970s consisting of three high rise blocks and 48 maisonettes. The Estate comprises Ramsden Road, Tintagel Road, Petten Grove, Eldred Drive, Quilter Road, Westbrook Drive, Brow Crescent and Rye Crescent, with Plantation Drive and various closes around the three tower blocks being added in the 1970s.

Like many post-war estates, Ramsden had entered a troubled period by the 1980s, with a rise in crime and anti-social behaviour earning it the nickname 'Little Belfast'. In the 2000s decade the estate was regenerated under the 'Ramsden's Revival' scheme led by Broomleigh housing association. There is a small row of shops on Eldred Drive.
