= Orpington =

Town in Greater London, England

Coordinates: 51.3741°N 0.0986°E

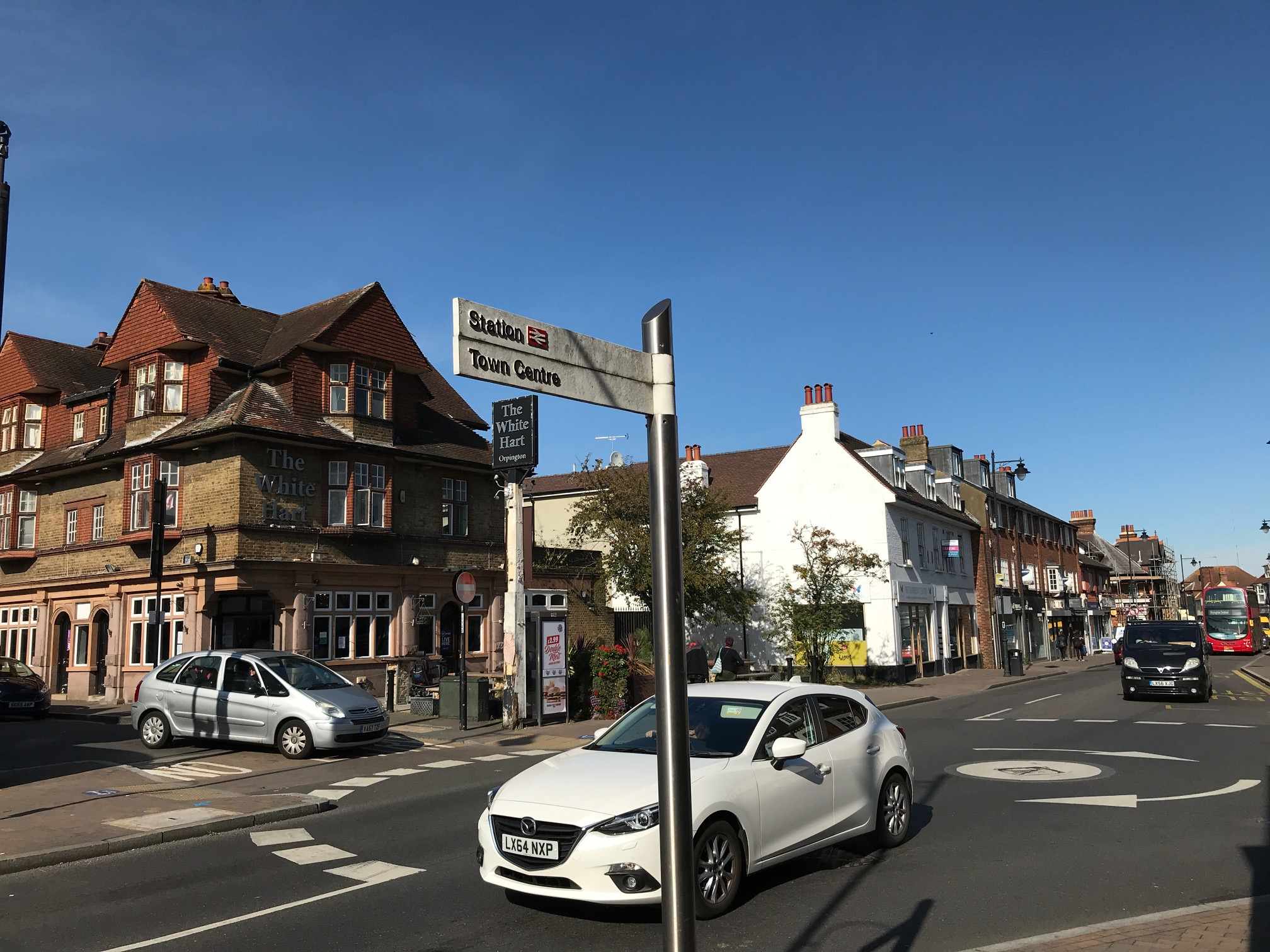
- Orpington High Street, with White Hart public house on the left

- Location within Greater London
- Population: 90,315 (Orpington and its localities) 2011 Census
- OS grid reference: TQ460660
  - Charing Cross: 13.4 mi (21.6 km) NW
- London borough: Bromley
- Ceremonial county: Greater London
- Region: London
- Country: England
- Sovereign state: United Kingdom
- Post town: ORPINGTON
- Postcode district: BR5, BR6
- Dialling code: 01689
- Police: Metropolitan
- Fire: London
- Ambulance: London
- UK Parliament: Orpington
- London Assembly: Bexley and Bromley

Orpington is a town in Greater London, England, within the London Borough of Bromley. It is 13.4 miles (21.6 km) southeast of Charing Cross, close to the border with Kent.

On the south-eastern edge of the Greater London Built-up Area, it is south of St Mary Cray, southwest of Swanley, west of Ramsden, north of Goddington and Green Street Green, and east of Crofton and Broom Hill. Orpington is covered by the London BR postcode area.

It is identified in the London Plan as one of 35 major centres in Greater London.

== History ==
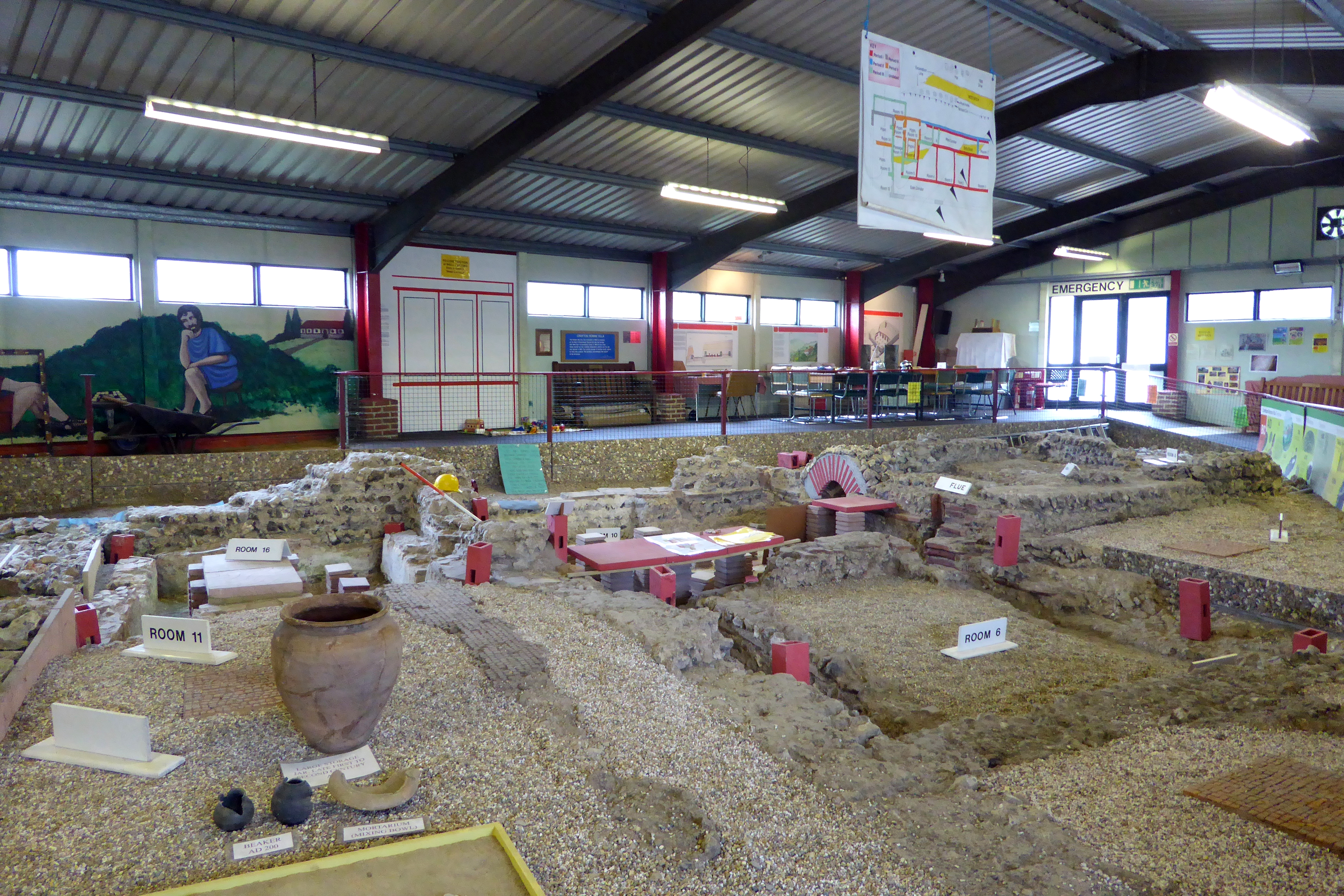
The ruins of Crofton Roman Villa near Orpington Railway Station

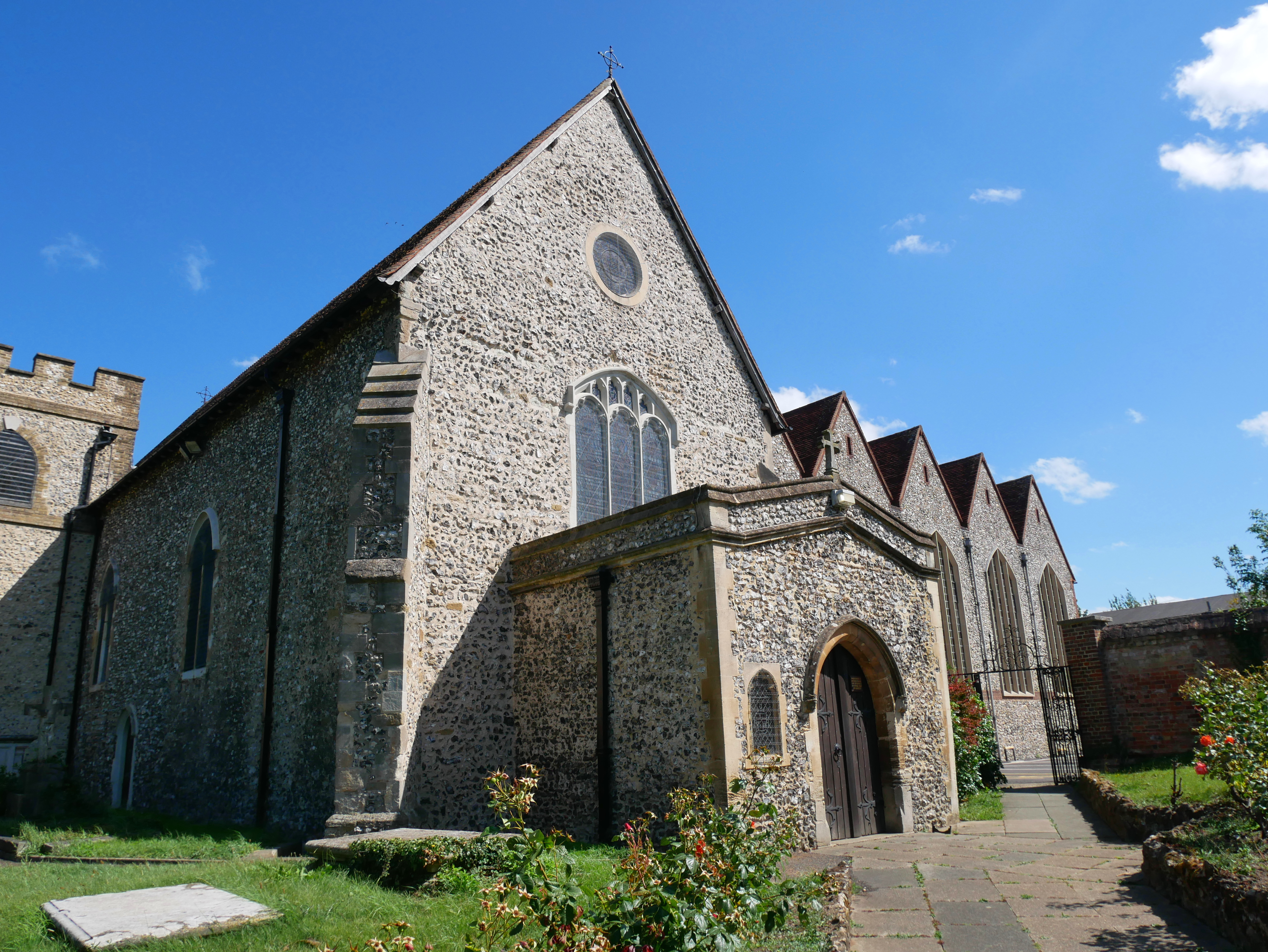
The medieval Church of All Saints in Orpington

Stone Age tools have been found in several areas of Orpington, including Goddington Park, Priory Gardens, the Ramsden estate, and Poverest. Early Bronze Age pottery fragments have been found in the Park Avenue area. During the building of Ramsden Boys School in 1956, the remains of an Iron Age farmstead were excavated. The area was occupied in Roman times, as shown by Crofton Roman Villa and the Roman bath-house at Fordcroft. During the Anglo-Saxon period, Fordcroft Anglo-Saxon cemetery was used in the area.

The first record of the name Orpington occurs in 1038, when King Cnut's treasurer Eadsy gave land at "Orpedingetune" to the Monastery of Christ Church at Canterbury. The name means 'Orped's farmstead', Orped being an Anglo-Saxon first-name. The Church of All Saints was also built in the Anglo-Saxon period. On 22 July 1573, Queen Elizabeth I was entertained at Bark Hart (Orpington Priory) and her horses stabled at the Anchor and Hope Inn on the High Street.

Historically, the major local commercial centre was nearby St Mary Cray rather than Orpington. St Mary Cray had a regular market, and industry (paper mills and bell foundry). In contrast, Orpington was a small country village surrounded by soft fruit farms, hop fields and orchards. These crops attracted Romani people, working as itinerant pickers, to annual camps in local meadows and worked-out chalk pits. Although this work has largely ended, the Borough still provides a permanent site for travellers at Star Lane, and historic gatherings are commemorated in local street names, such as Romany Rise. In 1967, Eric Lubbock, then Liberal MP for Orpington, promoted a Private Member's Bill to provide permanent Romani sites; this resulted in the Caravan Sites Act 1968 that placed an obligation upon local authorities to provide sites for locally residing travellers. In 1971, an international meeting of Romany people was held at Orpington; this Orpington Congress marked the founding of the International Romani Union, a group seeking political representation for Romanis throughout Europe.

Orpington railway station opened in 1868 to the southwest of the town centre, prompting housing development in the Crofton and Broom Hill areas, with the Derry Downs areas to the east also developed at about the same time. The station was expanded in 1904, prompting a wave of house building that peaked in the 1920-30s, transforming the area into a suburb of London. The Walnuts Shopping Centre was built in the early 1970s.

== Government ==
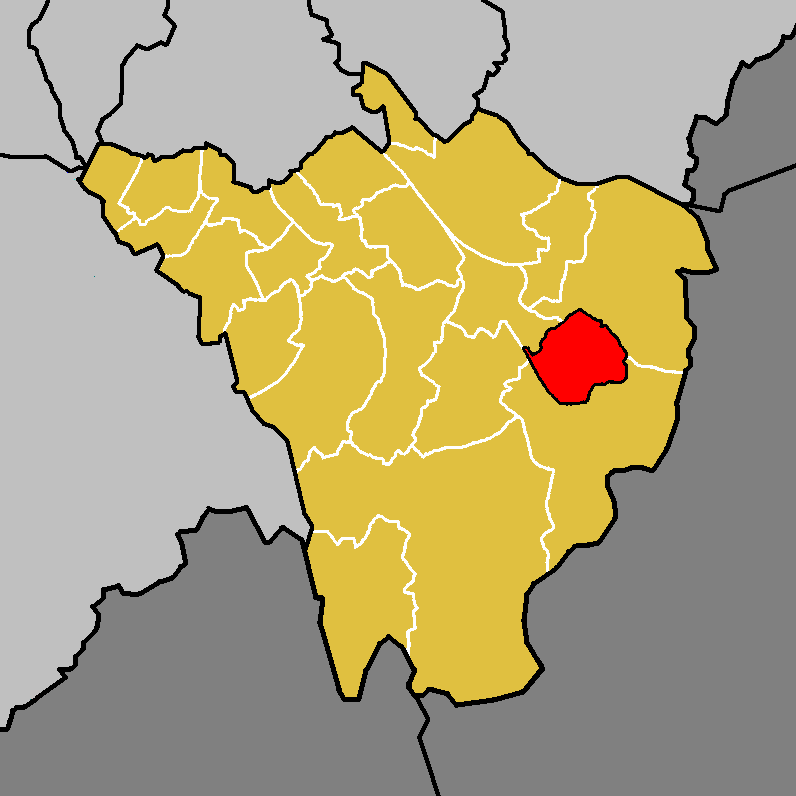
The ward of Orpington (red) shown within the borough of Bromley (orange)

Orpington has been part of the London Borough of Bromley since 1 April 1965. Prior to this Orpington's local government was the Orpington Urban District within the county of Kent. Orpington forms part of the Orpington (UK Parliament constituency) and the current MP is Gareth Bacon, who has held the seat since 2019 for the Conservative Party. Orpington constituency, which covers a large swathe of southern Bromley borough, is regarded as a Conservative safe seat, with the party winning the seat in every general election held since 1970. Gareth Bacon is also the London Assembly member for the Bexley and Bromley constituency in which Orpington is located.

Orpington is a town located in Greater London, specifically within the London Borough of Bromley. It has farms, roads, and homes divided by the border with Kent. This characteristic means that some areas of Orpington fall within the administrative boundaries of Bromley, while others extend into Kent.

=== By-election of 1962 ===
After the Conservative member for the Orpington constituency, Donald Sumner, had resigned to become a county court judge, a by-election was held on 15 March 1962. Orpington was considered a safe Conservative seat, but Eric Lubbock, the Liberal candidate, won with a 22% swing away from the Conservatives. The result caused a sensation and was headline news across the nation. It is from this win that the revival of the Liberal Party is usually dated.

== Demographics ==
Data from the 2011 census reported that the population of Orpington was 15,311 with 52% being female and 48% male. The average age is 42, slightly above the national average age of 40. 86% of Orpington's population was born in England, with the second highest group being those born in Scotland at 1.1%. 95.1% of Orpington's population speak English, with 'Others' at 0.4%. Christianity is the most prominent religion in Orpington, with 63.1% of the population identifying as Christian; 'no religion' was second with 24.4% and Islam third at 2.1%. 45 people identify as Jewish and five as Buddhist. 51.1% of the local population is married, 23.8% are single, 8.2% cohabit with a partner of the opposite sex and 0.5% cohabit with a partner of the same sex. The leading occupation is 'professionals' who make up 19.2% of the population followed by administrative and secretarial at 16.2%.

== Retail and commerce ==
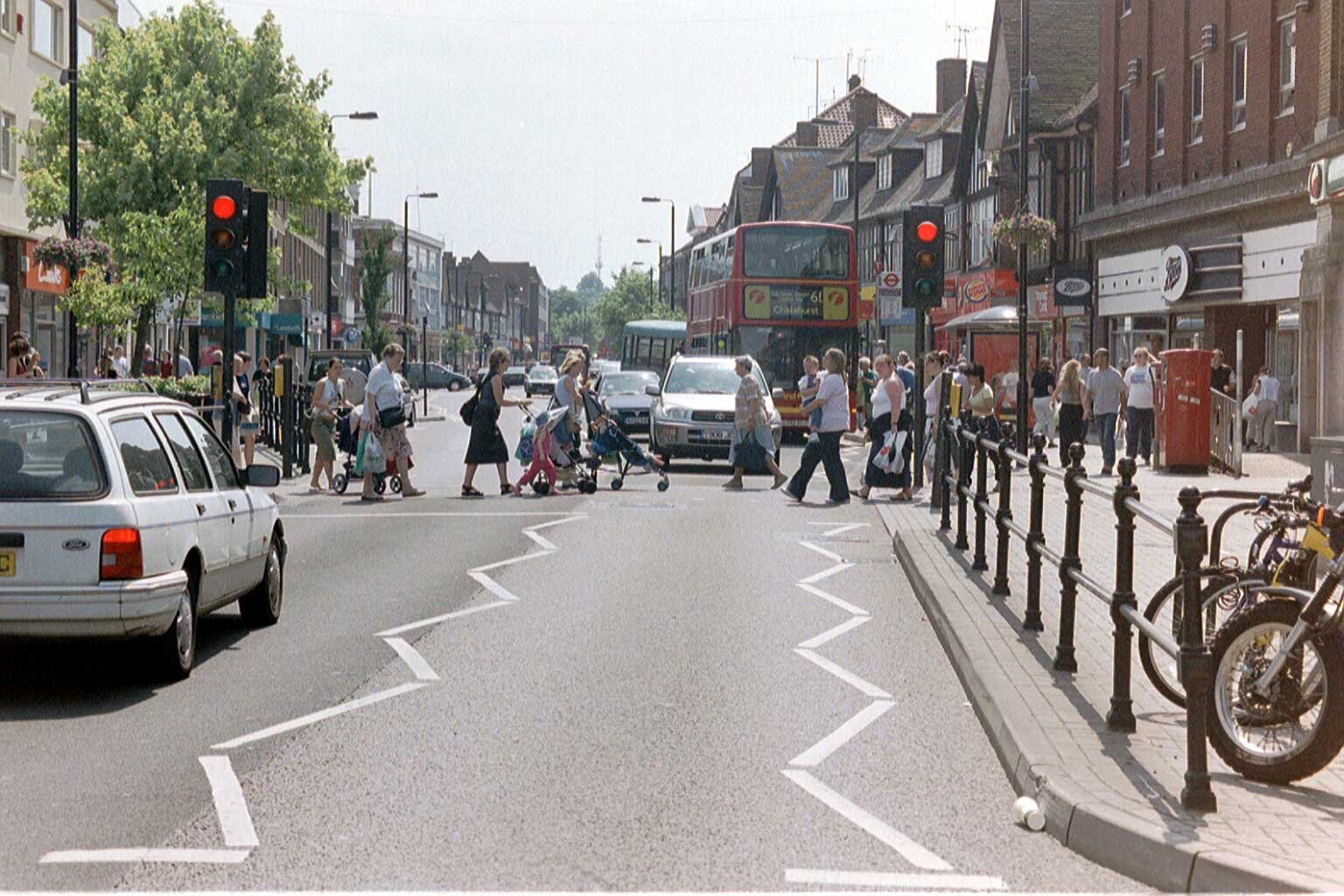
Orpington High Street, looking south

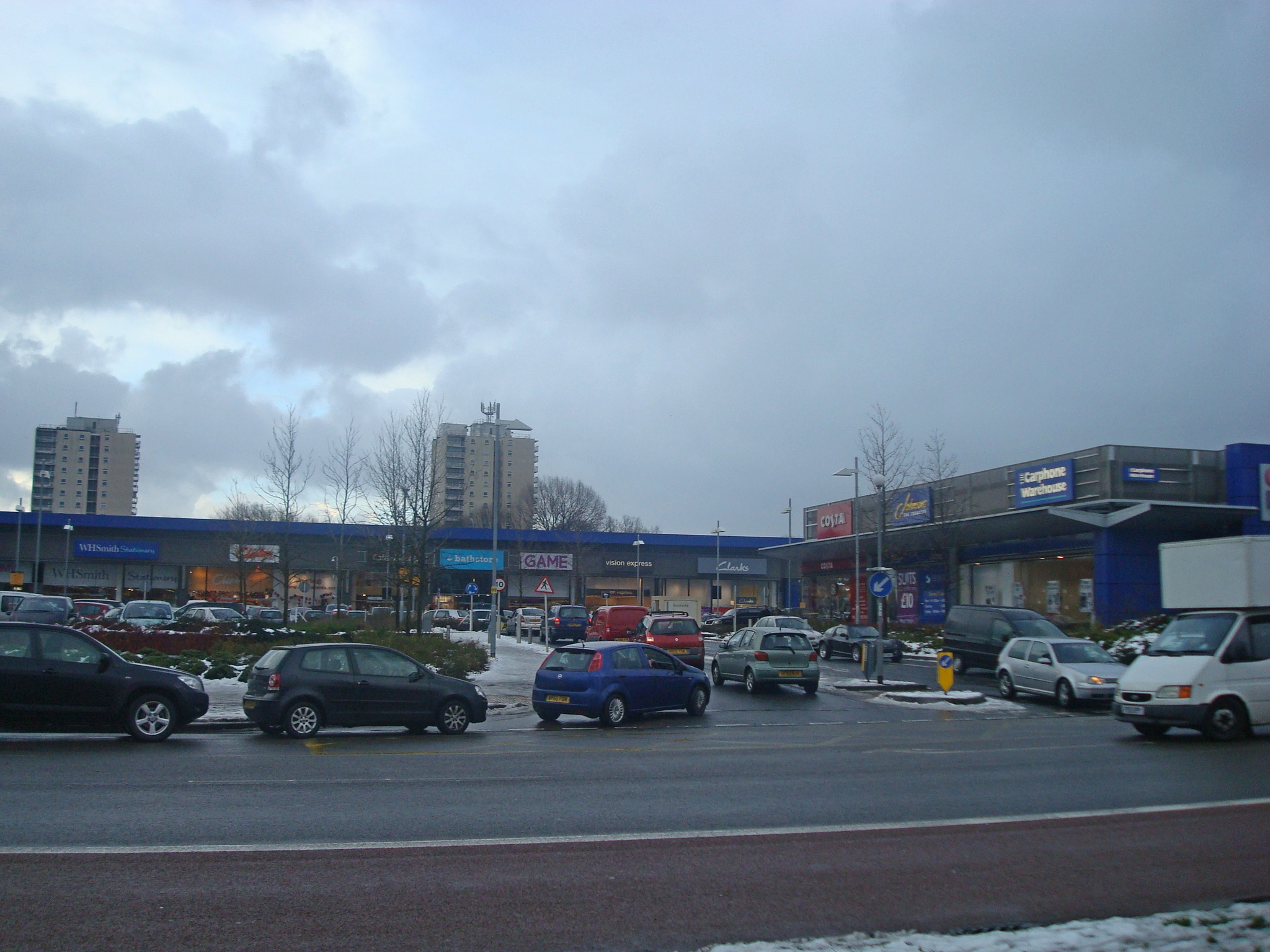
Nugent Shopping Park

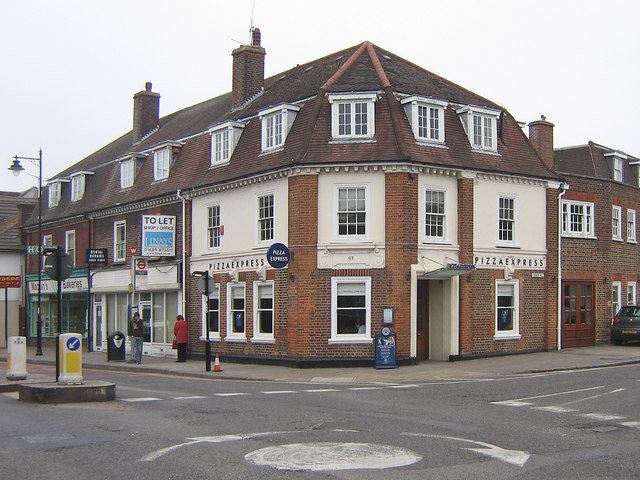
A former bank branch on a corner site in the High Street

The High Street and adjacent Walnuts Shopping Centre contain a variety of high-street shops, pubs and restaurants. A large Tesco supermarket opened in 2009 on the site of a former multi-storey car park. There is also a general market three days a week in front of Orpington College. In 2017 a restricted parking zone was introduced on Orpington High Street, which enabled the council to wipe away road markings indicating parking restrictions. By combining the lack of markings with CCTV monitoring, the council has been able to reduce the amount of street clutter and improve the quality of the High Street environment.

Much of the town's retailers reside at the Nugent Shopping Park. This retail park is located to the north of the high street, in the St Mary Cray area. The vicinity of the park also hosts several 'big box' retail outlets.

== Sport and leisure ==
The Walnuts Leisure Centre, just east of the High Street, has a six-lane, 25-metre indoor swimming pool, squash courts and a gym with sauna and steam room, as well as a sports hall used for activities such as badminton, basketball, trampolining and fitness classes. The sports hall is also used for Women's Artistic Gymnastics, and the leisure centre has been the main training venue for Orpington Gymnastic Club since the opening of the centre.

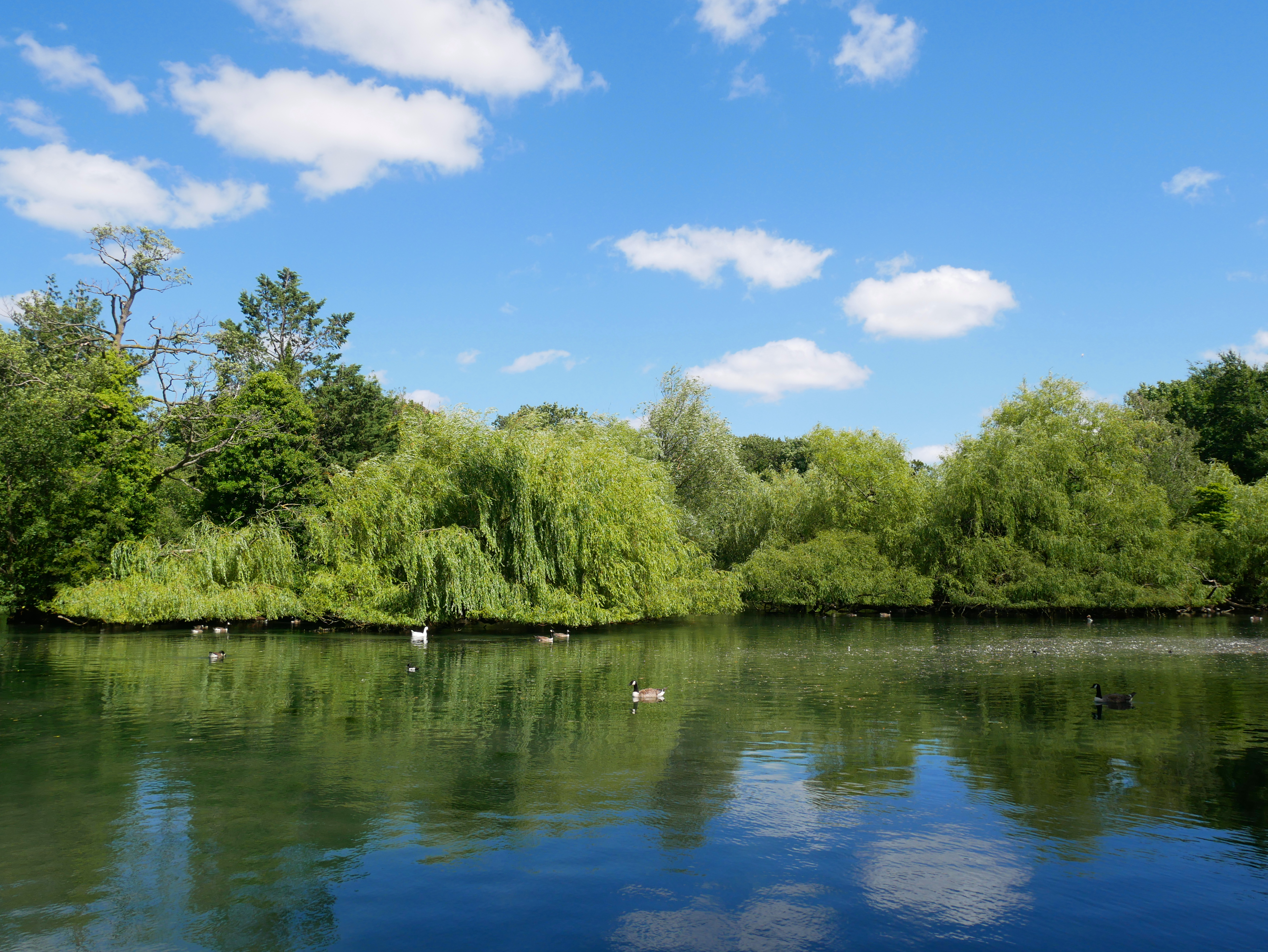
The pond at Priory Gardens is the source of the River Cray.

There are also other leisure centres such as one situated at Harris Academy Orpington, which has a floodlit, synthetic pitch for hockey and football, three outdoor tennis courts, two netball courts, four outdoor cricket nets and a sports hall with gymnasium/fitness suite and dance studio. Another is Banaatyne Health Club, a members-only health club on Sandy Lane which was previously LA Fitness but changed causing controversy in late 2015. Other exercise facilities include bodybuilding gym Ripped Muscle And Fitness located on Orpington high street, previously Keddles Gym (now based in Dartford), and Anytime fitness which can be found on Orpington high street.

There are rugby, football, tennis and cricket pitches in Goddington Park which are used by Westcombe Park RFC, Orpington Cricket Club, Orpington Football Club and Locksbottom Town FC. Westcombe Park RFC competes in National League 3 London & SE (four leagues below premiership rugby). 'Combe' moved from the Blackheath area to Orpington in 1936. Cray Wanderers F.C., established in 1860 no longer plays in Orpington, but now shares a ground with Bromley F.C. On 3 October 2014 Cray Wanderers signed a conditional contract to purchase Flamingo Park Sports Centre on the A20 Sidcup bypass. The club subsequently obtained planning permission from Bromley Council for a new sporting community hub, featuring a new multi-sport stadium with a spectator capacity of 2,200. However, in July 2016 new London Mayor Sadiq Khan vetoed the plan as part of his pledge to protect green belt land.

Orpington Boxing Club has produced numerous amateur champions. It moved to Westerham in 1986. The club closed in 2013 due to lack of funding, but reopened in Pettswood in 2024 with a 15 year lease.

Since 1985, members of Orpington Road Runners have met every Tuesday near The Buff Pub and on Sundays at High Elms Country Park. For over 10 years, the club has organised a 10k race and series of 2k fun runs during the summer in conjunction with Darrick Wood School. Bromley Indoor Bowls Club is situated off Gillmans Road. Lawn bowls is played at the Excelsior Club in Poverest Recreation Ground. Knoll Lawn Tennis Club has (despite its name) five tarmac courts tucked away among the houses of Mayfield Avenue and Lynwood Grove. Bromley Tennis Centre (six indoor courts and four floodlit outdoor courts) is in the grounds of Newstead Wood School.

Construction work on a new cinema complex at The Walnuts Centre commenced in 2014; the seven screen Odeon Cinema opened on 26 February 2016. Orpington was without a cinema since 1982, when the old Commodore cinema closed.

== Education ==
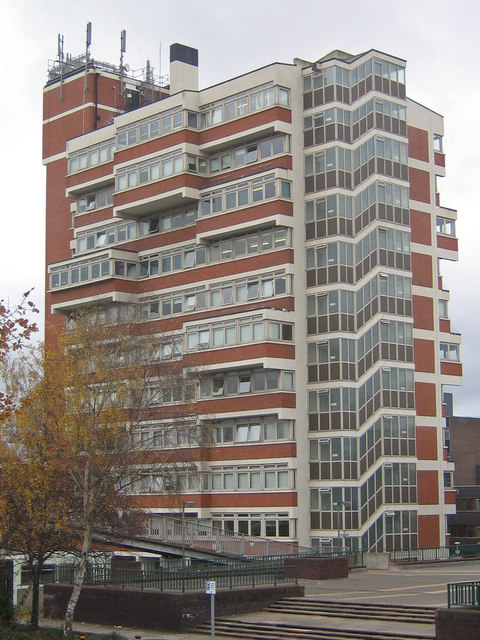
Bromley College's Orpington campus

Education in Orpington is managed by the London Borough of Bromley which is the local education authority. The town contains a range of primary and secondary schools. The state secondary schools include St. Olave's Grammar School and Newstead Wood School, which both select students on the basis of their performance in a highly competitive entrance examination.

The Orpington campus of Bromley College, Bromley is a further education college, affiliated with the University of Greenwich and Canterbury Christ Church University. It was originally built as Orpington College in 1972, and remains the tallest building in the area, being refurbished in 2008 and then merging with Bromley College in 2011.

== Transport ==
Orpington railway station is a transport hub served by Southeastern with trains to the Central London stations of Charing Cross and Cannon Street via Grove Park, as well as Victoria via Bromley South and Herne Hill. In the other direction services call at Sevenoaks, Tunbridge Wells and Hastings.

Orpington is served by London Buses routes 51, 61, 208, 353, 358, B14, R1, R2, R3, R4, R5, R6, R7, R8, R9, R10, R11, school routes 654, 684, night route N199, Go-Coach route 3 and Kent Country route 477.

The M25 motorway around London passes Orpington to the south of the town and three A roads, the A208, A224 and A232, pass through the area. Additionally, the A21 passes along the town's southern border.

== Landmarks ==
=== The Parish Church ===
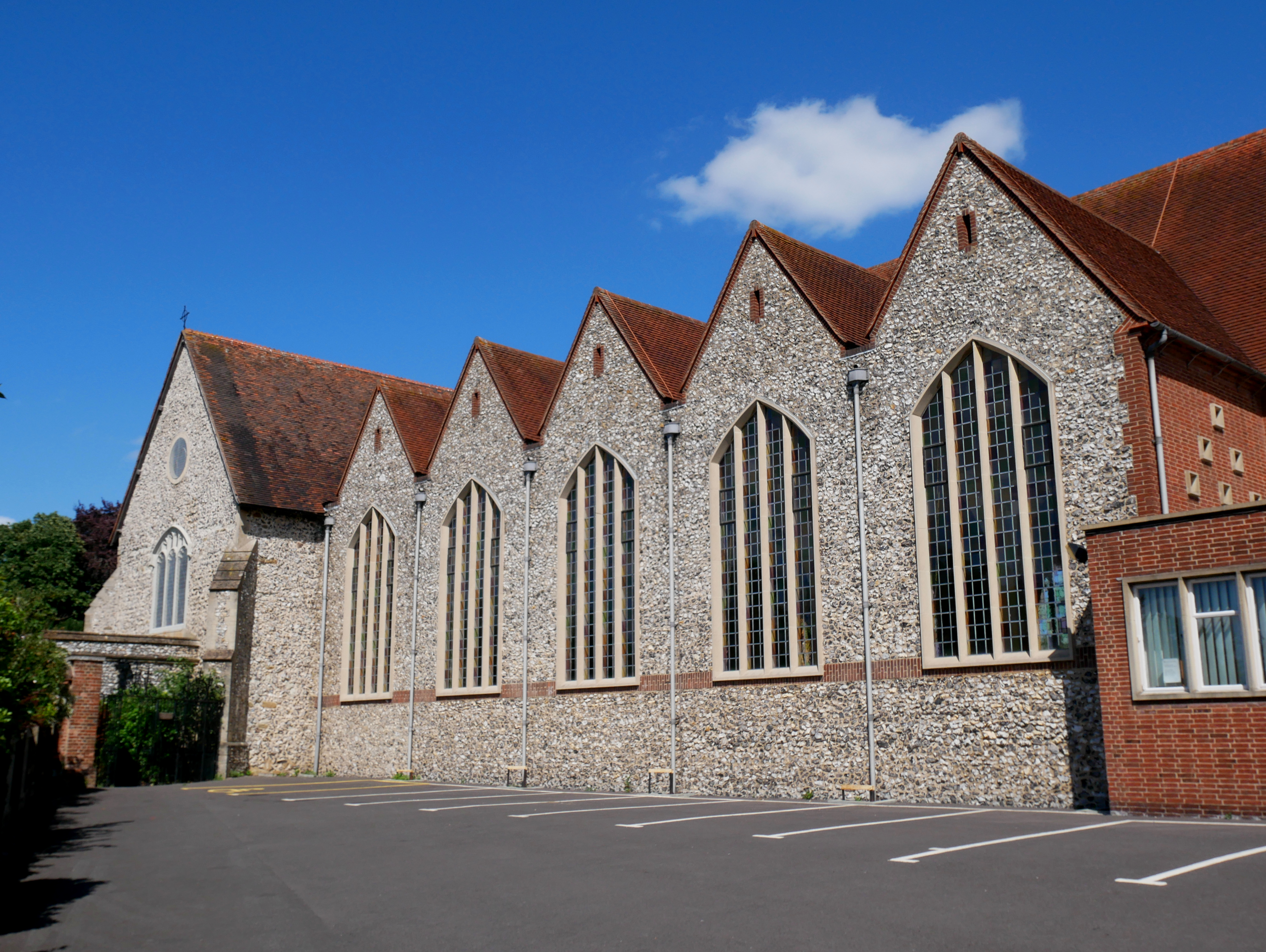
All Saints Church

The Parish Church is All Saints Church, which stands upon pre-Norman foundations. Mentioned in the Domesday Book, it is Early English in style, but some Saxon work is still visible. It was endowed by the Archbishop of Canterbury in 1173. The tower and steeple were damaged by a storm in 1771. The rebuilt steeple was struck by lightning in 1809, and it was not replaced. The church was greatly enlarged in 1957. The present Vicar is the Reverend George Rogers.

=== The Priory ===
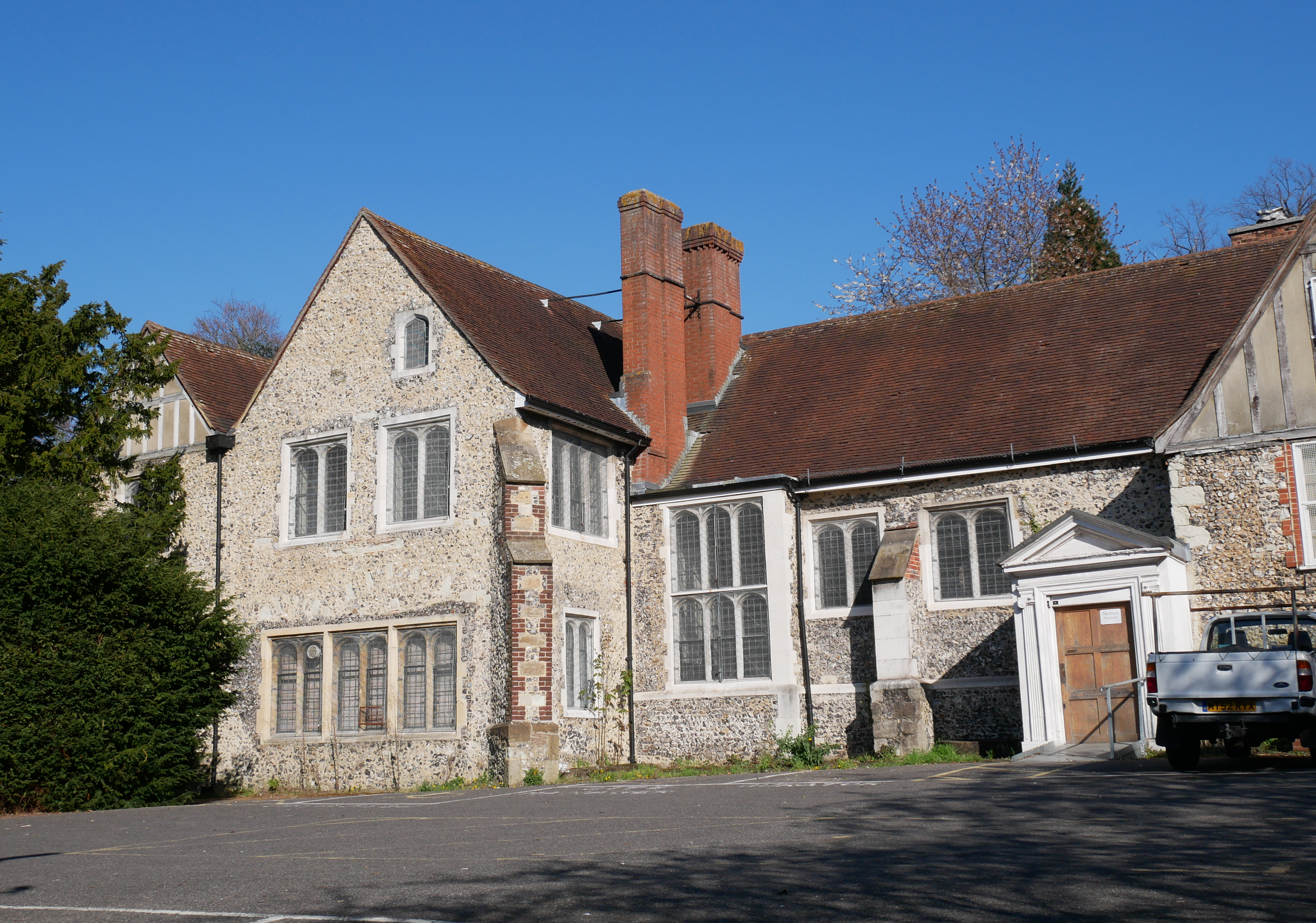
The west face of Orpington Priory

The Priory is a medieval hall house. In 1032, Eadsy, chaplain to King Cnut, gave his estate at Orpedingetune to Christ Church Priory, Canterbury. The first Rector of Orpington, Hugh de Mortimer, held court here in 1270. The house was rebuilt in 1290, this time in stone, and extended in 1393 and 1471. In the 17th century the house ceased to be a rectory and passed into private ownership; a timber-framed extension was added, which no longer exists. The house was acquired by Orpington Urban District Council in 1947, and used to house a museum which closed in September 2015 for cost reasons.

=== Priory Gardens ===
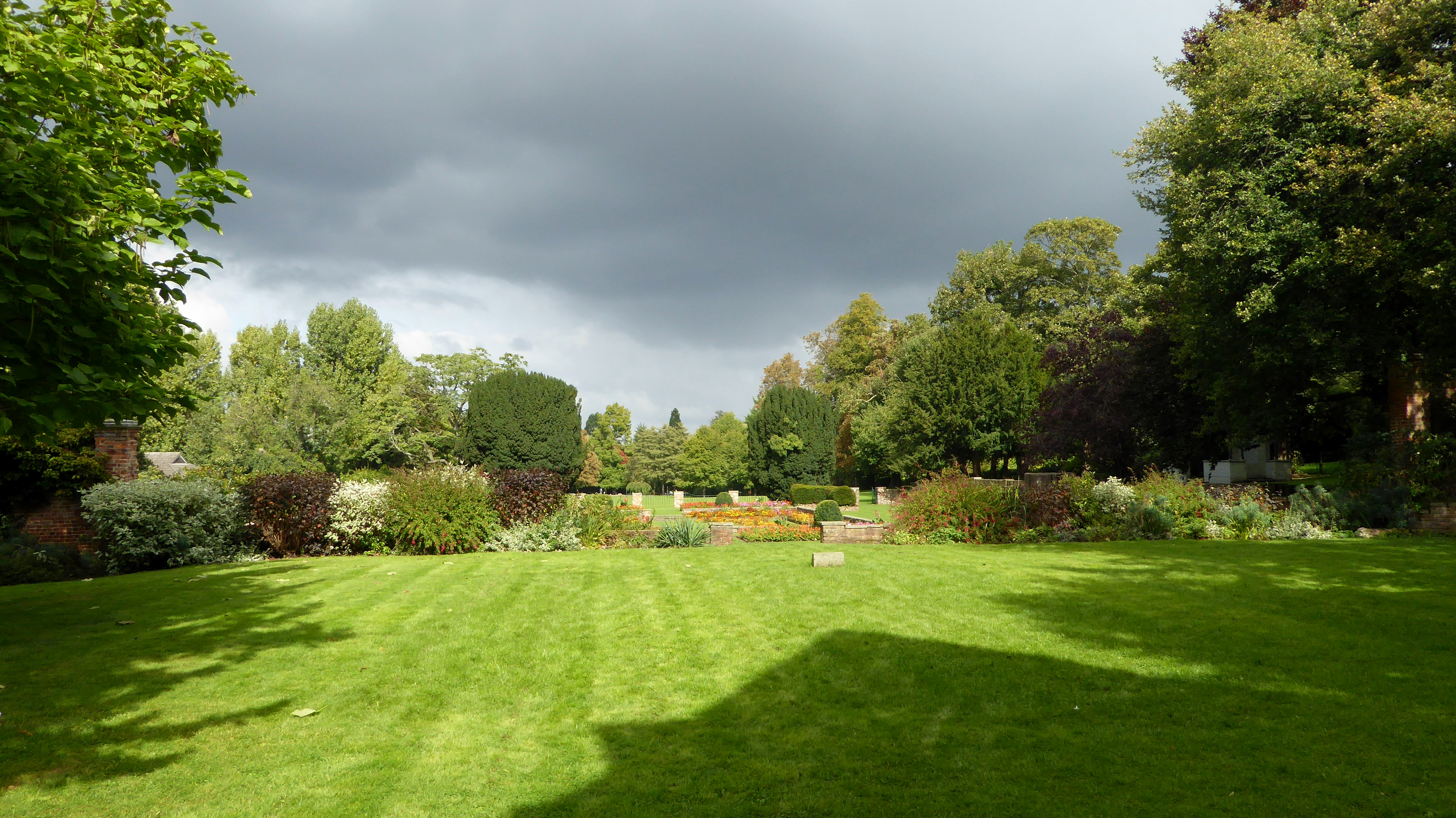
The Priory Garden at Orpington

The Grade II listed Priory Gardens designed by the last private owners of The Priory, Cecil and Lilian Hughes, consists of Italianate and Arts & Crafts style formal gardens reflecting the Hughes respective interests, a landscaped park with children's play area, and a trio of natural ponds where the River Cray rises. Each year the Orpington May Queen is crowned in the gardens.

=== Orpington Hospital ===
During the First World War a large military hospital, the "16th Canadian General", was built south-east of the station, funded by the government of Ontario, Canada. It originally accommodated 1,050 patients; an extra wing was added in 1917. By January 1919 more than 25,000 wounded soldiers had been treated here. Most of the original pre-fabricated buildings remained in use for more than 80 years before a major renovation around the turn of the century. Today Orpington Hospital provides rehabilitation and therapy services, outpatient and diagnostic services (including dermatology and diabetes), but it no longer has an Accident and Emergency Unit. The nearest A&E is Princess Royal University Hospital in Farnborough.

=== Orpington War Memorial ===
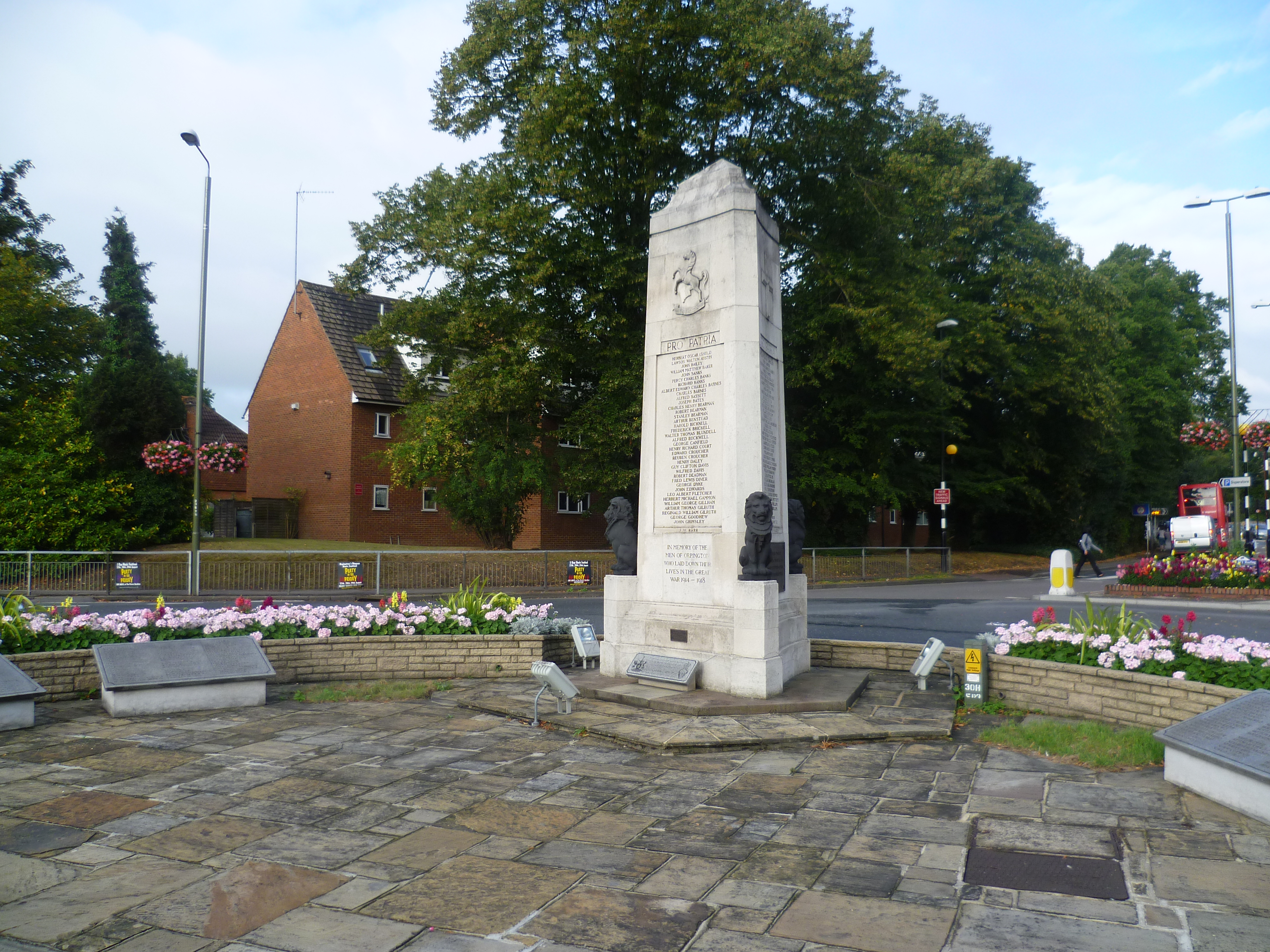
Orpington War Memorial

Orpington War Memorial standing at the southern end of the High Street is a focal point for Remembrance Sunday. It was designed by local architect Charles Heaton Comyn and unveiled on Sunday 28 August 1921. It originally contained the names of 111 local men who died in the Great War, however further names were added later, bringing the total for the Great War up to 117.

A campaign in 1997–98 for the remembrance of 432 armed forces personnel who fell in the Second World War resulted in the unveiling of eight more plaques on Sunday 2 August 1999. Another new plaque has been added detailing the eight local men who have died on active duty since 1945.

=== Canadian Corner ===
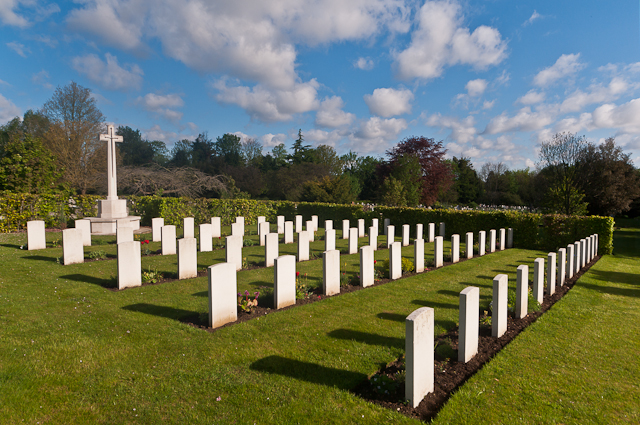
The Memorial Cross which stands in Canadian Corner

In the corner of All Saints' Church sits Canadian Corner. This is a First World War memorial that marks where 182 soldiers who died being treated at Orpington Hospital are buried. The name derives from the fact 88 of those buried are Canadians. Canadian Corner is unique in that its design resembles that of First World War Cemeteries found in France and Belgium, with the text on the memorial suggesting that the Memorial Cross was the first outside of the Western Front, as the English public were interested in how the war cemeteries looked. The Memorial Cross in Canadian Corner was unveiled in 1921 in the presence of the High Commissioner for Canada. The automatic plunger used to release the Union flag which hid the Cross was the same used by George V during the unveiling of The Cenotaph a year earlier. The Memorial Cross in Canadian Corner was the first Canadian Memorial unveiled in the UK.

== Popular culture ==
=== Orpington chicken and duck ===
Orpington is known for the "Buff", "Black" and "Speckled" chickens bred locally by William Cook in the 1890s. One could see the Buff Orpington at Tripes Farm, Chelsfield Lane until the late 1990s when the chicken coop was removed from the farm. Buff Orpington Ducks were also developed by Cook. The town still has a pub called The Buff, originally named in honour of the Buff Orpington.

=== Orpington car ===
The Orpington Car, designed by Frank Smith and built by Smith & Milroy Ltd at their works in Wellington Road, was shown at the 1920 Motor Show. It was a two-seater convertible, with a dickey seat, and a 10 horsepower (7.5 kW) engine. Although briefly successful, Smith and Milroy could not compete with mass production, and the last car was commonly believed to have been built in 1925. The only known survivor at the time reportedly once appeared in the 1970s television series Crossroads, but this has not been substantiated. There are now no known surviving examples.

=== Orpington man ===
Journalists in the 1960s used "Orpington man" to designate a typical member of the lower middle class, for example as the target audience of an electoral or advertising appeal.

=== TV appearances ===
- Areas of Orpington were used as filming locations for the 1978 crime film Give Us Tomorrow.
- Who Believes In Orpington was a series about the role of the church in contemporary suburban life. Aired February 1988.
- The Save the Children shop in Orpington High Street was the subject of Mary Queen of Charity Shops, where Mary Portas set out to improve the takings and image of the charity shop. Aired June 2009 on BBC2.
- A British Sky TV promo live-action recreation of The Simpsons opening sequence was partly filmed in Lansdowne Avenue, Orpington.
- Forest Way, Orpington was the filming location for the tree scene in the 2020 John Lewis Christmas advert.

== Notable people ==
- Gilderoy Scamp (1812-1893) - King of the Romani, born in Orpington.
- Neil Taylor (b. 1959) - cricketer, born in Orpington.
- Dina Asher-Smith (b. 1995) - sprinter, born and grew up in Orpington.
- Allan Octavian Hume (1829-1912) - notable ornithologist and founder of the Indian National Congress.
- Jeremy Barnes (b. 1970) - cricketer and clergyman.
- Jeremy Beadle (1948-2008) - TV presenter, writer and producer, attended Orpington County Secondary Boys' School.
- Steve Bennett (b. 1961) - football referee, lives in Orpington.
- Kevin Bishop (b. 1980) - actor and comedian, grew up in the area.
- Tony Cascarino (b. 1962) - footballer, grew up in Orpington.
- Len Choules (b. 1932) - footballer, born in Orpington.
- Joe Choong (b. 1995) - athlete, born in Orpington.
- Lesley Collier (b. 1947) - ballet dancer, born in Orpington.
- Patience Darton (1911-1996) - nurse and political activist, notably during the Spanish Civil War, who was born in Orpington.
- Frank Everist (1885-1945) - footballer, born in Orpington.
- Nigel Farage (b. 1964) - politician.
- David Ford (b. 1951) - politician and Northern Ireland Justice Minister, born and grew up in Orpington.
- Joan Glass (1915-2012) - textile designer and painter, born in Orpington.
- Andy Green (b. 1962) - fighter pilot and world Land Speed Record holder, attended St Olave's Grammar School.
- Ben Greenhalgh (b. 1992) - footballer and winner of Football's Next Star, born in Orpington.
- Jonathan Haggerty (b. 1997) - Muay Thai fighter, grew up in Orpington.
- Pamela Harrison (1915-1990) - pianist and composer, born in Orpington.
- Billy Idol (b. 1955) - singer, spent part of his childhood in the town.
- Emma Johnson (b. 1966) - clarinettist and BBC Young Musician of the Year in 1984, attended school in Orpington.
- Nic Jones (b. 1947)- folk singer, born in Orpington.
- Barry Knight (b. 1960) - football referee.
- Nish Kumar (b. 1985) – comedian, attended St Olave's Grammar School.
- Josie Long (b. 1982) - comedian, grew up in the town.
- Eric Lubbock (1928-2016) - politician and civil rights campaigner, local MP for a period.
- Scott Minto (b. 1971) - footballer, (including for Charlton Athletic) and TV presenter, President of Orpington Rovers FC.
- David Nobbs, Writer, born Orpington, 1935
- Tim Page (b. 1944) - photographer, grew up in Orpington.
- Stuart Pigott (b. 1960) - wine critic and author, born in the town.
- Claire Rafferty (b. 1989) - footballer, grew up in the town.
- Vezey Raffety (1906-1901) - cricketer.
- Gary Rhodes (1960-2019) - TV chef, lived in the area.
- Hubert Shirley-Smith (1901-1981) - civil engineer, lived in Orpington in the latter part of his life.
- Max Splodge - singer in Splodgenessabounds, grew up in the town.

=== Notable animals ===
- Flossie (cat) (b. 1995) - The oldest living cat currently alive, as of 2024, living in Orpington.

== Sources ==
- Trevor Mulligan (2012). Rediscovering... The Orpington Car. Timeline Books. ISBN 978-0-9573129-0-6.
- Dorothy Cox (1983). The Book of Orpington. Barracuda Books. ISBN 0-86023-164-X.
- John Edwards (1991). A Look Back at Orpington. Bromley Leisure Services. ISBN 0-901002-13-5.
