= Bromley and Sheppard's Colleges =

Coordinates: 51.408°N 0.012°E

Bromley and Sheppard's Colleges are located in Bromley and today provide accommodation for retired clergy and their dependents. Bromley College provides 40 self-contained dwellings, and Sheppard's College a further seven. Founded in the 17th century, with later additions and extensions, the property includes three listed buildings.

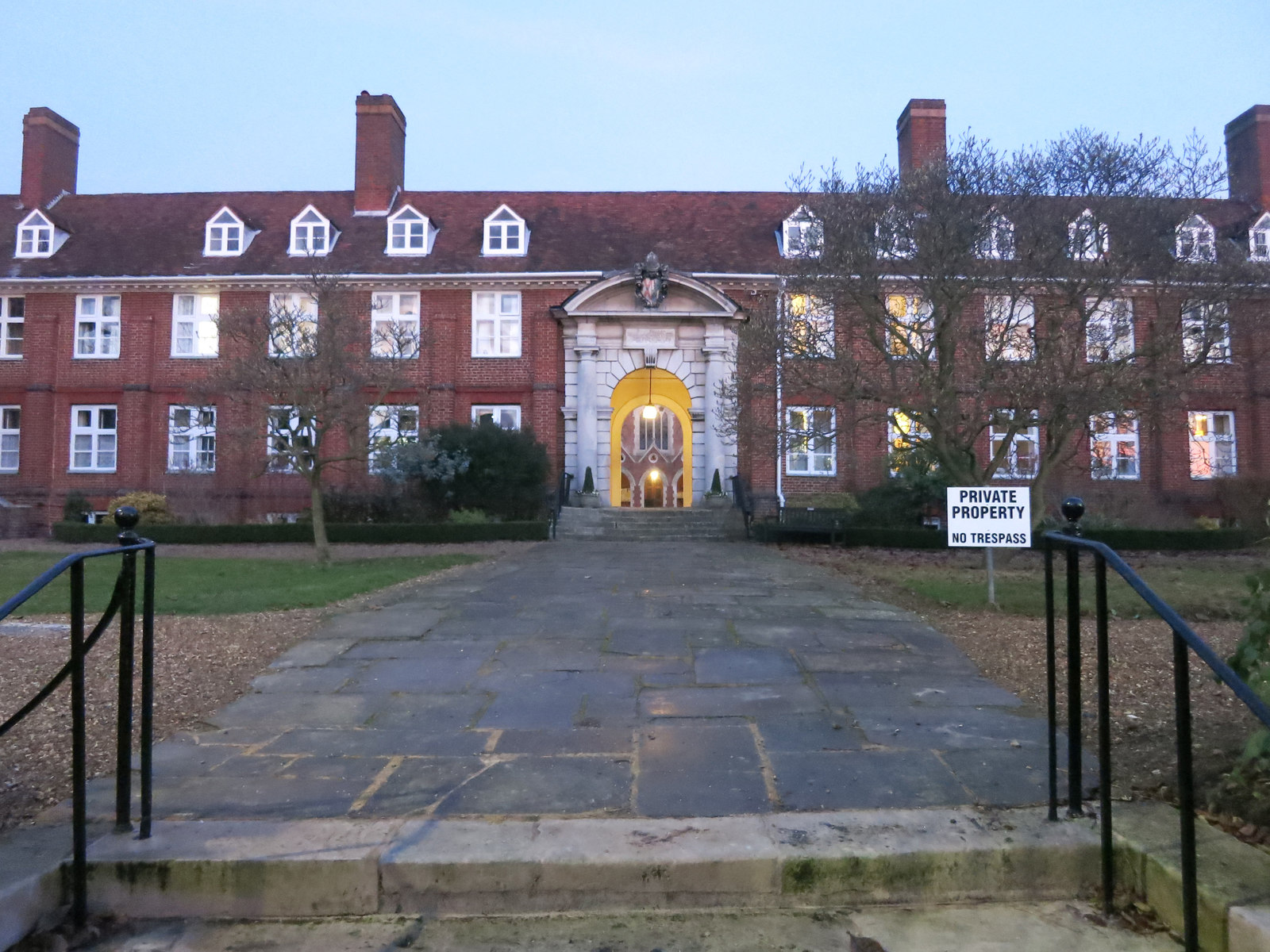
Bromley College

== Bromley College ==
Bishop of Rochester's Charities Act 1670
- Act of Parliament
- Parliament of England
- Long title: An Act for settling certain Charitable Uses devised by John late Bishop of Rochester.
- Citation: 22 Cha. 2. c. 2 Pr.
- Territorial extent: England and Wales

Dates
- Royal assent: 11 April 1670
- Commencement: 14 February 1670 (Note: Start of session.)

Status: Current legislation

Bromley College was founded in 1666 by the Will of John Warner, Bishop of Rochester, to provide housing for "twenty poore widowes of orthodoxe and loyall clergiemen.”, which was supported by his estate at Swaton. Warner's wish was for it to be built near to Rochester but, as no suitable site could be found there, Parliament passed in 1670 the Bishop of Rochester's Charities Act 1670 (22 Cha. 2. c. 2 Pr.) to enable the college to be built anywhere within the diocese. Numerous others have since contributed further funds for expansion, maintenance and other expenses.

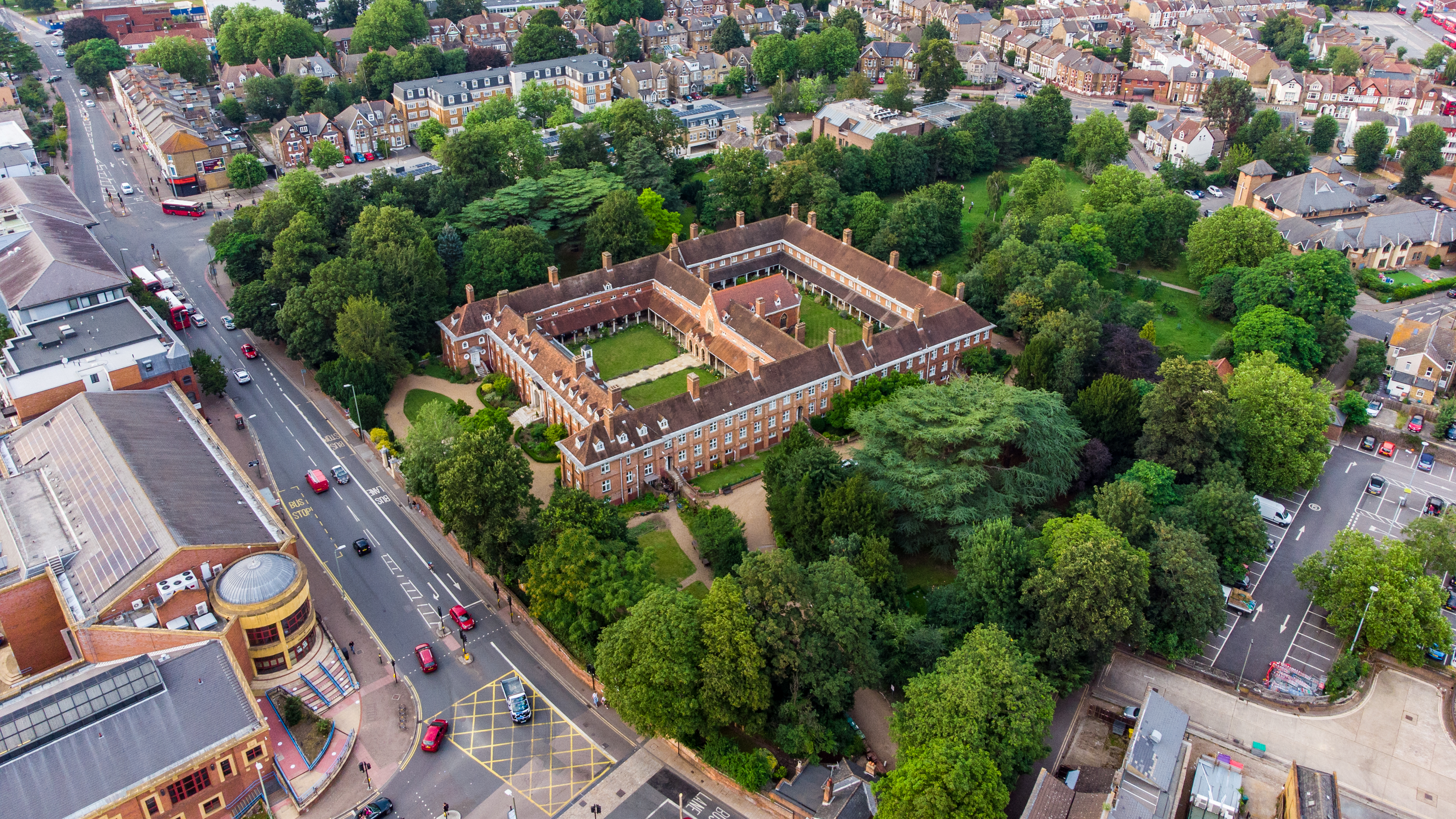
Bromley College from the air.

The almshouses were built in 1670–72 around a quadrangle. A second quadrangle was instigated under the direction of Zachary Pearce, and completed in 1805. After 1821 land to the east was purchased and improvements were made in the grounds.

It is a Grade I listed building, as is a gateway leading on to High Street. It is the oldest building in Bromley.

== Sheppard's College ==
Sheppard's College was built in the grounds of Bromley College in 1840 by a Mrs Sheppard, sister of the President of Magdalen College, Oxford, to provide accommodation for daughters who had lived with their mothers in Bromley College. It is a Grade II listed building comprising a terrace of five houses in Tudor Gothic style, the central house being set forward from the others.

== Bromley and Sheppard's Colleges Charity ==
The organisation is registered charity # 210337 with the Charity Commission for England and Wales. Its purpose is to provide housing for retired Church of England clergy and their spouses, retired widows and widowers of clerks, a divorced or separated spouse of a clerk or the unmarried child or step-child of a deceased collegian. A preference is given to those who have held office in the Diocese of Rochester.

It is run by a body of trustees which includes ex-officio positions assigned to the Archbishop of Canterbury, the Bishop of London, the Bishop of Rochester, the Dean of St Paul's, the Archdeacon of Bromley and Bexley and the Chancellor of the Diocese of Rochester. Some of these appoint deputies who manage the college with seven more co-opted trustees, while day-to-day administration is the responsibility of the Chaplain.
