= Ashburton =

Ashburton may refer to:

== Australia ==
- Ashburton, Victoria, a suburb of Melbourne
  - Ashburton railway station, Melbourne
- Shire of Ashburton, a shire in Western Australia
  - Electoral district of Ashburton, a former state electorate in Western Australia
- Ashburton River (Western Australia), river in the Pilbara

== New Zealand ==
- Ashburton, New Zealand, a town in Canterbury
  - Ashburton Aerodrome, a small airport serving Ashburton
  - Ashburton County, was one of the counties of New Zealand
  - Ashburton District, which replaced Ashburton borough and county
  - Ashburton (New Zealand electorate), a former electorate in New Zealand
- Ashburton River / Hakatere, river in the South Island

== South Africa ==
- Ashburton, KwaZulu-Natal, a town in South Africa

== United Kingdom ==
- Ashburton, Devon, a town in England
  - Ashburton (UK Parliament constituency), a former UK Parliamentary constituency
  - Ashburton railway station
- Ashburton, London, an area in the London Borough of Croydon, England
  - Ashburton (ward), a ward in the London Borough of Croydon, England
  - Ashburton Grove, the location of the Emirates Stadium, home of London's Arsenal Football Club
  - Ashburton Learning Village, in Croydon

== United States ==
- Ashburton, Baltimore, Maryland, a neighborhood

== See also ==
- Baron Ashburton, British title
- Ashburton (Jersey) Limited
- Ashburton River (disambiguation)
