= Ashburton (ward) =

Electoral ward in Croydon, London, England

Coordinates: 51.385°N 0.057°W

- Former ward for Croydon Council
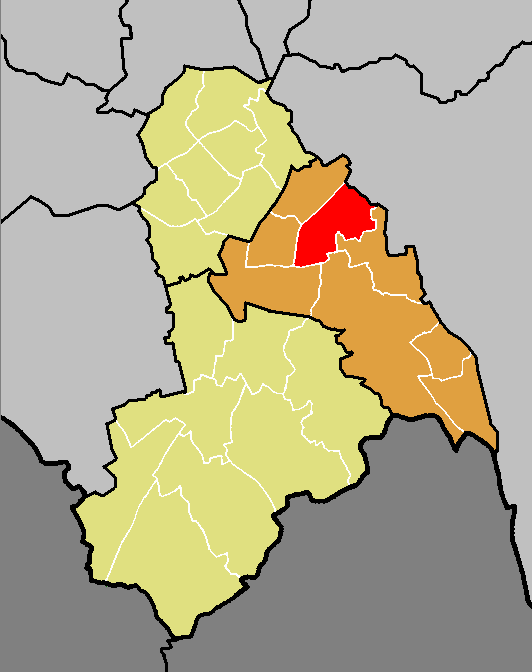
- Boundary of Ashburton in Croydon from 2002 to 2018.
- County: Greater London

1978–2018
- Number of councillors: Three
- Replaced by: Addiscombe East
- UK Parliament constituency: Croydon Central

Ashburton was a ward in the London Borough of Croydon, in London in the United Kingdom. The ward covered the Ashburton area, as well as covering the main retail area of Addiscombe, the Stroud Green, Tollgate and Longheath Garden estates, and large parts of northern Shirley. The population of the ward at the 2011 Census was 14,721.

The ward formed part of the Croydon Central constituency, which was one of the most marginal in the country, 165 votes separating the Conservatives and Labour at the 2015 General Election.

The ward returned three councillors every four years to Croydon Council. At the 2014 London local elections Maddie Henson, Stephen Mann, and Andrew Rendle were elected to the council achieving a 9% swing. All of them were running as Labour Party candidates.

== Area description ==
Ashburton was named after Ashburton House, one of the three big houses in the Addiscombe area. Ashburton Park was opened on the site of Stroud Green House, which was later developed into a boys’ home and convent. The former Ashburton Library was housed in the convent's chapel and dormitory buildings. The library is part of the new Ashburton Learning Village round the corner.

The area's only claim to national fame came in 1866 when part of Stroud Green Farm was leased as a race course and for some years crowds flocked to the area on race days. Woodside railway station, opened in 1871, owes its existence to these crowds. It was so constructed that horses could be brought by rail to the course. The race course closed in 1890 but the station continued in service until the arrival of tram services.

A new state-of-the-art centre, the Ashburton Learning Village, was opened in Ashburton on the old A Block of a secondary school in 2005. This includes the Ashburton Library, Oasis Academy Shirley Park and rooms used for adult learning and public and private clubs. The centre also has a car park and large sport facilities. The design has been described as eco-friendly and shaped as if it holds a swimming pool.

== Ward result ==
Croydon Council Election 2010: Ashburton (3)
Party	Candidate	Votes	%	±%
Conservative	Edwin S. Arram	3,175		
Conservative	Avril E.M. Slipper	2,974		
Conservative	Adam Kellett	2,866		
Labour	Mark Justice	2,234		
Labour	Madelaine R. Goulder	2,206		
Labour	Shorish Barzinji	1,979		
Liberal Democrats	Peter S. Ladanyi	1,290		
Green	Bernice C. Goldberg	647		
UKIP	David M. Aina	557		
BNP	Tony L. Martin	419		
Green	Tim Fernandes-Bonnar	407		
Green	Sergio M. Petro	385		
Turnout		7,056	66.6%	▲23.9%
Registered electors		11,774		
Conservative hold		Swing		
Conservative hold		Swing		
Conservative hold		Swing		

Croydon Council Election 2006: Ashburton
Party	Candidate	Votes	%	±%
Conservative	Lindsay Frost	2,513		
Conservative	Eddy Arram	2,431		
Conservative	Avril Slipper	2,390		
Labour	Rona MacDonald	1,057		
Labour	Peter Spalding	971		
Labour	Jitinder Singh	904		
Green	Bernice Golberg	628		
Liberal Democrats	Nirma Ramful	550		
UKIP	Jeanette Nathan	336		
Turnout		4,324	42.7%	
Conservative hold		Swing		
Conservative hold		Swing		
Conservative hold		Swing		
