= Ashburton Playing Fields =

Playing field in Woodside, London

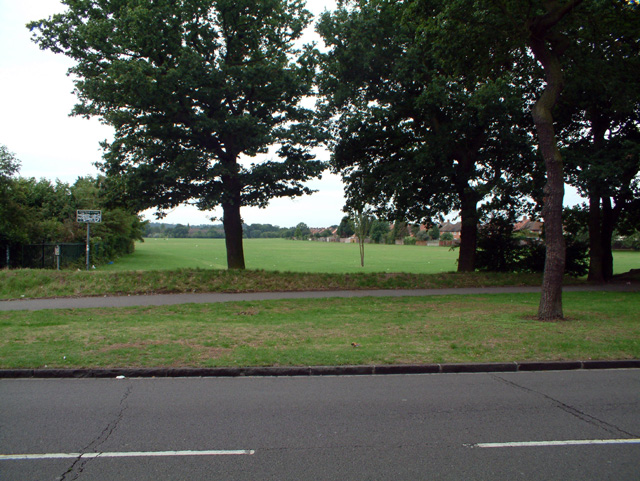
- Ashburton Playing Fields
- Interactive map of Ashburton Playing Fields
- Type: Playing field
- Location: Woodside
- Nearest city: London
- Coordinates: 51.3844°N 0.0546°W
- Area: 49.5 acres (20.0 ha)
- Operator: London Borough of Croydon
- Open: 24 hours per day

Ashburton Playing Fields is a playing field located in Woodside, London. It is managed by the London Borough of Croydon. The fields are bordered by Bywood Avenue in the north, Chaucer Green in the west and Woodville Avenue in the east. Stroud Green Way backs onto the western boundary. Tramlink services for the park are Arena and Woodside. It covers an area of 49.5 acres (20 ha).

Facilities include football and cricket pitches, changing rooms, and children's playground. The fields are open 24 hours per day throughout the year, although pitches and use of changing rooms have to be booked in advance.

== See also ==
- List of Parks and Open Spaces in Croydon
- Ashburton Park
- Ashburton
- Croydon Sports Arena
