= Ashburton Park =

Park in Woodside, London, England

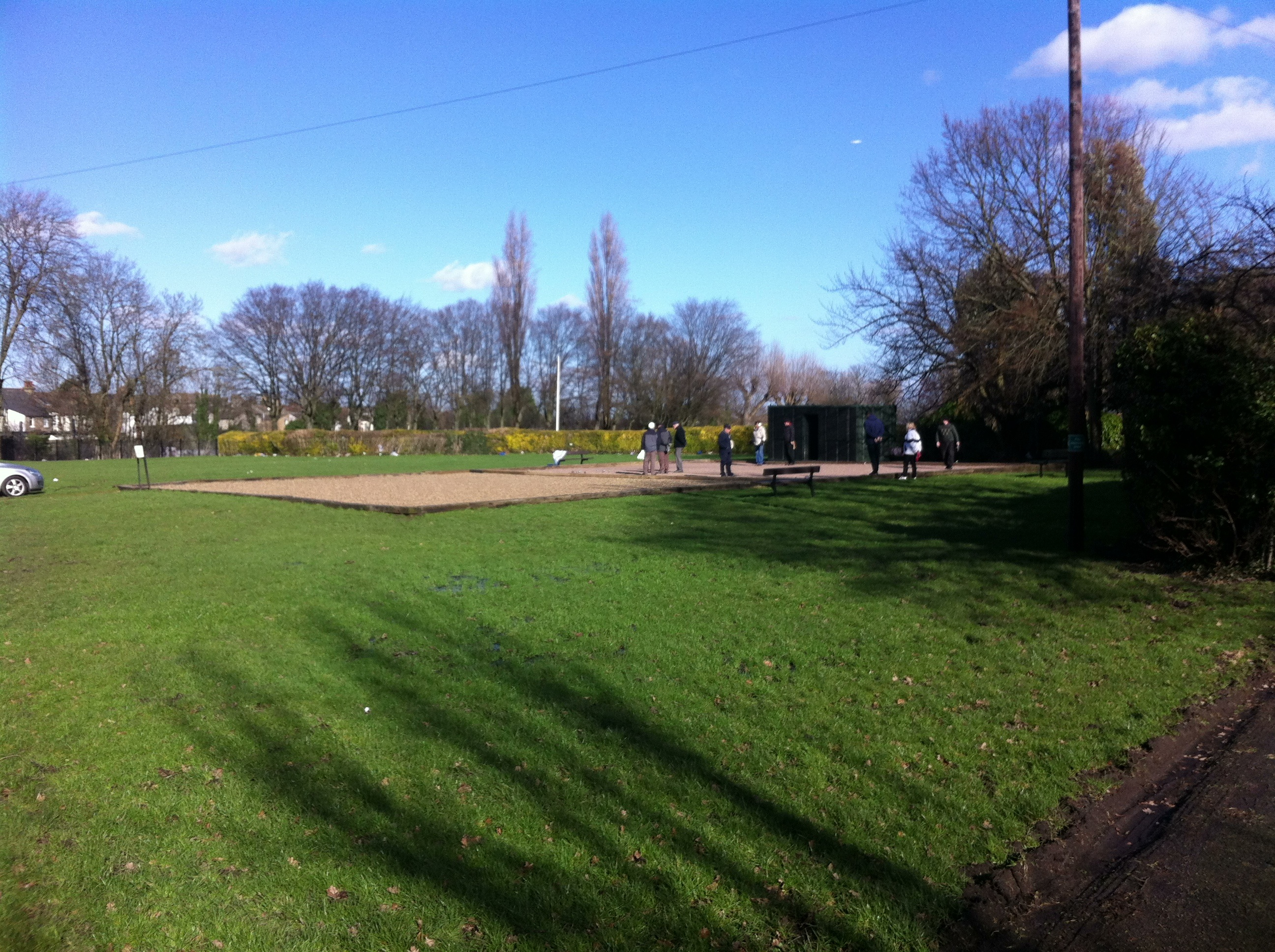
- Ashburton Park pétanque terrain
- Interactive map of Ashburton Park
- Type: Park
- Location: Woodside
- Nearest city: London Borough of Croydon, UK
- Coordinates: 51.38519°N 0.06709°W
- Area: 18.5 acres (7.5 ha)
- Created: 1924
- Open: All year (closed at night)

Ashburton Park is a park located in Woodside, in the London Borough of Croydon, and takes its name from nearby Ashburton.

The park is located close to Woodside tram stop, where Tramlink services the park. It is on the junction of Lower Addiscombe Road and Spring Lane. The park covers an area of 18.5 acres (7.5 ha) and includes a village green, pétanque terrain, bowling green, tennis and basketball courts and a café.

== History ==
The site was once the location of Woodside Convent, and the property has changed hands many times since then. A mansion was built on the site in 1788. Croydon Corporation bought the house and grounds by Compulsory Purchase Order in 1924. Most of the buildings were torn down, with a putting green (no longer there) being laid on the site. The only remaining part of the house was the c. 1878 extension which became Ashburton Library. The library was relocated in 2006–2007 to the nearby Ashburton School and the building fell into disrepair.

Despite the neglect of the café and former library building the local council have spent some money on renovating the public toilets, improving the children's playing park and adding some features for joggers and fun runners on the perimeter paths.

The Friends of Ashburton Park group, launched in September 2013, have come together to put the former library back into community use.

In December 2017, the park was due to host the Croydon Winter Festival, with seasonal events including ice-skating.

== See also ==
- List of Parks and Open Spaces in Croydon
- Woodside Green
- Ashburton Learning Village
- Brickfields Meadow
- South Norwood Country Park
- South Norwood Recreation Ground
- South Norwood Lake and Grounds
- South Norwood
