= Harrington Road tram stop =

Tramlink tram stop in London, England

Harrington Road
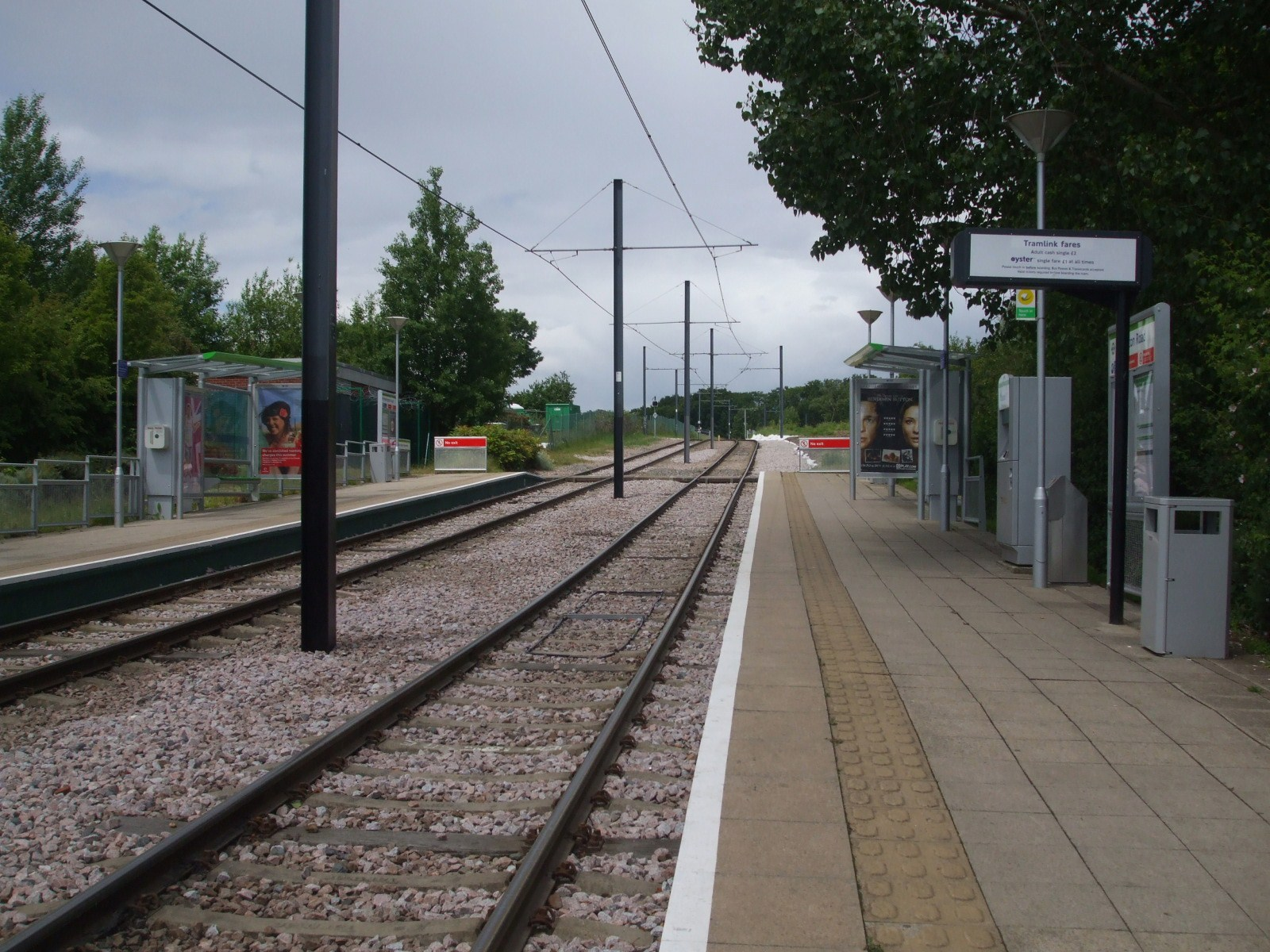
- Looking north

General information
- Location: Harrington Road, Croydon
- Coordinates: 51.3997°N 0.0605°W
- Operated by: Tramlink
- Platforms: 2

Construction
- Structure type: At-grade
- Accessible: Yes

Other information
- Status: Unstaffed
- Website: Official website

History
- Opened: 23 May 2000
Location
- Location in Croydon

Harrington Road tram stop is a light rail stop in South Norwood in the London Borough of Croydon in the southern suburbs of London. Harrington Road is in a residential area, and along with Woodside tram stop is the nearest tram stop to the town of South Norwood. Beckenham Cemetery lies immediately to the east and there is an entrance immediately adjacent to the tramstop.

The tram stop, which is served by Tramlink, connects to central Croydon. The stop is at ground level on double track, with platforms on each side of the track. Immediately to the north of the stop, the route becomes single track and turns sharply to the east, joining the trackbed of the existing railway line between Crystal Palace and Beckenham Junction stations. The two tracks (Tramlink and Network Rail) run alongside each other, occupying the site of what was previously a double track railway.

Transport for London once had plans to extend the Tramlink system to Crystal Palace, which would have involved a junction to the north of Harrington Road, with the extension joining the existing railway in the opposite direction to the current service. The planned extension to Crystal Palace was formally dropped by Transport for London in 2008.

== Services ==
Harrington Road is served by tram services operated by Tramlink. The tram stop is served by trams every 10 minutes between Beckenham Junction and Wimbledon via Croydon.

On Saturday evenings and Sundays, the service is reduced to a tram every 15 minutes in each direction.

Services are operated using Bombardier CR4000 and Stadler Variobahn model low-floor trams.

Preceding station	Tramlink	Following station
Arena (Croydon) towards Wimbledon	Tramlink; Wimbledon to Beckenham Junction	Birkbeck towards Beckenham Junction
