= Woodside, London =

Area of south London, England

Coordinates: 51.387849°N 0.067509°W

Woodside
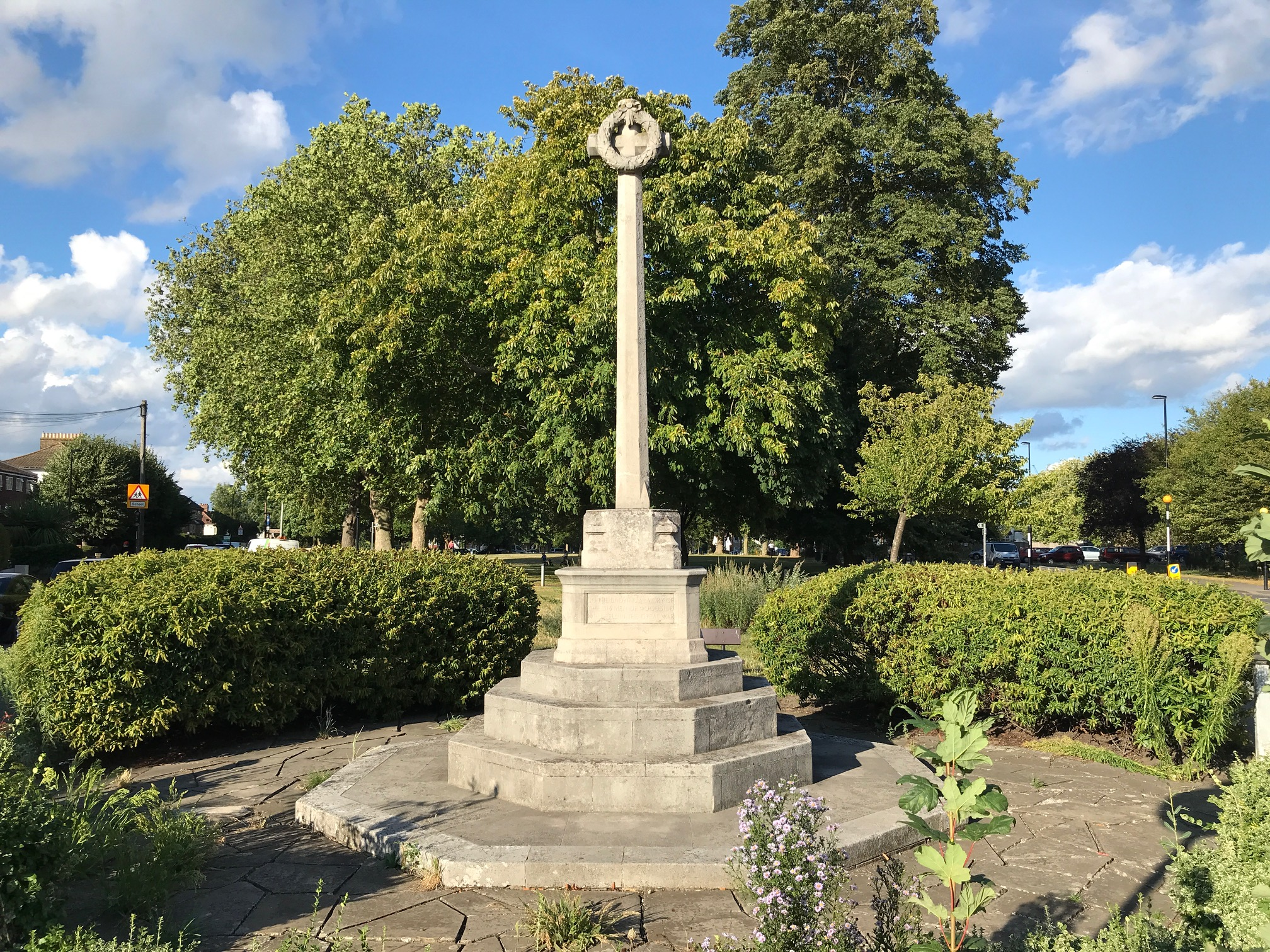
- Woodside War Memorial on Woodside Green

- Location within Greater London
- Population: 16,743 (2011 Census Ward)
- OS grid reference: TQ344672
- London borough: Croydon
- Ceremonial county: Greater London
- Region: London
- Country: England
- Sovereign state: United Kingdom
- Post town: CROYDON
- Postcode district: CR0
- Post town: LONDON
- Postcode district: SE25
- Dialling code: 020
- Police: Metropolitan
- Fire: London
- Ambulance: London
- UK Parliament: Croydon East
- London Assembly: Croydon and Sutton

Woodside is an area in south London, in the London Borough of Croydon. It is between Addiscombe and South Norwood. It is south of South Norwood, west of Shirley and Monks Orchard, north of Addiscombe, and east of Selhurst.

== History ==
Woodside was first mentioned in 1332, and is thought to signify its location adjacent to the Great North Wood, a formerly extensive forest which gives its name to the various 'Norwoods' in the area.

Woodside was historically largely agricultural land, but its heavy soil made farming difficult; local farmer William Marshall published details of his efforts in this regard in the 1780s. However the clayey soil did enable a brick-making industry to form in the area by the 1850s. A small settlement centred on Woodside Green had already sprouted up by the early 19th century. Handley's brickworks' chimneys dominated the area, their hooter being heard all over the locality at lunchtime to signify the start and finish of the rest period. Handley's was later sold to Hall & Co, who were subsequently taken over by Ready Mixed Concrete, before the brick factories closed altogether in 1974. There were two other brickyards in the group - at Newdigate and Ashford - with the managing director Jack Milsted also being Founder Chairman of Croydon Amateurs FC from 1953 until 1990, when the club was renamed as Croydon FC. After the factories closed the site was turned into Brickfields Meadow, a park containing woods and a lake.

Croydon Racecourse opened in 1866 on nearby Stroud Green Farm abutting Monks Orchard (now the site of Ashburton Community School and Ashburton Playing Fields), prompting the opening of a railway station in 1871, though the racecourse closed in 1890.

In 1871, the Ecclesiastical Commissioners granted 'copyhold' to the Croydon Local Board of Health for Woodside Green upon condition that it should be appropriated by the Board:

"to be forever kept as an open space and used as, and for, a place of recreation for the use of inhabitants of the parish of Croydon and of the neighbourhood and for no other purpose".

Four months later, the Commissioners, passed the freehold of the land to the board "freed from all incidents whatsoever of copyhold or customary tenure to be held and used for the purpose of public walks, recreation or pleasure grounds only". The area has been used by the Local Board of Health and its successors ever since.

In 1924 Croydon Council purchased a mansion in the area, tearing it down and replacing turning its grounds into a public park (Ashburton Park). An extension of the house as kept and converted into a library, however the library moved to a new site in 2006 and the building has since been renovated and renamed as Ashburton Hall.

In 2006 Ashburton Learning Village opened, containing a school and a new library.

== Amenities ==
Woodside is a nowadays a suburban district of residential streets based around Woodside Green, a 4.75 acres (1.92 ha) triangular green. At one end of the green is a war memorial. It is surrounded by residential properties, with the main shopping parade at one end. Portland Road, an important distributor road, leads away from the green towards South Norwood, and has many more shops, restaurants, pubs and a swimming pool. The green still has a somewhat villagey feel with, several old houses and cottages around it. Housing is largely Victorian terraces or more recent developments of small flats. There is one pub in the immediate area - the Joiner's Arms. Another pub - The Beehive - closed in 2017.

=== Woodside Green ===
Woodside Green is a green space and street located in Woodside. The green is located near to Woodside tram stop in the London Borough of Croydon and is over 4.75 acres (1.92 ha). An indenture of 1662 shows "land lying up on a green called Woodside Green". The Croydon Inclosure Map of 1800 shows an area "Woodside Green".

In 1871, the Ecclesiastical Commissioners granted 'copyhold' to the Croydon Local Board of Health upon condition that it should be appropriated by the Board:

"to be forever kept as an open space and used as, and for, a place of recreation for the use of inhabitants of the parish of Croydon and of the neighbourhood and for no other purpose".

Four months later, the Commissioners, passed the freehold of the land to the board "freed from all incidents whatsoever of copyhold or customary tenure to be held and used for the purpose of public walks, recreation or pleasure grounds only". The area has been used by the Local Board of Health and its successors ever since.

In 1888, the Borough of Croydon acquired the neighbouring Poplar Farm and subsequently, part of the farm was included in the grounds of the green.

The green features mature plane trees with benches beneath them. Beside the roadway which bisects the green is a stone horse- and cattle-trough. Although no longer used in respect of livestock, it is still a feature of the green.

A 1905 postcard of Woodside Green shows The Joiners Arms (Nalder & Collyer), Woodside News Agency, E Jupp Family Baker, and The Bee Hive Overton Brewery.

== Politics ==
Woodside is part of the electoral ward of Woodside, one of 28 wards in the London Borough of Croydon. The ward covers a wider area than Woodside proper, reaching up to Norwood Junction railway station and including South Norwood Country Park. The area identifying primarily as 'Woodside' has gradually shrunk, with most living within the SE25 postcode now terming themselves 'South Norwood'.

== Transport ==
The area is served by two Tramlink stops - Woodside and Blackhorse Lane.The nearest rail station is Norwood Junction, located to the north in South Norwood.

Woodside formerly had its own railway station, opened in 1871 and served by the Woodside and South Croydon Railway, however this closed in 1997 after a long period of decline. The station stood where the tram stop now is, and part of the old disused track-bed was turned into Addiscombe Railway Park.

== Gallery ==
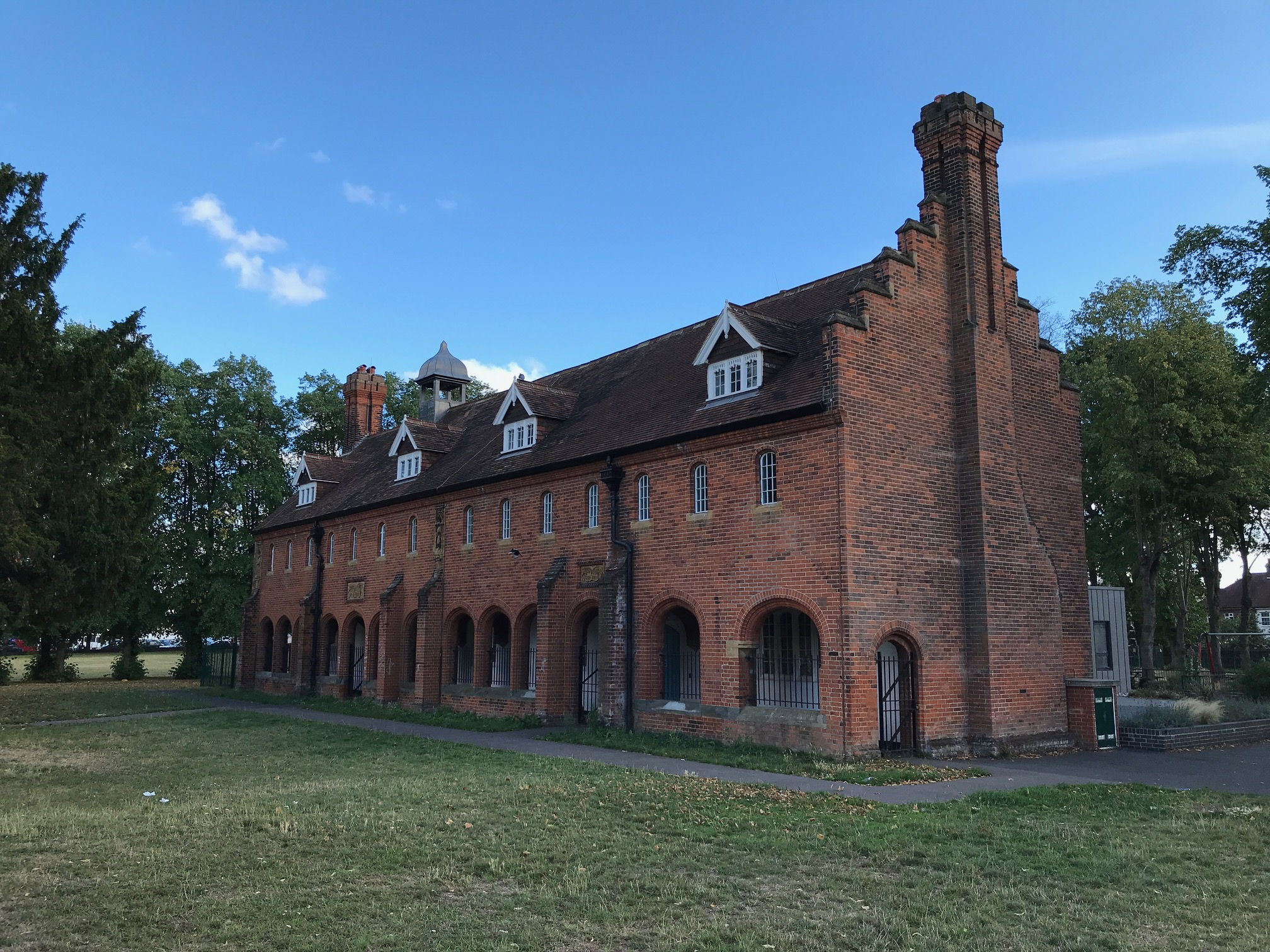
The old Ashburton Library in Ashburton Park, formerly an extension to a mansion

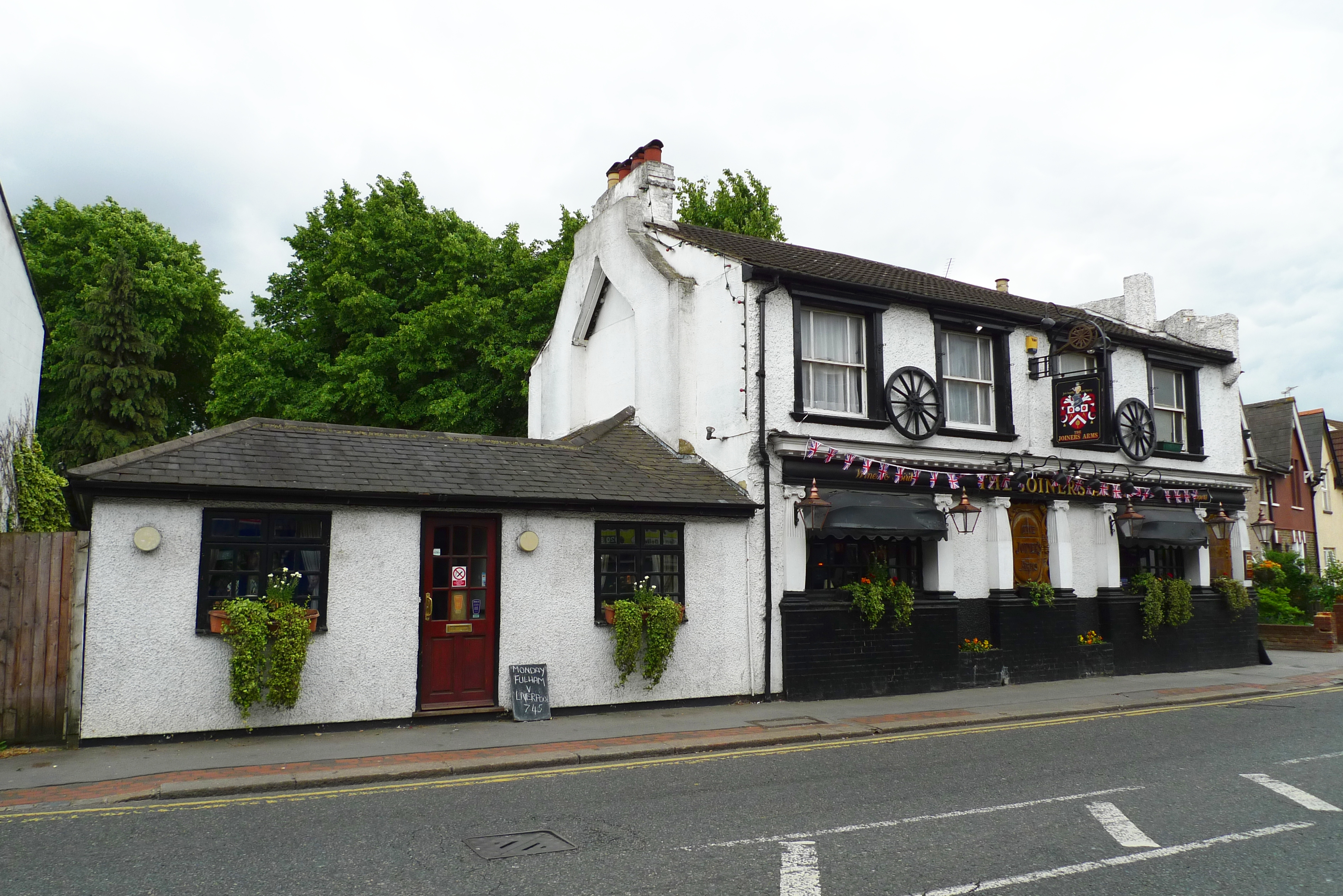
The Joiners Arms pub

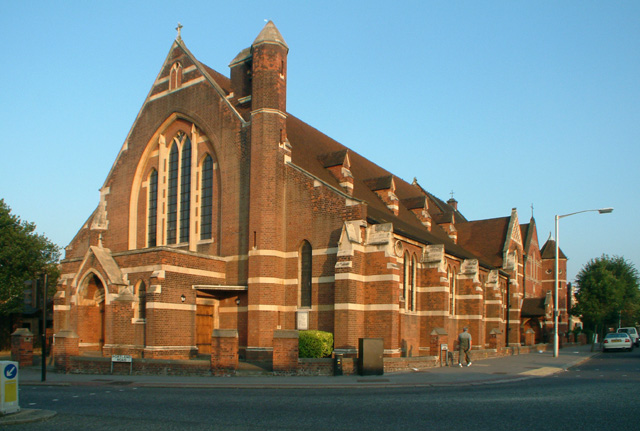
St's Luke's Church, built in 1870 with modifications in 1949, now a grade II listed building

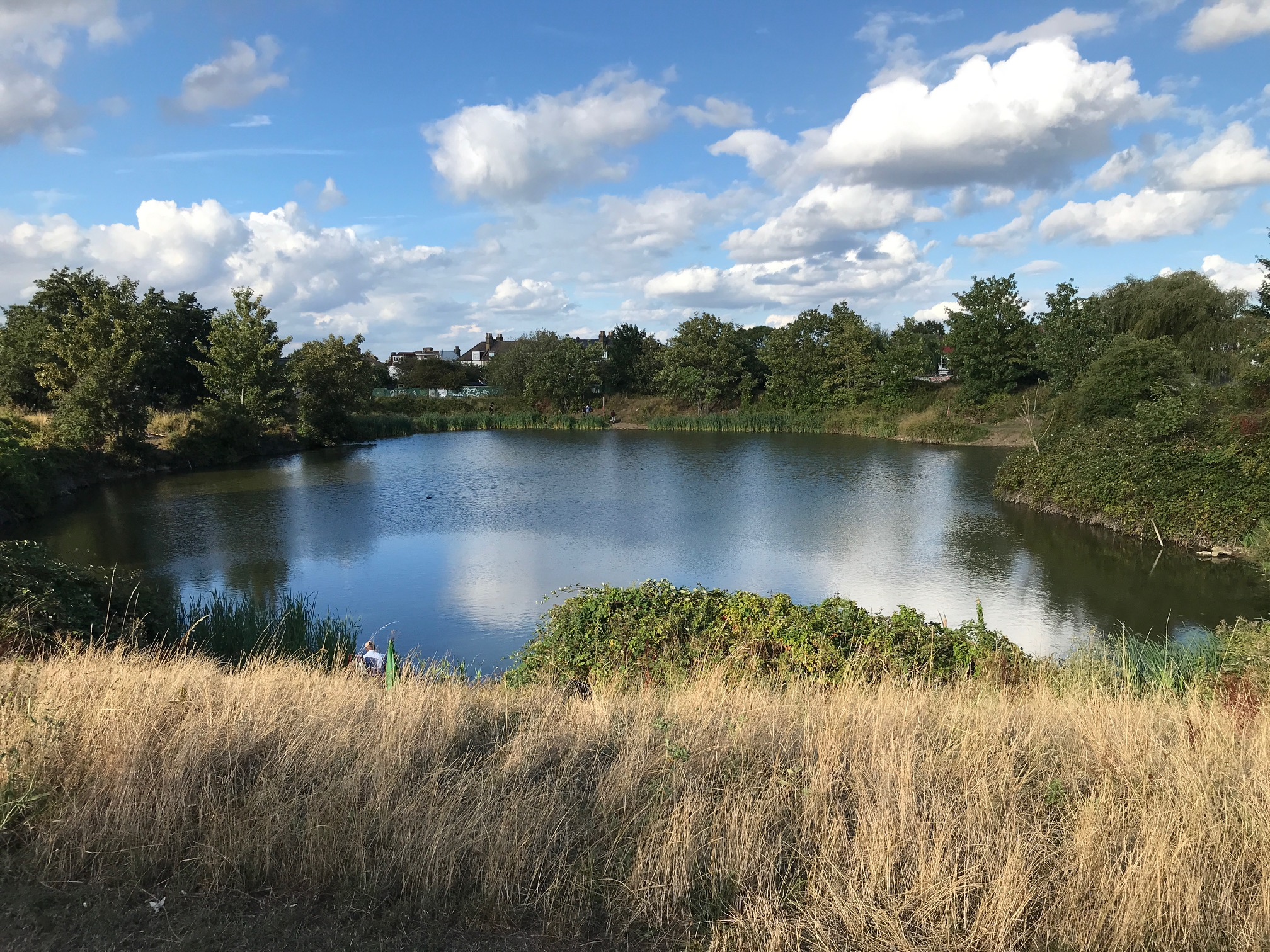
Lake in Brickfields Meadow

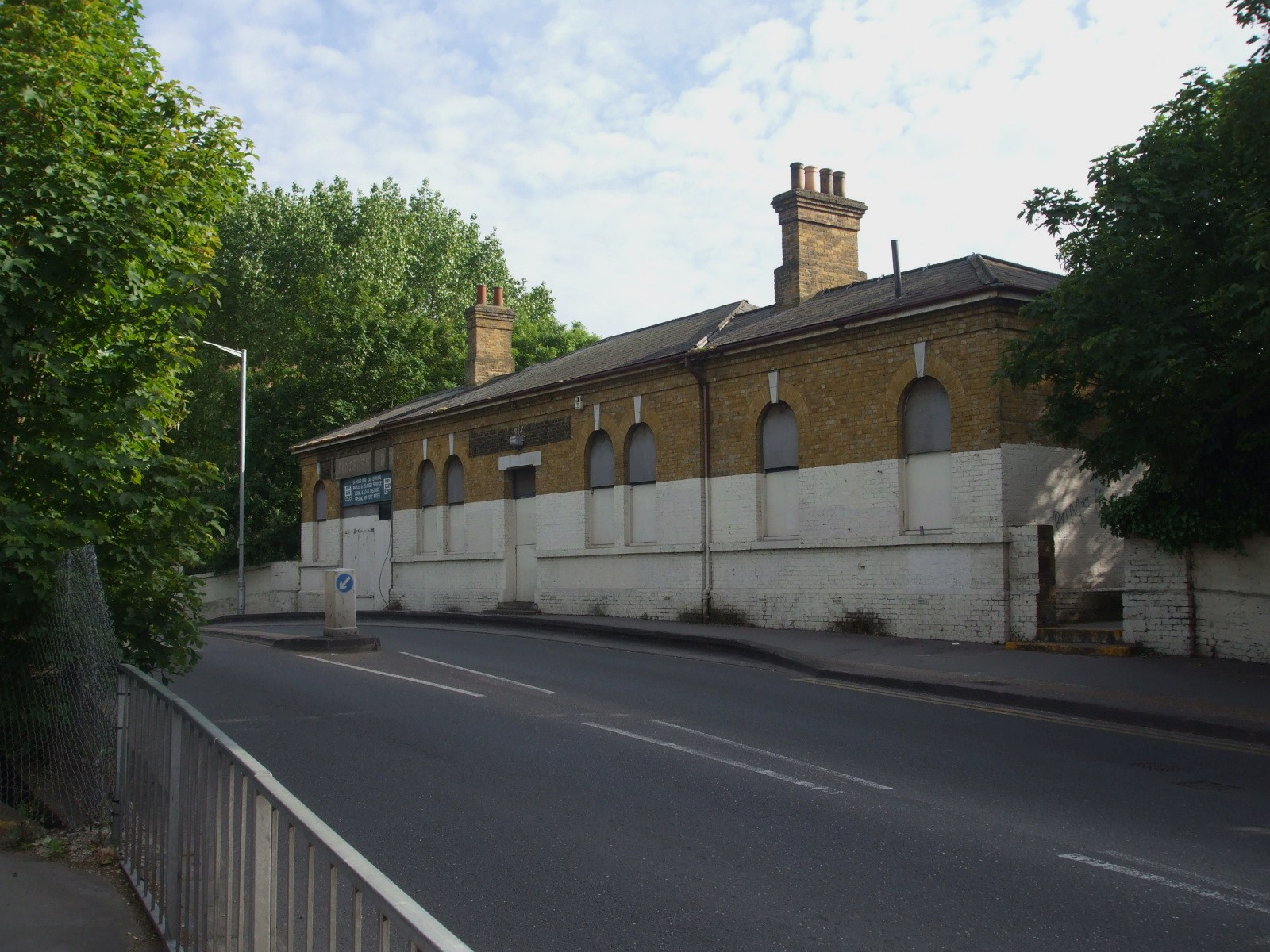
The old Woodside station building, now disused

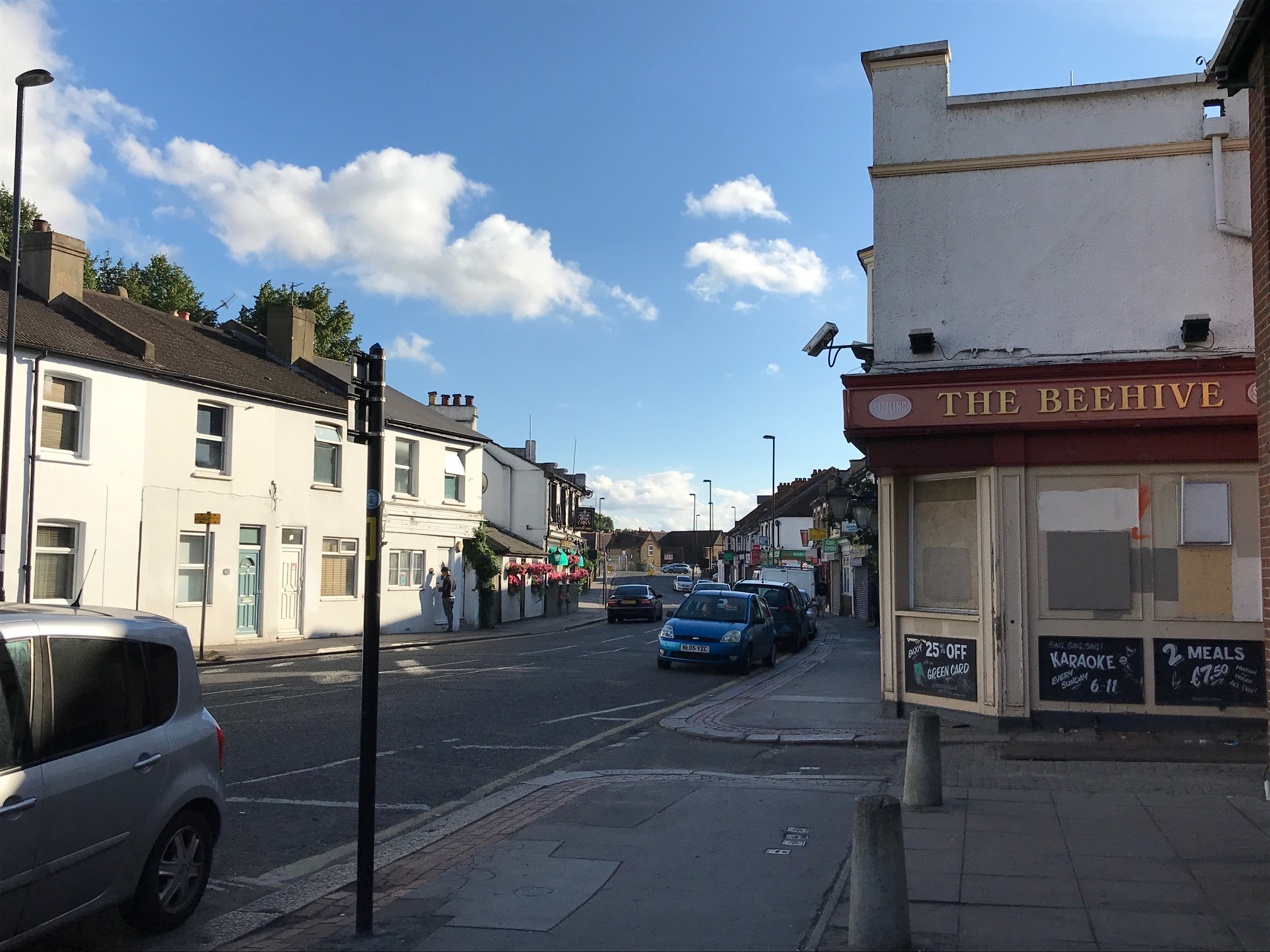
Shops on Woodside Green, with the boarded-up Beehive to the right

== See also ==
- List of Parks and Open Spaces in Croydon
  - Heavers Meadow
  - South Norwood
  - Brickfields Meadow
  - South Norwood Recreation Ground
  - Ashburton Park
