= Arena tram stop =

Arena tram stop may refer to:

- Arena tram stop (Croydon), on the Tramlink network
- Arena tram stop (Sheffield), on the Yellow Line of the Sheffield Supertram network
