= Monks Orchard =

Coordinates: 51.3818°N 0.0541°W

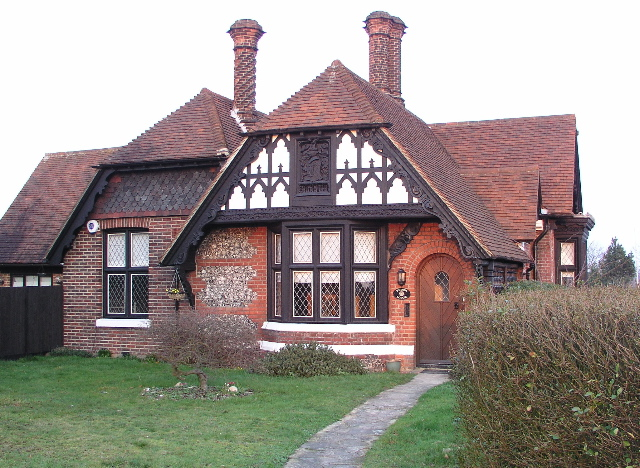
- Lodge house of Monks Orchard House

- Location within Greater London
- OS grid reference: TQ361658
- London borough: Croydon
- Ceremonial county: Greater London
- Region: London
- Country: England
- Sovereign state: United Kingdom
- Post town: CROYDON
- Postcode district: CR0
- Dialling code: 020
- Police: Metropolitan
- Fire: London
- Ambulance: London
- UK Parliament: Croydon East
- London Assembly: Croydon and Sutton

Monks Orchard is a suburb on the edge of the London Borough of Croydon, in the ceremonial county of Greater London, England, prior to 1965 it was located in the historical county of Surrey. It is situated about 10 miles (16.1 km) south south-east of Charing Cross, south of Elmers End and Eden Park, west of West Wickham, and north and east of Shirley and Shirley Oaks.

== History ==
Monks Orchard is not named after a monastery in the area, but in fact commemorates a family named Monk, from Addington, who owned a farm (Monksmead) and a wood (Monks Orchard) here in the 17th century. The land was acquired by Lewis Loyd in 1854, who built a mansion here and adopted the name of the Monks Orchard wood for the whole estate. Loyd's Monks Orchard House was one of the most substantial mansions in the Croydon area. It had 19 bedrooms, a billiard room, library, and numerous other rooms; the Dining Hall alone was over 36 ft (11 m) x 21 ft (6.4 m). The estate covered a huge area, 1,540 acres (6.2 km^{2}), stretching northwards from the Wickham Road almost to Elmers End, southwards nearly as far as Addington, and eastwards across the County boundary into West Wickham. It also included several other major residences, such as Spring Park, farms, including Eden Park, Ham Farm, Shirley Farm, Spring Park Farm and Oak Lodge Farm, two dozen or so cottages, The Rising Sun, The Cricketers and the White Hart, and Beckenham Golf Course.

As late as 1923, the area was described in the following way: "The Estate, which has an extensive frontage to the road between the villages of Shirley and West Wickham, is delightfully rural in character, typifying that which is best in the unspoiled English countryside. The land seems adapted by nature for those who are seeking country houses not too far from London, being already park-like meadow land, well timbered, and dotted with coppices; thus affording almost unlimited scope for imagination, and taste, in laying out grounds, by utilising the natural advantages already there."

When the estate came up for sale in 1920, only parts of it found buyers, and the rest, including the part now known as Monks Orchard, was offered again in 1924, and this was finally purchased by the Corporation of London for the relocation of the Bethlem Hospital, which had long outgrown its Lambeth home. Building of the new hospital started in 1928, which involved pulling down Loyd's old mansion. The hospital development did not require all of the land and the remainders of it were sold off for housing development.

By 1937–1939, most of the current streets had been developed - Orchard Grove, Elstan Way, Greenview Avenue, and so on. A 1937 prospectus for the Tudor-style "Homes of Distinction" in Greenview Avenue extols the virtues of local building ("There are no mass production houses and no mass production methods") and after describing the houses in great detail, claim that the fitted kitchenettes are "the Housewife's Dream virtually come true".

The Lawdon Estate was developed in the late 1960s and includes Regency Walk, Sloane Walk and Kempton Walk.

In 2015 the Bethlem Museum of the Mind opened in Bethlem Royal Hospital, which covers the history of the institution and changing attitudes to mental health over the decades.

== Amenities ==
The area contains a small row of shops on Bywood Avenue, with a smaller parade on Orchard Way now reduced to just a Co-op supermarket following the closure of The Orchard pub in 2019. There is also an Anglican church, St George the Martyr, located on Elstan Way; the original church (now the church hall) was built in August 1937, with the current edifice being constructed in August 1952.

== Nearest stations ==
- Eden Park railway station
- Elmers End railway station
- Norwood Junction railway station
- West Wickham railway station
- Woodside tram stop

== Gallery ==
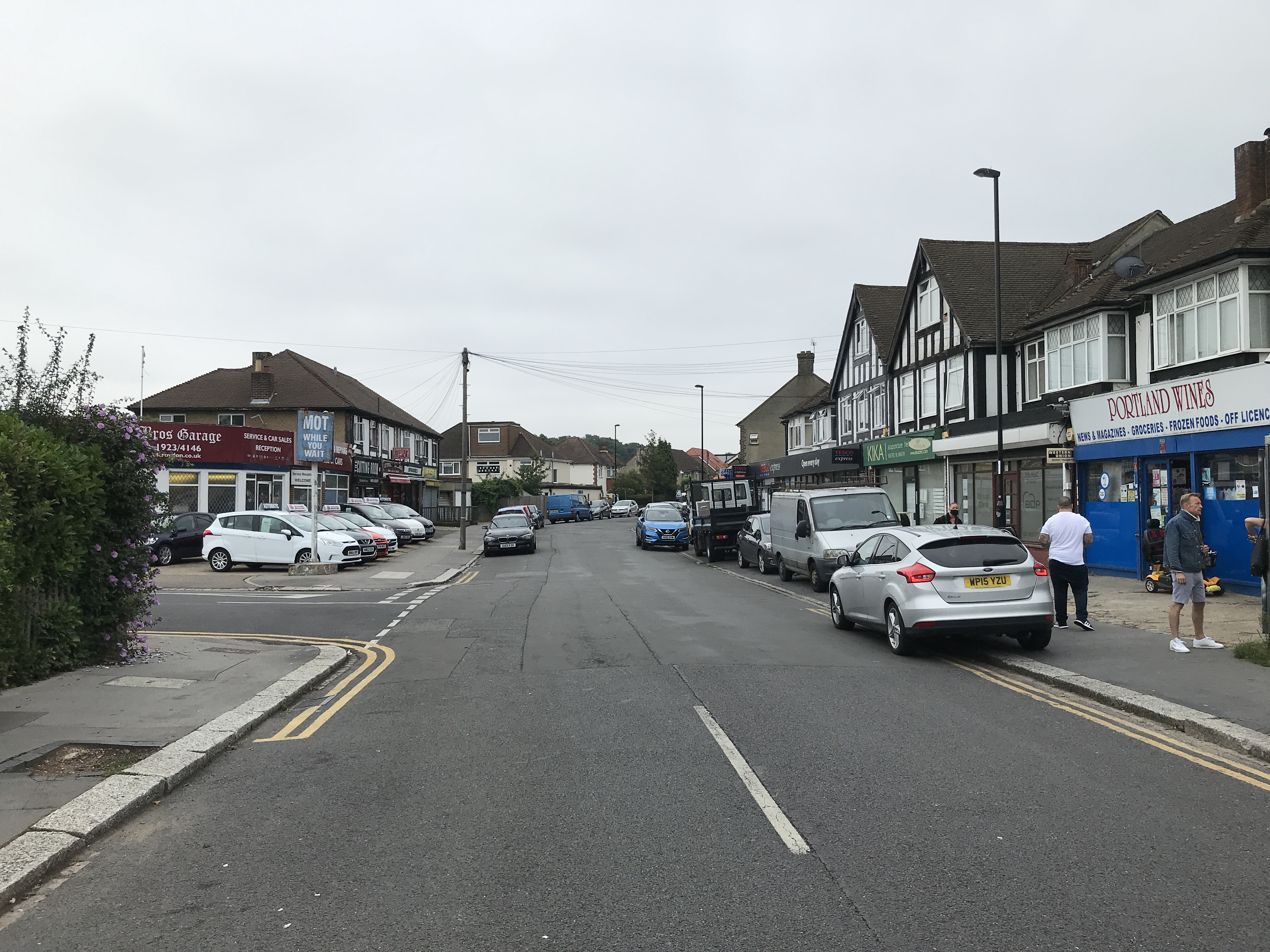
Shops on Bywood Avenue

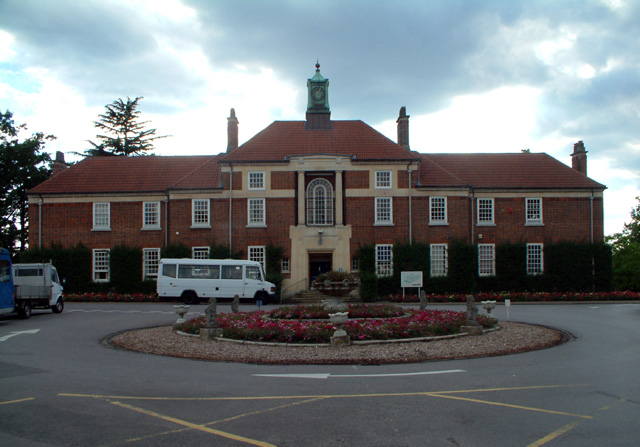
Bethlem Royal Hospital

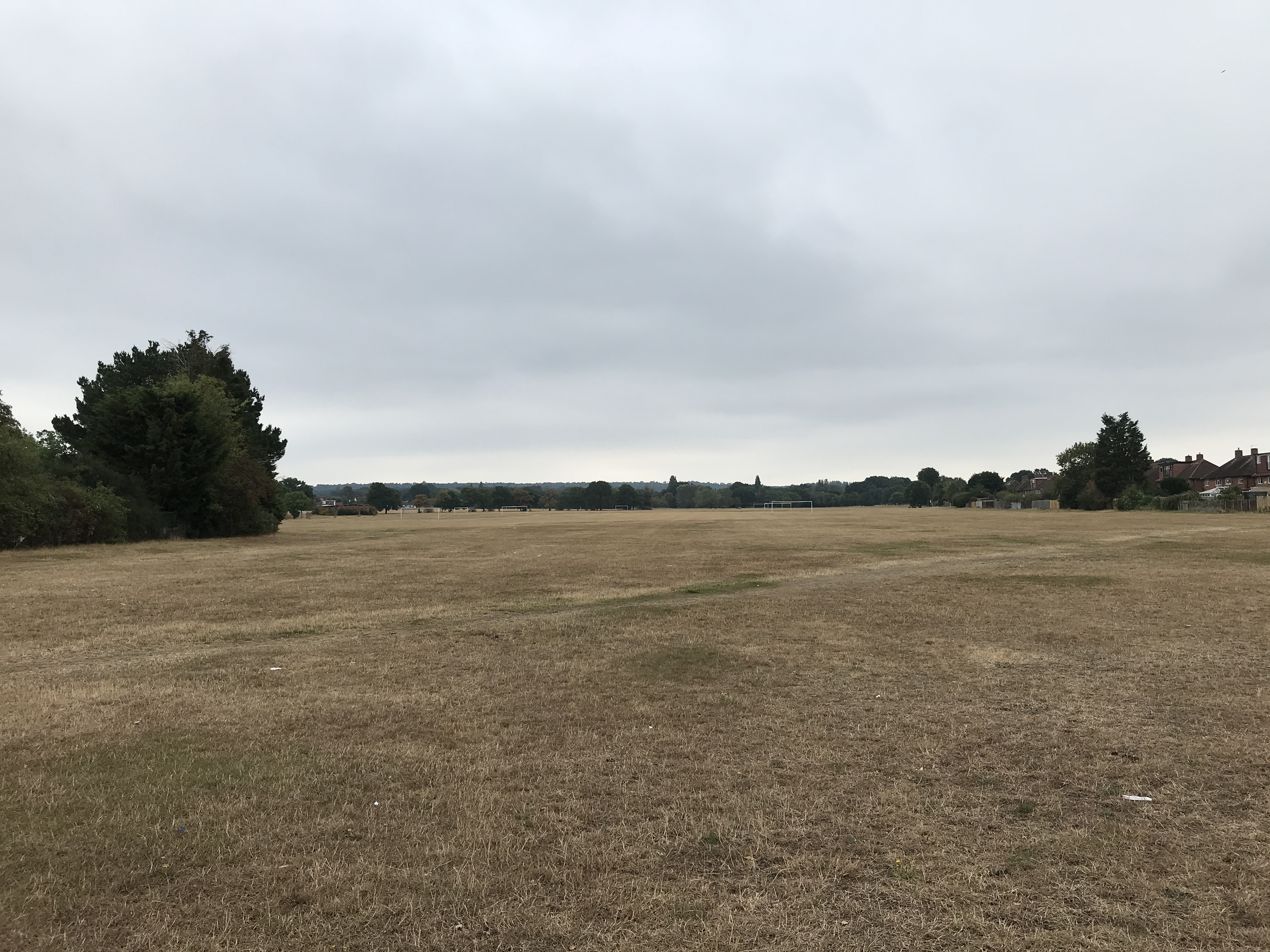
Ashburton Playing Fields, formerly Croydon Racecourse

The Co-op supermarket on Orchard Way, with the closed Orchard pub on the corner

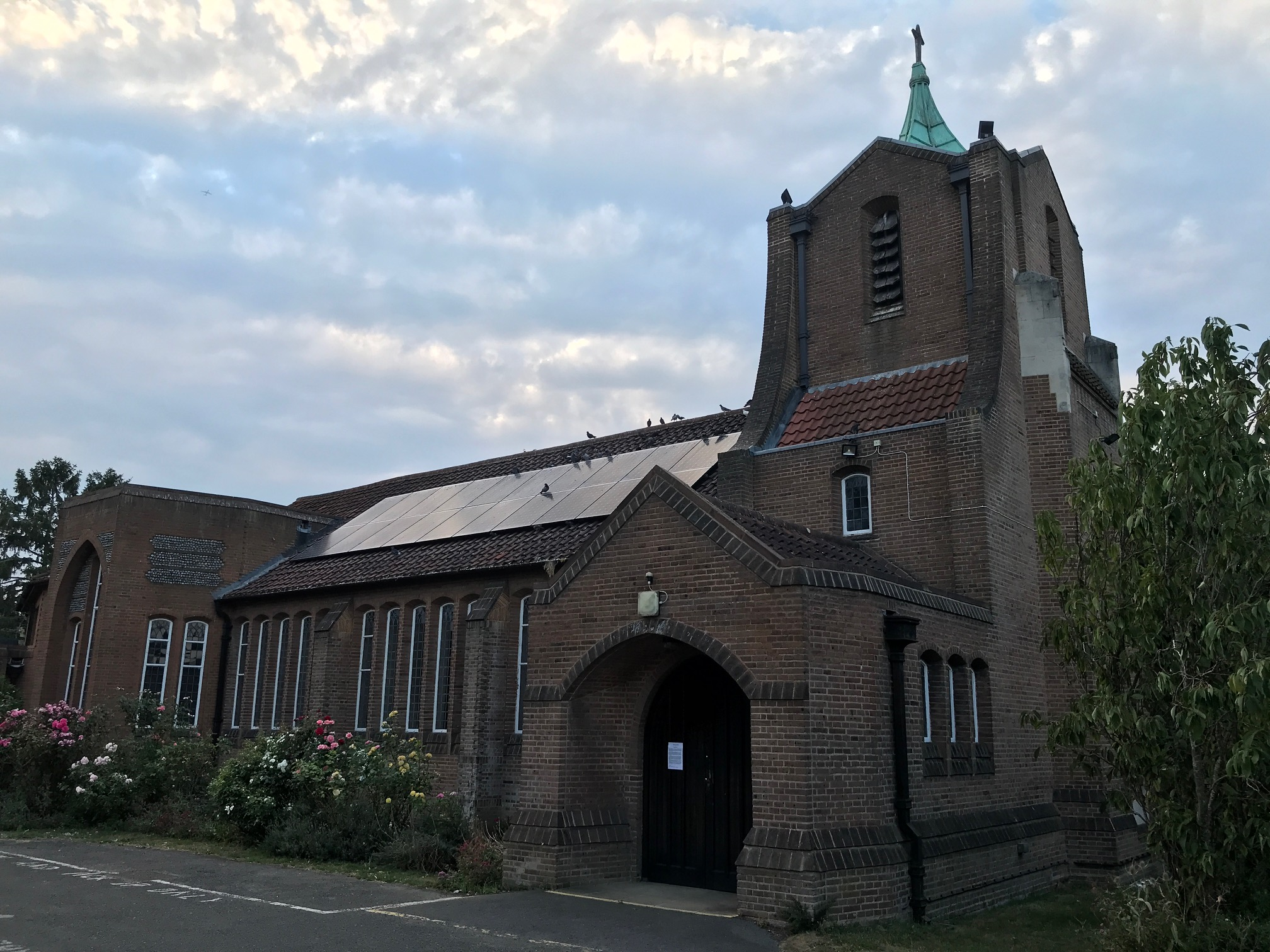
St George the Martyr Church

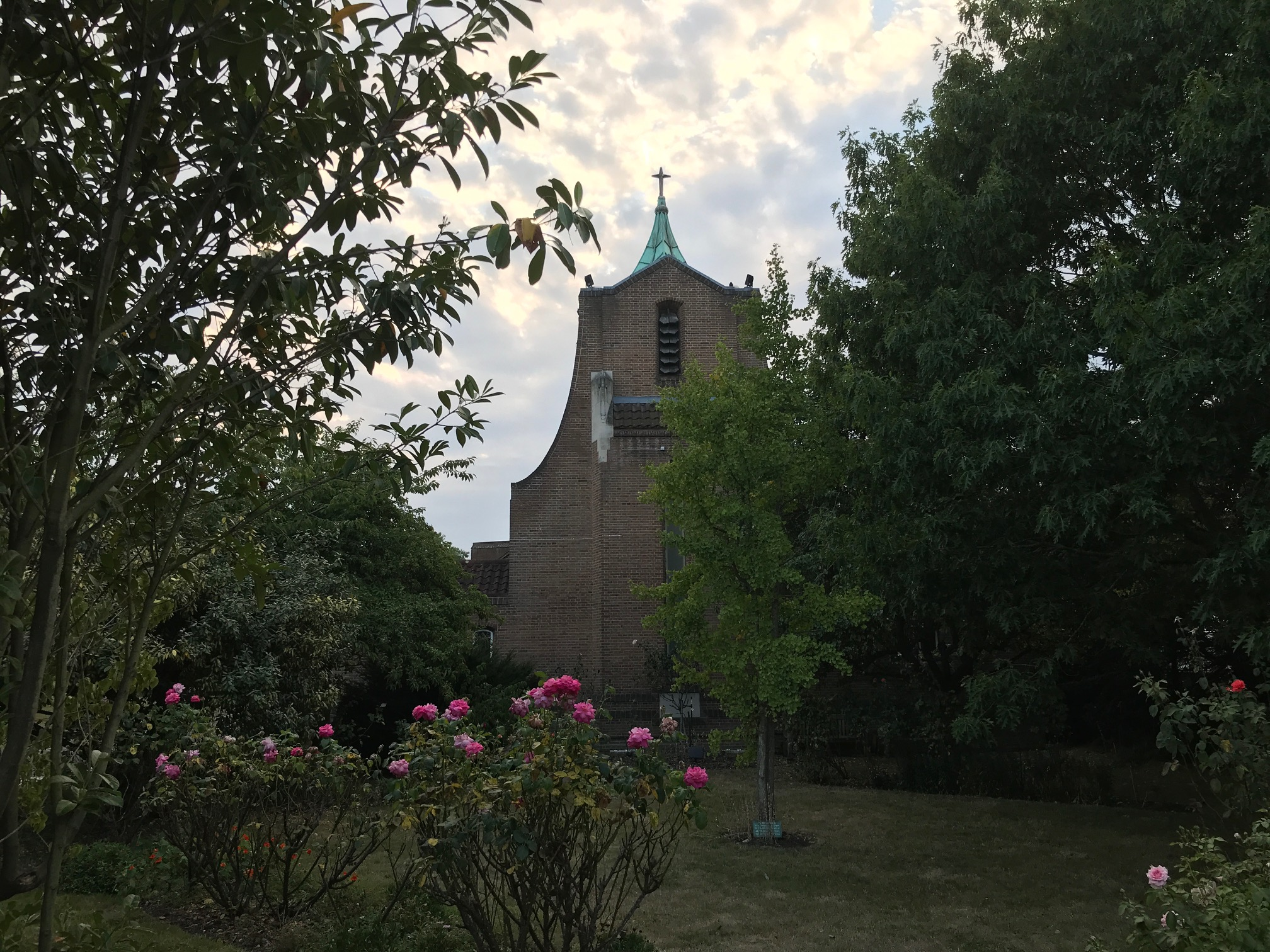
St George the Martyr Church
