= Brookmill Park =

Park in the London Borough of Lewisham, England

- Ravensbourne Park
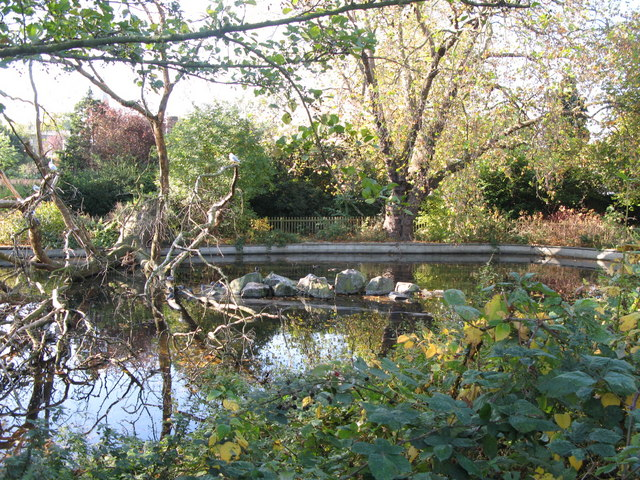
- Brookmill Park Lake photo: Mike Quinn, geograph.org.uk
- Interactive map of Brookmill Park
- Type: public park
- Location: London, England
- Coordinates: 51°28′13″N 0°01′13″W
- Area: 1.92 hectares (5 acres), (3.6 hectares (9 acres) including River Ravensbourne)
- Created: 1880 with additions in 1920s, '50s and '90s.
- Operator: London Borough of Lewisham
- Open: 8am-sunset
- Status: Open year round
- Website: brookmillpark.com

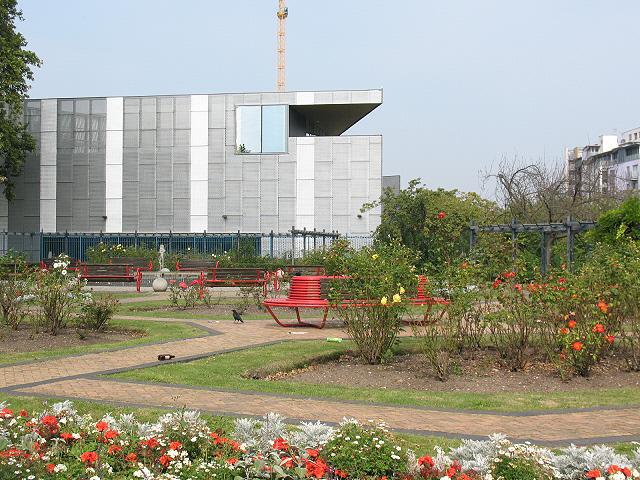
Brookmill Park rose garden and view to Stephen Lawrence Centre in Brookmill Road photo: Stephen Craven, geograph.org.uk

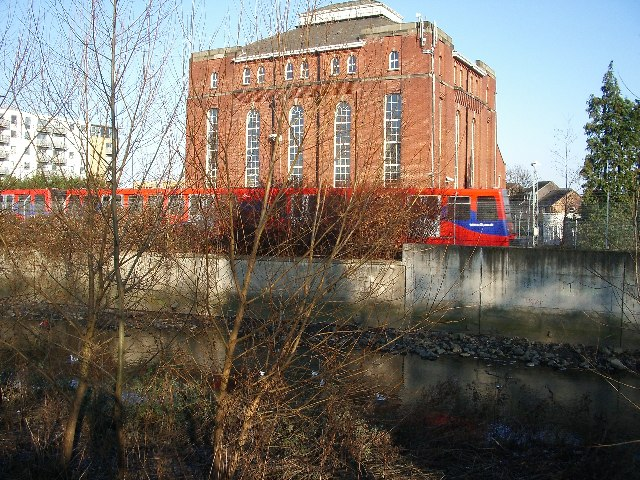
View of Ravensbourne and DLR from the park photo: John Davies, geograph.org.uk

Brookmill Park, formerly known as Ravensbourne Park, is a small public park and nature reserve located in Deptford and is in the London Borough of Lewisham. It runs parallel to Brookmill Road and the River Ravensbourne. It is located between Deptford Bridge and Elverson Road on the Docklands Light Railway (DLR).

== History of the park ==
The park began life in 1880 as a small recreation ground near the Kent Waterworks' reservoir, which supplied water to homes in Deptford and Greenwich, drawing water from the Ravensbourne. In the 1920s, part of the by then disused reservoir was infilled and added to the area, creating Brookmill Park.

Nearby housing in Brookmill Road was destroyed during World War II and cleared ground was used to enlarge the park, which re-opened in 1951 as Ravensbourne Park. In 1965, Lewisham and Deptford were amalgamated into one London borough and the park reverted to its earlier name of Brookmill.

During DLR extension to Lewisham in the 1990s, the River Ravensbourne was rerouted. Most of the park to the east of the river was used for the DLR track and the Ravensbourne's new channel became the eastern boundary of the park. The park was re-landscaped by W.S. Atkins, also incorporating a site that had belonged to Thames Water as a formal garden with ponds, pergolas and flowerbeds. The park reopened in 1998.

== Layout and notable features ==
The park runs parallel to the River Ravensbourne along its eastern side and Brookmill Road on the western side. It covers an area of 1.92 hectares (5 acres), or 3.6 hectares (9 acres) if the River Ravensbourne is included.

Part of the former reservoir remains as a small lake within the park – this had been drained but was reinstated after a local campaign.

The footpath and cycle path in the park are part of the Waterlink Way, which runs through Lewisham and Bromley. They also form part of National Cycle Route 21, which extends from the River Thames at Creekside to Eastbourne.

== Biodiversity ==
The lake is surrounded by mature trees, including London planes. The south of the park contains an area of native plants on disused railway embankment.

With areas of marsh, water and grassland, some of which floods at high tides, the park is considered an important nature conservation area within the borough of Lewisham. Bird species sighted at the park include kingfisher, grey heron, moorhen, little egret, goldcrest and grey wagtails.

Species found in the river Ravensbourne include stone loach, miller's thumb and invertebrates including gammarus, caddisfly and olives.

== External sources ==
- Description and maps showing location of former Kent Waterworks
- Deptford Dame blog on Brookmill Park wildlife
