= Heavers Meadow =

Coordinates: 51.3915°N 0.0830°W

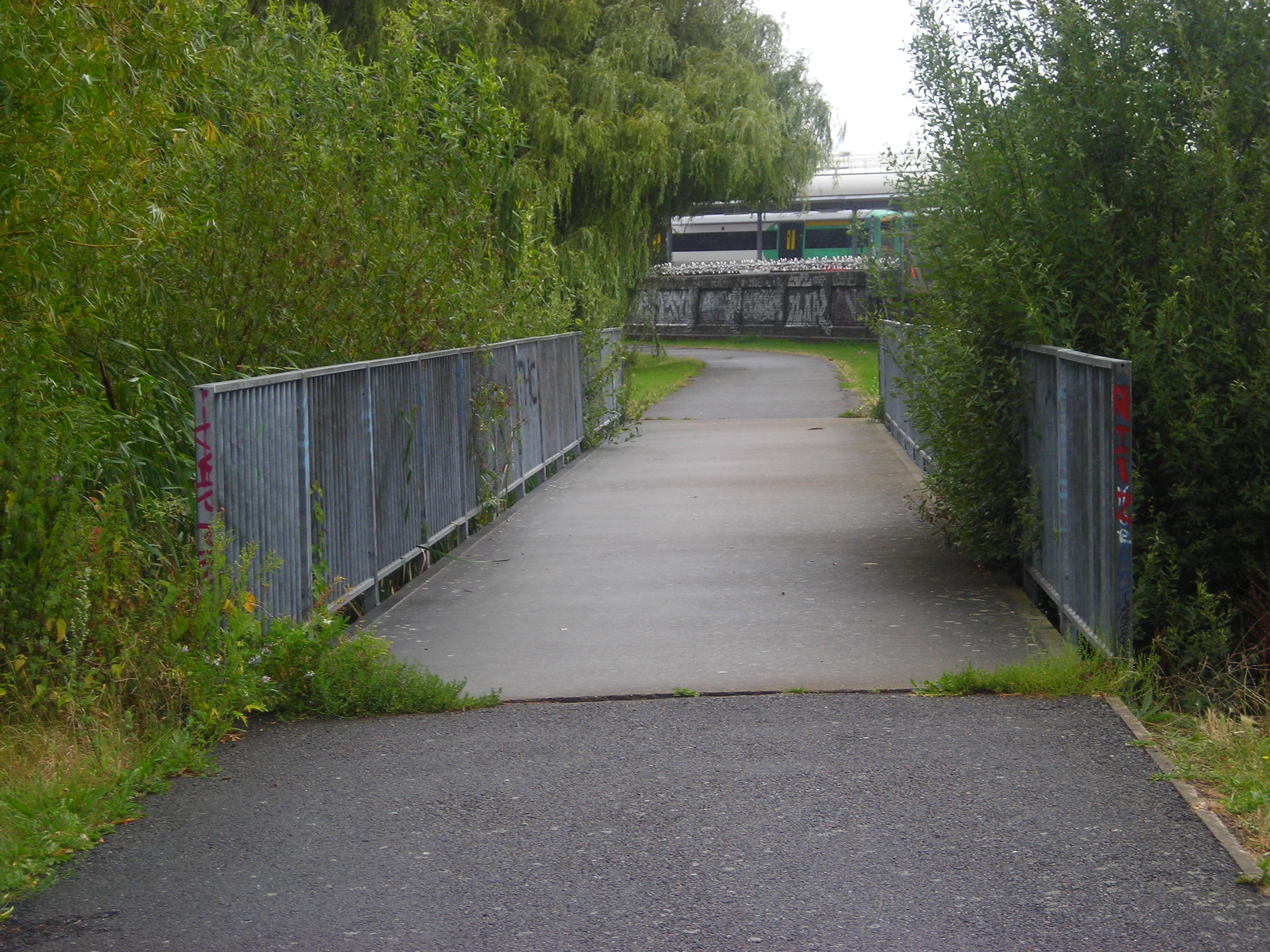
A bridge inside Heavers Meadow

Heavers Meadow is a meadow located in Selhurst in the London Borough of Croydon. South Norwood Recreation Ground is on the other side of the road. The meadow covers an area of 8 3/4 acres (3.34 hectares). With meadows there are not usually many facilities. Heavers is no exception; the only facility stated on the council's website is a footpath through a flood meadow.

However the meadow is good for commuters from Tennison Road and the surrounding area who are going to Victoria as Selhurst railway station is on the other side of the meadow. There is no gate on the Tennison Road side so it is never closed at night. The path through the meadow is very popular with cyclists.

== History ==
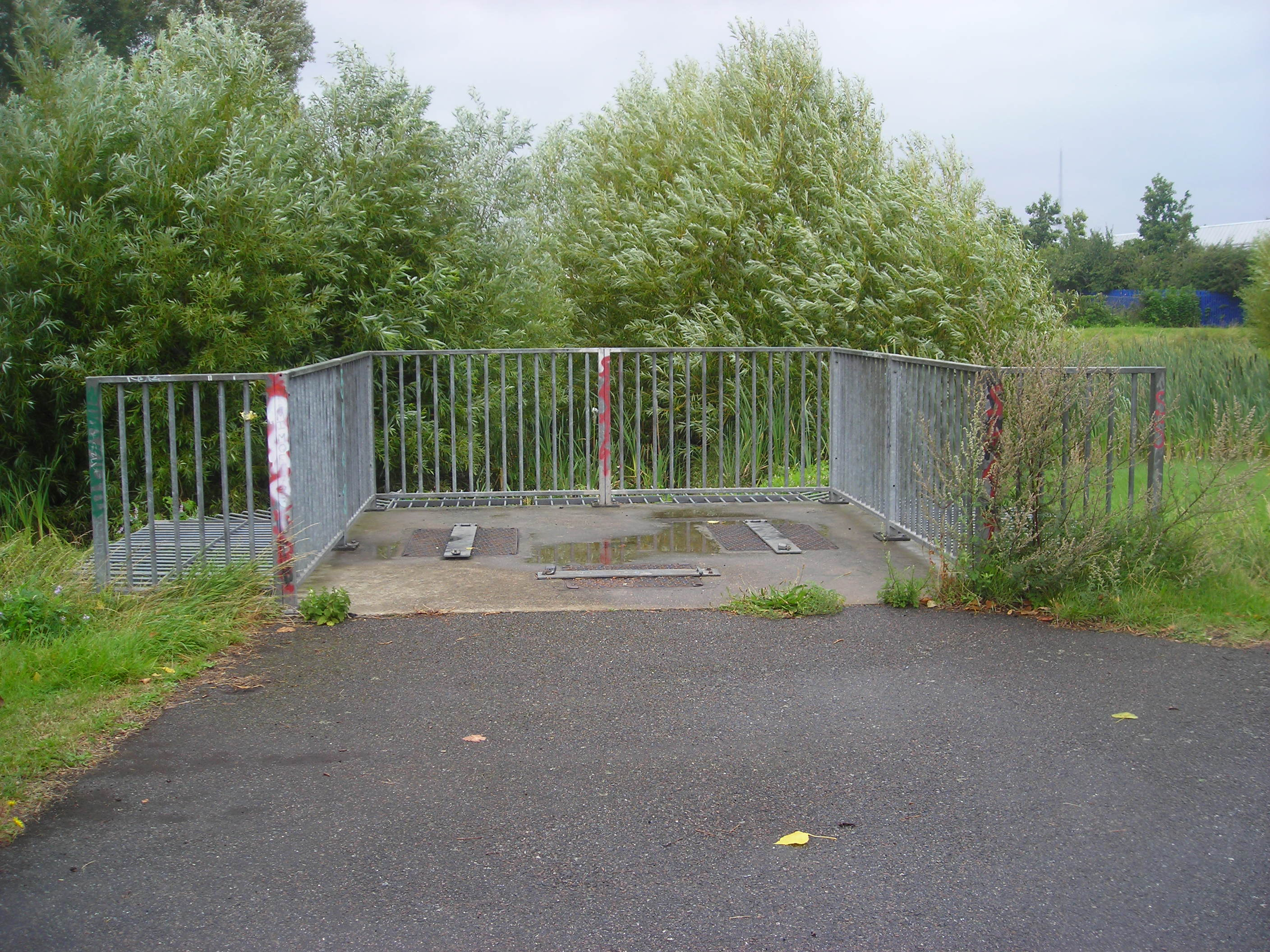
The Meadow near Tennison Road

In 1935, the area of Heavers Meadow and the adjacent allotments was passed to Croydon Corporation by the Ecclesiastical Commissioners to be used as an open space or recreation ground and allotments.

Before 1900, the western side of the site was wooded and known as Dragnet Wood in 1800 and Selhurst Wood in 1867, by which time it had been split into two parts by railway development.

Norbury Brook runs north west along the south-side of the meadow before being 'culverted' under Selhurst Road. The Brook can be seen later in Thornton Heath Recreation Ground and at the rear of houses in between.

The brook is fenced off for safety reasons; after rainfall, water levels can rise considerably in a very short time as the water drains from surrounding areas.

== See also ==
- List of Parks and Open Spaces in Croydon
- South Norwood Recreation Ground
- Croydon Council
- Woodside Green
- Brickfields Meadow
- SE25
- Selhurst
