= South Norwood Library =

Public library in Croydon, south London

Coordinates: 51.3974°N 0.0787°W

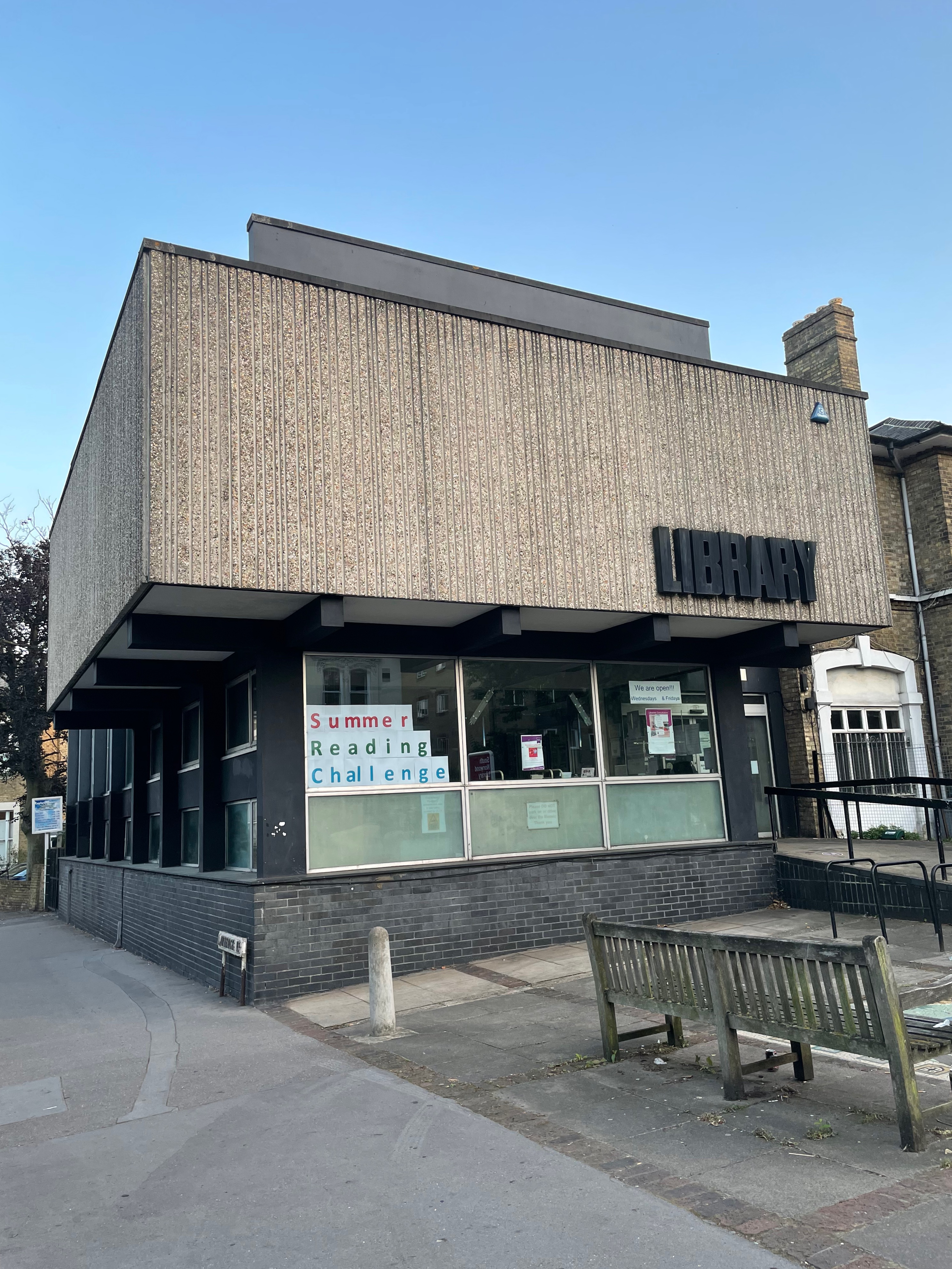
- South Norwood Library
- Location: South Norwood, London
- Type: public library
- Established: 1968
- Architect(s): Hugh Lea, Dip. Arch. (Leeds) A.R.I.B.A.
- Branch of: Croydon Libraries

Collection
- Size: 12,967

Access and use
- Access requirements: None

Other information
- Website: www.croydon.gov.uk/libraries-leisure-and-culture/libraries/find-your-library/south-norwood-library

South Norwood Library is a purpose-built public library in South Norwood, South London. Also known locally as 'Brutalist Library' it stands in the London Borough of Croydon and is part of the Croydon Libraries arm of the council. The site on the corner of Selhurst Road and Lawrence Road first had a library built in 1897, which was replaced by the current building in 1966.

Following a risk of moving the library and demolition of the building in 2019, the library service remains in the purpose-built 1968 library with reduced opening hours and a promise of renovation. The Friends of South Norwood Library campaign for the library service, supported by authors including Alex Wheatle. The Brutalist Library Campaign also worked alongside this campaign, intending to protect the building due to its architectural, historical and social merit.

== History ==
The library was designed by Hugh Lea, Borough Architect for Croydon Council in 1966 together with the Chief Librarian T.E. Callander and opened in 1968. It is locally listed, within the South Norwood conservation area and a national listing application has been made to Historic England.

The community takes great pride in this central landmark of South Norwood, and in 2006 the participatory arts organisation 'Mosaic Art' worked with hundreds of children and community members in the borough to create a Mosaic design which would form a permanent art installation in front of the library. Passers-by can enjoy the mosaic heritage treasure map which contains many clues about the history of the area.

In the year April 2012 to March 2013 the library saw 52,916 visitors, this rose to 74,455 April 2016 to March 2017.

Between 2019 and 2022 the library building was under threat of being demolished as a new purpose built building was developed at the Pump House on nearby Station Road to move into, but in 2022 it was announced that the library would stay at the Brutalist Library on Lawrence Road and be refurbished. This was met with celebration from campaigners.

A 2024 Croydon Libraries consultation proposes to reduce the library service from a statutory dedicated library in its building to a combined Community Hub (with co-located local services and businesses) along with the neighbouring Samuel Coleridge Taylor Centre.

== Architecture ==
The library is a fine example of 1960s Brutalist architecture and shows the influences of Ludwig Mies van der Rohe in its structural clarity and simplicity.

The frontage features bold black steel letters reading "LIBRARY" in Grotesk font typography on a concrete cuboid above a glass lower part of the building.

The library building is arranged over five open-plan levels, split across the front and rear of the building. The front part of the building has the ground floor entrance level, which houses the reception, and the second floor which houses the children's library (formerly a general reading room). The rear of the building has the basement, first and third floors. The levels are offset so that the floors in the front and rear of the building appear like mezzanine levels to each other. There is a lift serving all five floors.

South Norwood Library has been part of Open House London in 2021, which was organised by the Brutalist Library Campaign, and was featured in the must-see buildings of Open House London alongside 10 Downing Street and City Hall, London (Southwark).

Edwin Heathcote, the Financial Times's architecture critic picked South Norwood Library as one of six places to see during the Open House London Festival 2021. The Architects' Journal also included South Norwood Library as one of their highlights of Open House London 2021. In 2023 the library was shortlisted for an Architecture Today Award in the Cultural and Religious Buildings Category.

The building style has had praise from architecture experts, such as Bridget Cherry, who enjoyed its opening saying it had "quite an impact in the street", art writer Javier Pes called it "the rough diamond of Norwood" whilst Brutalist historian Dr Barnabas Calder described the building as neighbourly and respectful.

== Services ==
Services available at South Norwood Library include Books & CDs for reference and loan at the reception area. There is a children's library on the second floor.

Other services include:

- Enquiry service
- Free access to PCs including the internet
- Black and white photocopier
- Books in community languages
- Newspapers and periodicals
- Community information
- Reading groups
- 8 study spaces

The need for computer use is particularly high at South Norwood Library, with only the central library in Croydon busier in the borough.

The library has had special one-off events over the years such as author visits from Jamie Rix (in June 2001) and Jeremy Strong (in November 2001).

As of January 2025 the library is open three days a week.

== See also ==
- Tabener House
- South Norwood Recreation Ground
- South Norwood Leisure Centre
- Norwood Junction railway station
