= Arena tram stop (Croydon) =

Tramlink tram stop in London, England

Arena
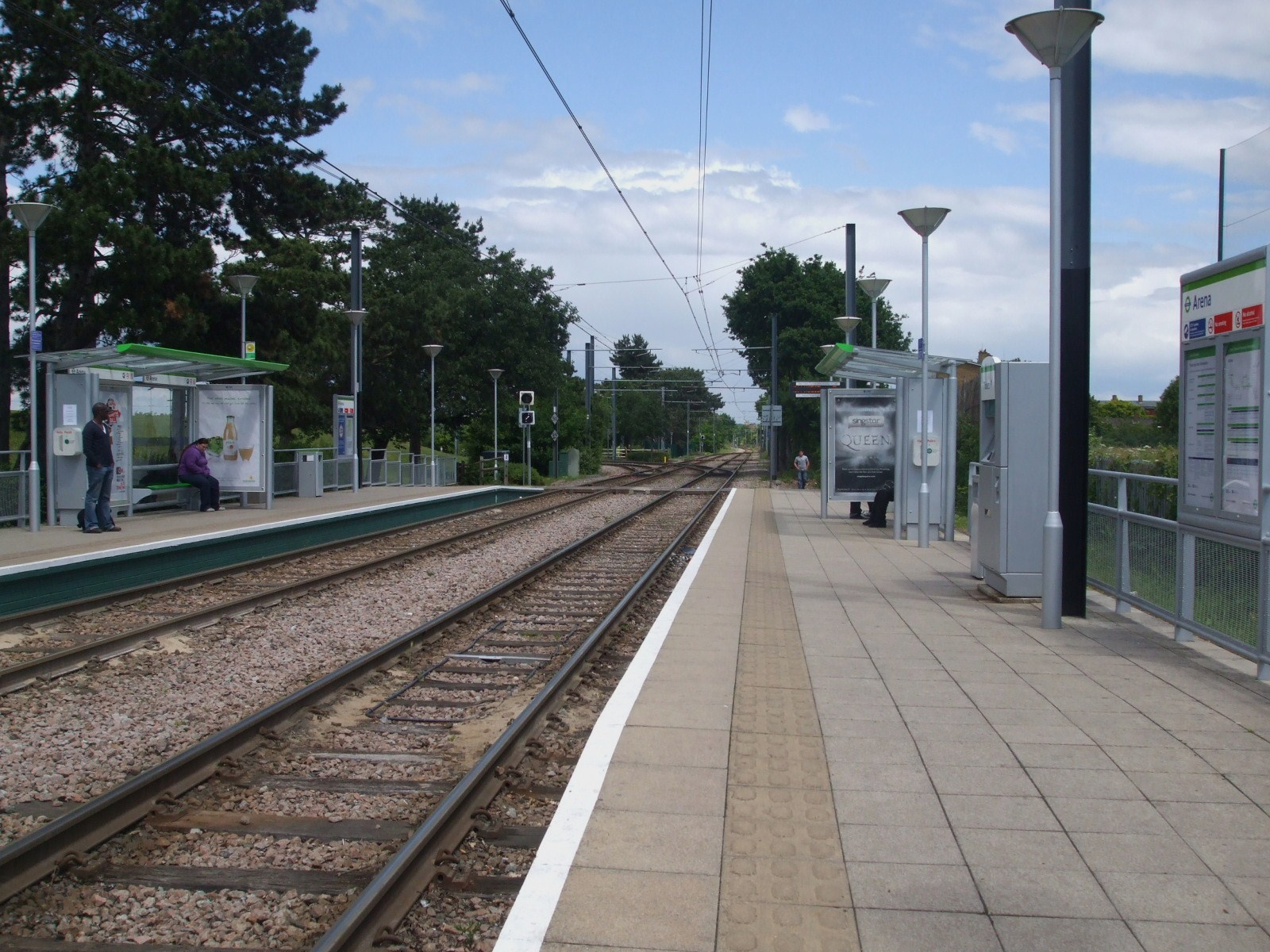
- Looking north, with the junction visible ahead

General information
- Location: Woodside, Croydon
- Coordinates: 51.391564°N 0.058324°W
- Operated by: Tramlink
- Platforms: 2

Construction
- Structure type: At-grade
- Accessible: Yes

Other information
- Status: Unstaffed
- Website: Official website

History
- Opened: 23 May 2000
Location
- Location in Croydon

Arena tram stop is a light rail stop in the Woodside area of South Norwood in the London Borough of Croydon in the southern suburbs of London. The stop is located by the Croydon Sports Arena and serves the council estates of Longheath Gardens Estate and Tollgate Estate.

The tram stop is located on a section of line which follows the trackbed of the former Woodside and South Croydon Railway, although there was no station at the location prior to the opening of Tramlink. The stop is at ground level on double track, with platforms on each side of the tracks. Immediately to the east of the station is a junction where services diverge either to the north along a section of route specially constructed for Tramlink, or continue straight ahead along the former railway right of way. Just beyond this junction services bound for Elmers End becomes a single track for the rest of its journey.

The National Cycle Route 21 (the Waterlink Way) crosses the tram lines at Arena.

== Services ==
The typical off-peak service in trams per hour from Arena is:

- 6 tph in each direction between Beckenham Junction and Wimbledon
- 6 tph in each direction between Elmers End and Wimbledon

Services are operated using Bombardier CR4000 and Stadler Variobahn model low-floor trams.

Preceding station	Tramlink	Following station
Woodside towards Wimbledon	Tramlink; Wimbledon to Beckenham Junction	Harrington Road towards Beckenham Junction
Woodside towards Wimbledon	Tramlink; Wimbledon to Elmers End	Elmers End Terminus

== Connections ==
London Buses route 289 serves the tram stop.

Free interchange for journeys made within an hour is available between trams and buses as part of Transport for London's Hopper Fare.

== See also ==
- Woodside and South Croydon Railway
