= Blackhorse Lane tram stop =

Tramlink tram stop in London, England

Blackhorse Lane
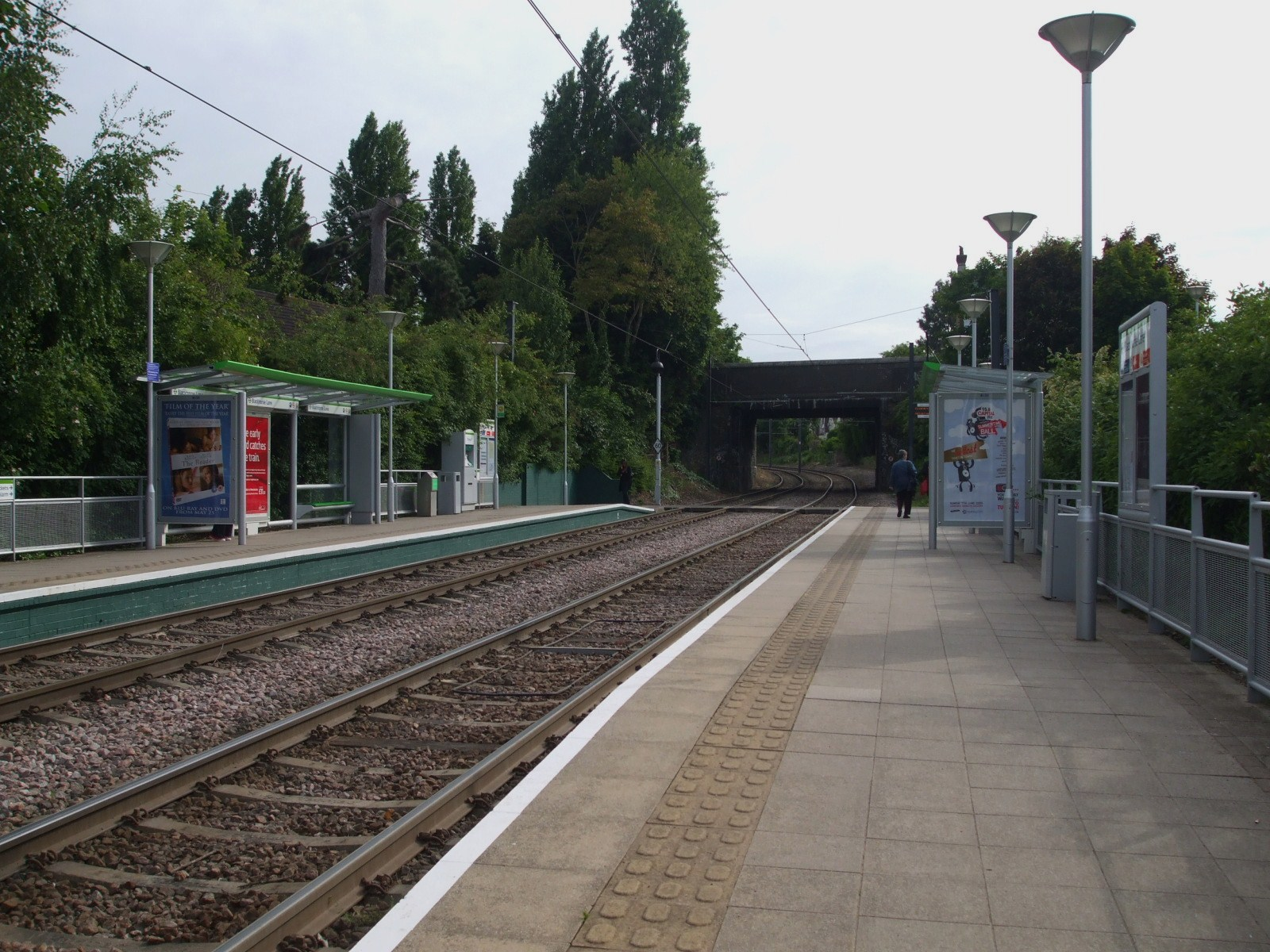
- Looking south

General information
- Location: Blackhorse Lane, Croydon
- Coordinates: 51.384927°N 0.070329°W
- Operated by: Tramlink
- Platforms: 2

Construction
- Structure type: Below-grade
- Accessible: Yes

Other information
- Status: Unstaffed
- Website: Official website

History
- Opened: 23 May 2000
Location
- Location in Croydon

Blackhorse Lane tram stop is a light rail stop in the London Borough of Croydon in the southern suburbs of London.

The tram stop is located on a section of line which follows the trackbed of the former Woodside and South Croydon Railway, and is adjacent to the point at which that railway's branch to Addiscombe station diverged from the line between Elmers End station and Sanderstead station. Prior to the opening of Tramlink, there was no station at this site which had previously contained long-disused allotments.

== Services ==
The typical off-peak service in trams per hour from Blackhorse Lane is:

- 6 tph in each direction between Beckenham Junction and Wimbledon
- 6 tph in each direction between Elmers End and Wimbledon

Services are operated using Bombardier CR4000 and Stadler Variobahn model low-floor trams.

Preceding station	Tramlink	Following station
Addiscombe towards Wimbledon	Tramlink; Wimbledon to Beckenham Junction	Woodside towards Beckenham Junction
Addiscombe towards Wimbledon	Tramlink; Wimbledon to Elmers End	Woodside towards Elmers End

== Connections ==
London Buses route 197 serves the tram stop.

Free interchange for journeys made within an hour is available between trams and buses as part of Transport for London's Hopper Fare.
