= South Norwood Recreation Ground =

Park in the London Borough of Croydon, England

Coordinates: 51.395°N 0.078°W

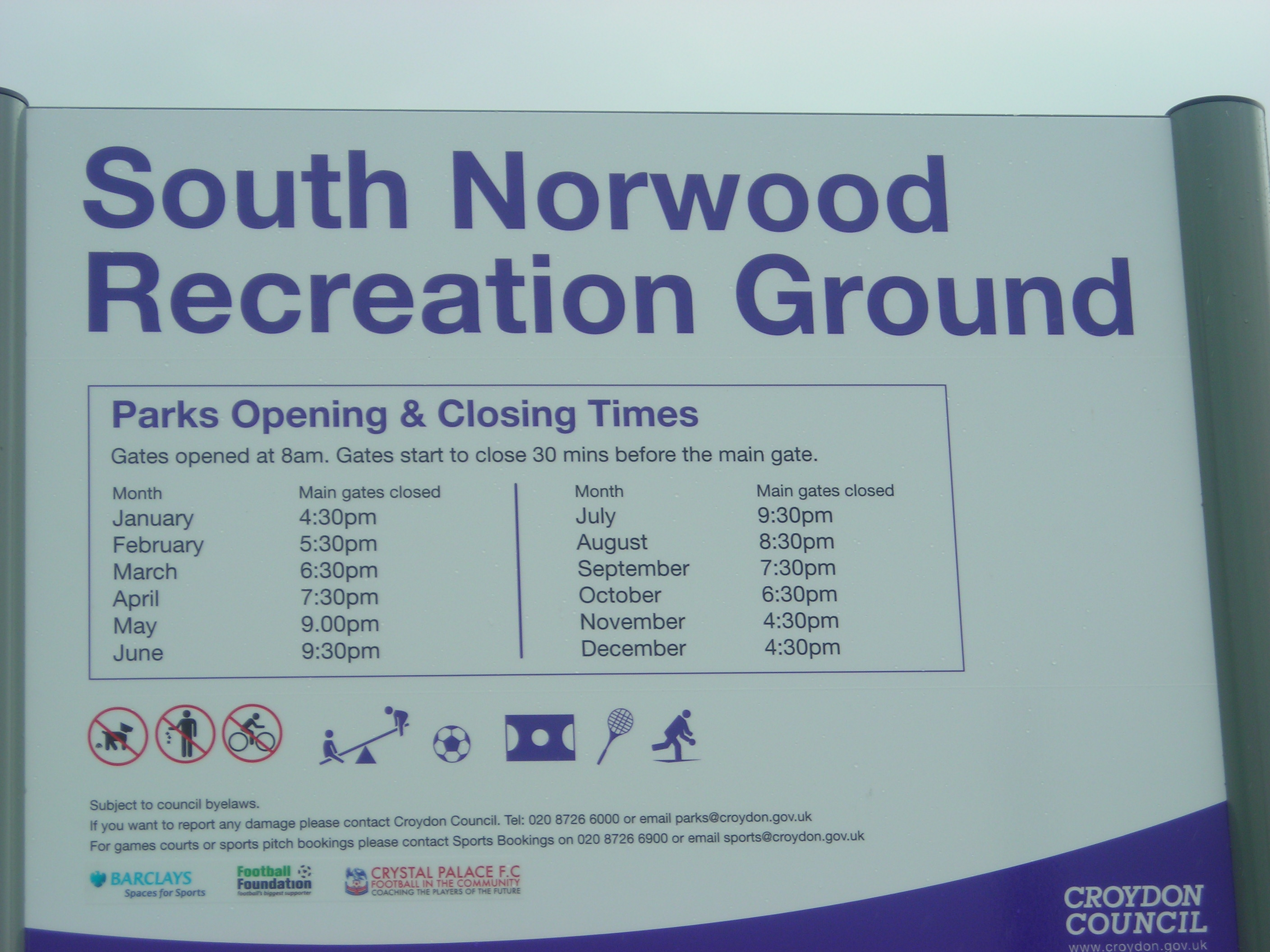
- The new Park sign at South Norwood Recreation Ground
- Interactive map of South Norwood Recreation Ground
- Type: Public park
- Location: South Norwood
- Operator: London Borough of Croydon
- Status: Open all year

South Norwood Recreation Ground is a park located in South Norwood in the London Borough of Croydon. In 1889, Croydon Corporation acquired the land and the borough surveyor estimated that it would cost just over £1,300 to lay out. Over a quarter of the projected cost was to install land drainage, which indicates that the site was quite wet. The recreation ground includes a sports area, football pitches, tennis court, floodlit courts, bowling green with pavilion and a playground.

The park has an area of 14 acres (57,000 m^{2}) and 5.67 hectares.

== See also ==
- List of parks and open spaces in the London Borough of Croydon
- South Norwood Library
- Brickfields Meadow
- Heavers Meadow
- South Norwood Country Park
- South Norwood Lake and Grounds
