= Ashburton Learning Village =

Educational complex in London, England

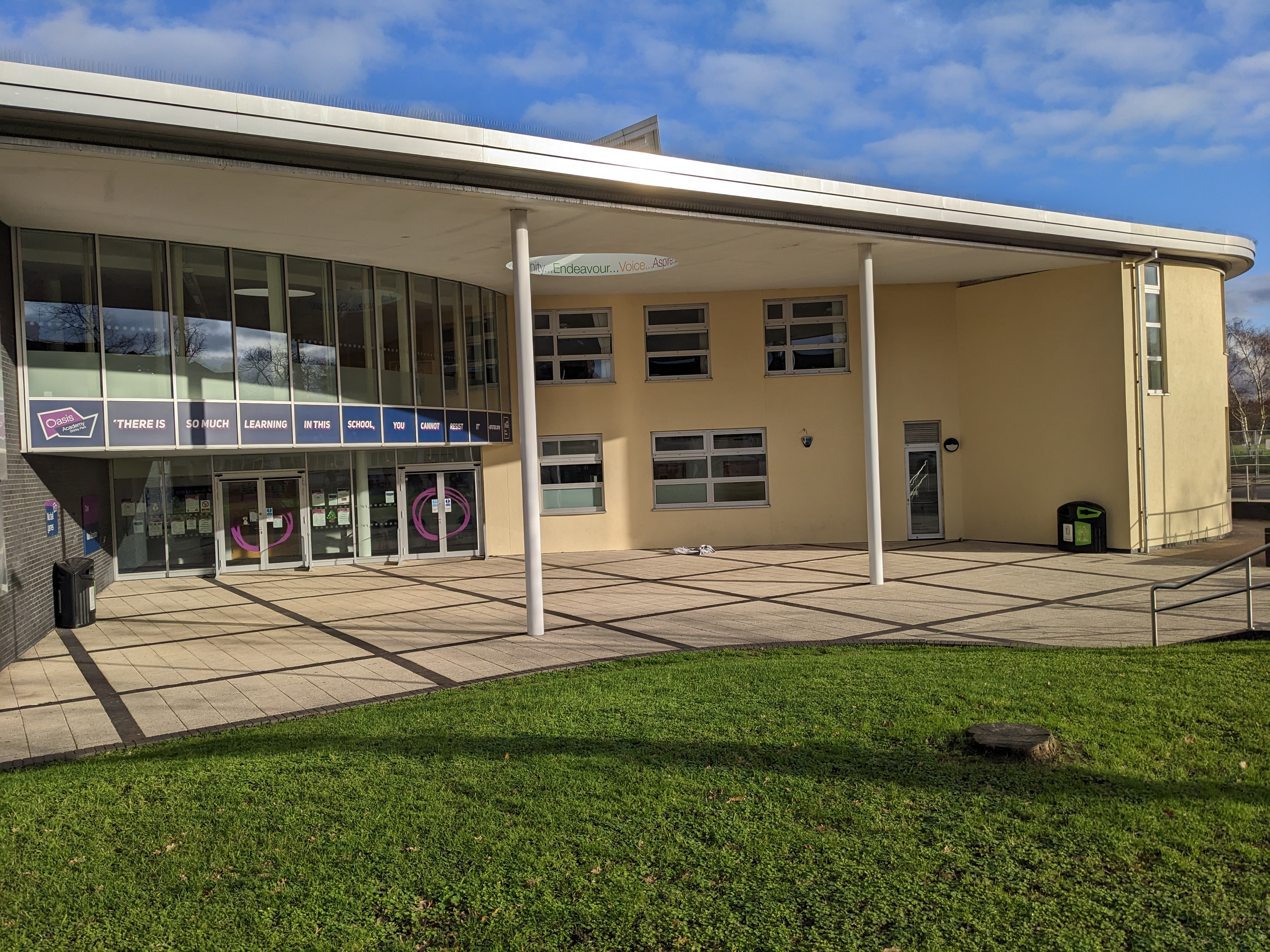
- Interactive map of the Ashburton Learning Village area

General information
- Location: Woodside, Croydon, Greater London, United Kingdom
- Coordinates: 51.3829425°N 0.06291°W
- Construction started: June 2004
- Completed: 2006
- Cost: £18.4 Million
- Client: Norwest Holst / Croydon Council

Design and construction
- Architect: Penoyre & Prasad / Noam Raz

Ashburton Learning Village is a learning complex in Woodside, Greater London. It stands in the London Borough of Croydon, and is located near Ashburton Park. The village includes Ashburton Library, Oasis Academy Shirley Park, Croydon Music Service and a CALAT training centre. The complex was built after the old Ashburton Library was closed down.

The £20 million secondary school, library and community facilities is the borough's first education Private Finance Initiative (PFI) development.

Former energy minister Malcolm Wicks praised the new development in Croydon, for its ‘innovative design’ and ‘energy-efficient features’.

The then MP for Croydon North said:

The learning village will become a true beacon of excellence in our community. Apart from its huge potential in terms of education, it is significant that the building has taken sustainable energy seriously. It points to a better future, not only for education but also for clean energy.

== Special features ==
- Solar panels to generate electricity for the building
- A rain water tank to feed toilets and service sinks
- Movement-sensitive automatic lights
- Sun tubes for rooms without windows in the form of polished chrome cylinders that are fitted in the ceiling and protrude from the roof and, with the help of micro prism glass, magnify the light coming into the room and thus reduce the need for electric lights
- Floor-to-ceiling windows and sky lights in the library, which again reduce the need for electric lights
- A brise soleil – a permanent blind that stops glare from the sun but allows maximum daylight into rooms – installed on the outside of the library windows
- Air-pressure tests to ensure the buildings heat insulation reaches the required standard
- School computer equipment locked into desks and only activated by a main key, reducing the possibility of theft and damage, while allowing full use to users.

As well as Croydon Music Service and CETS having access to these amenities, the entire community will benefit as they are available for use after school hours, at weekends and during school holidays. In particular, members of the public can use the gym areas and changing rooms daily.

School safety was also high on the design brief and all areas have been made secure with the use of card keys. Everyone entering the building must do so through the main reception. Locked areas are automatically deactivated if the fire alarm should go off.

In March, the former Secretary of State for Education Ruth Kelly MP visited the learning village, and marked the end of the construction period with a foundation stone taken from the original school, which opened in 1950.

She said

¨I was very impressed with what I saw. It is a flagship development which benefits both the pupils and the community¨

Work on Ashburton Learning Village, Shirley Road, Croydon, started in June 2004 but plans to redevelop the school had been in the pipeline since 2001, when Croydon Council gained government funding from the then Department for Education and Employment through the Private Finance Initiative (PFI).

Additional PFI credits were granted by the Department for Culture, Media and Sport and the Department of Trade and Industry, enabling Ashburton Library to move from its current home in Ashburton Park and allowing the more ambitious plans to create a learning village for the whole community to be developed.

DCMS gave Croydon Council £24 million towards the project.

As part of the project, 100 new homes will be built on the surplus land.

Ashburton Community School was replaced by Oasis Academy: Shirley Park in 2009.

== Oasis Academy Shirley Park ==
Oasis Academy Shirley Park (formerly Ashburton Community School) is an academic school located in the centre of the learning village.

=== Notable alumni ===
- Alex Wynter, footballer with Crystal Palace, attended 2005–2010.
- Louis John, footballer with Crystal Palace, attended 2005–2010.
- Harry Osborne, footballer with Crystal Palace, attended 2005–2010.
- Jerome Williams, footballer with Crystal Palace, attended 2004–2010.
- Ibra Sekajja, footballer with Barnet (on loan from Crystal Palace), attended 2004–2009.
- Sean Scannell, footballer with Huddersfield Town, attended 2002–2007.
- Damian Scannell, footballer with Eastleigh, attended 1996–2001.
- Neal Ardley, manager of Notts County and former footballer with Wimbledon F.C.
- Dean Leacock, footballer with Notts County.

== Ashburton Library ==
Ashburton Library is a public library located in the learning village. It is owned by Croydon Council and is part of the Croydon Libraries arm of the council. The library, unlike many other Croydon Libraries, is based on only one floor. The library moved in when it finished building in March, 2006.

Like all Croydon libraries it includes free access to PCs which includes the internet. Books, CDs, DVDs, videos for reference and loan.

In 2025, when other Croydon Libraries were closed Ashburton Library increased their opening hours to 5 days a week.

== See also ==
- Ashburton Park
- Woodside tram stop
