= Ashburton River =

Ashburton River may refer to:

- Ashburton River / Hakatere, New Zealand
- Ashburton River (Western Australia)
