= Brickfields Meadow =

Meadow in Croydon, London

Coordinates: 51.3902°N 0.0728°W

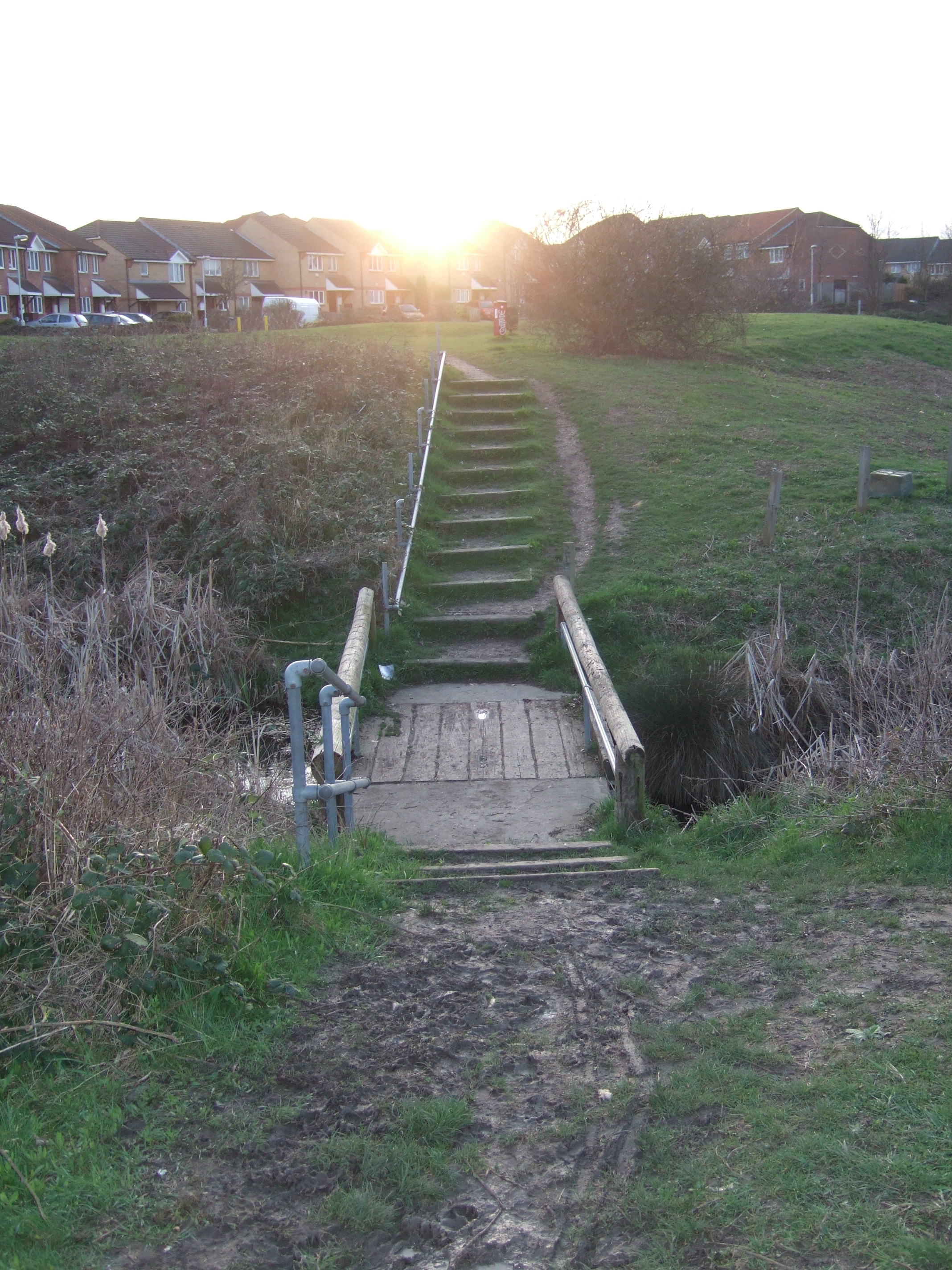
Brickfields Meadow

Brickfields Meadow is a meadow in Woodside in the London Borough of Croydon. It is located on the former site of a brickworks in Tennison Road and Dickensons Lane. The meadow covers an area of about 4.37 hectares. The meadow is not very well known to residents on Tennison Road, as the entrance is very secluded, beyond an EDF Energy transformer. The meadow includes: large pond where fishing is allowed, dipping platform, Buddleia Valley, grassland and woodland planting, small woodland area, and a children's play area which includes a mini maze and roundabout.

Brickfields Meadow is the site of the defunct Woodside brickworks which the Council was able to take control of as a planning gain in the early 1990s. The site was previously operated as a brickworks by Edward Mayhew in the early 19th century, and later by Handleys and then Hall & Co Brickworks from 1915 to 1974. The meadow is somewhat unkempt, with an amount of rubbish scattered around the deep pond, filled with cloudy brown water. A community group has been formed to try to maintain the park and raise funds.

Heavers Meadow, also located on Tennison Road, is not as big as Brickfields Meadow.

== See also ==
- List of Parks and Open Spaces in Croydon
- South Norwood Recreation Ground
- Croydon Council
- Woodside Green
