= Waterlink Way =

Walking route in London, England

Waterlink_Way
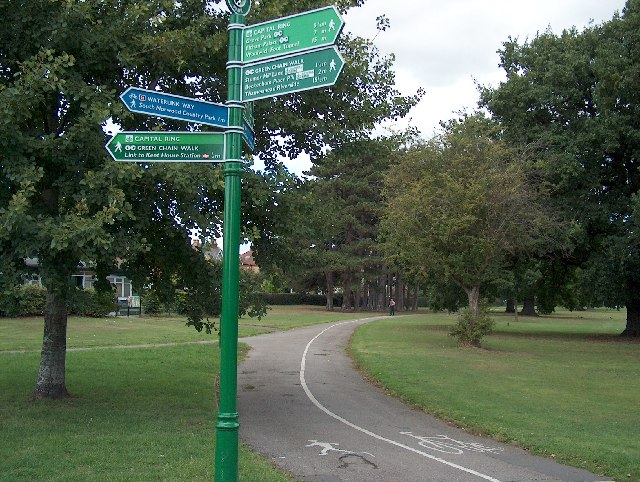
- Cyclepath junction in Cator Park, Beckenham
- Length: 8 mi (13 km)
- Location: Southern England, United Kingdom
- Designation: UK National Trail
- Trailheads: South Norwood Country Park and Cutty Sark ship, Greenwich
- Use: Hiking, cycling
- Difficulty: Easy
- Season: All year
- Waymark: Reflected "W"
- Hazards: Section of road along Ladywell Road

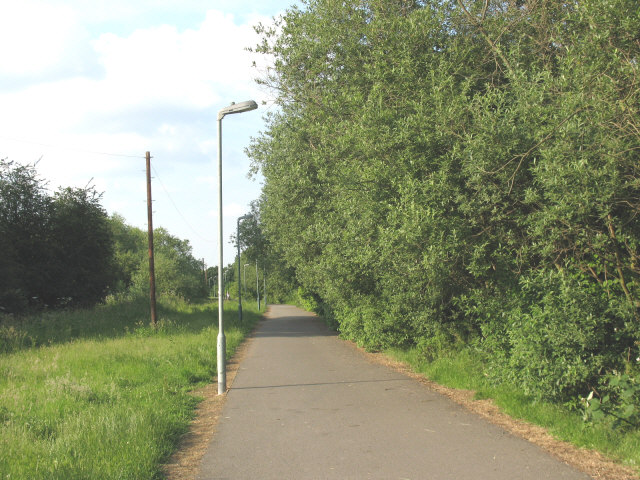
Waterlink Way cyclepath in Bellingham

Waterlink Way is a cyclepath and walking route in South East London. It extends from South Norwood Country Park (near Elmers End station) to the Cutty Sark ship in Greenwich, a total of eight miles.

The Waterlink Way connects a number of parks and green spaces in South East London – including Ladywell Fields and Brookmill Park – while following the Pool and Ravensbourne rivers. The route was designed to be accessible, with a large number of railway stations including Kent House, Lower Sydenham, Ladywell, Lewisham and Greenwich en route.

== Other routes ==
The Waterlink Way forms part of National Cycle Network (Route 21 between London and the Sussex coast).

In Cator Park, Beckenham the cyclepath links with the Capital Ring and Green Chain Walk long-distance footpaths.

== Signage ==
Waterlink Way waymark.

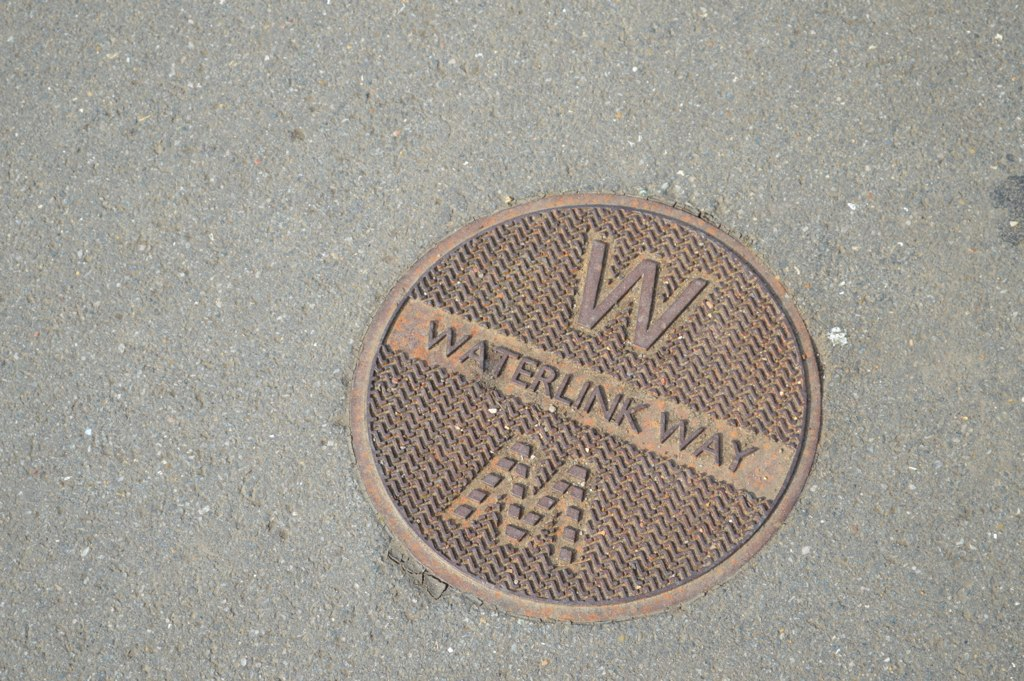
Some parts of the Waterlink Way are shown with inset pavement markers.

The Waterlink Way is shown on road signs and sometimes with pavement markers. There are further Waterlink Way signs along NCN21 beyond its official southern end point, for example at New Addington.
