= Oasis Academy Shirley Park =

Location
- Shirley Road; Croydon, Greater London, CR9 7AL; England
- Coordinates: 51°22′59″N 0°03′47″W

Information
- Type: Academy
- Trust: Oasis Community Learning
- Department for Education URN: 135968 Tables
- Ofsted: Reports
- Principal: Saqib Chaudhri (secondary & sixth form) Laura Evry (primary)
- Gender: Mixed
- Age: 4 to 19
- Enrolment: 1,682
- Website: www.oasisacademyshirleypark.org

Oasis Academy Shirley Park (formerly Ashburton Community School) is a mixed all-through school located within the Ashburton Learning Village complex in the Woodside area of Croydon, Greater London, England.

The school educates children of primary and secondary school age, and also has a sixth form. It is based on three sites: Shirley Road, Long Lane, Stroud Green. Originally two schools, Ashburton Secondary Modern Boys and Ashburton Secondary Modern Girls, which merged in 1971 to become Ashburton High School. At a later date, the school became Ashburton Community School and became an Academy in 2009 and was renamed Oasis Academy Shirley Park. The school is sponsored by the Oasis Trust.

The academy has a partnership with local English Premier League-club Crystal Palace dating back to the former Community School.

== Description ==
Oasis Academy Shirley Park is part of the Oasis Community Learning group, and evangelical Christian charity. The trust have guided forty schools out of special measures. 19 per cent of the 52 Oasis academies classified as failing. The trust's founder Reverend Steve Chalke says "Turning round a school is sometimes a quick fix, it really, truly is". Oasis Academy Shirley Park was judged an outstanding school in 2013 and again in 2018 it was a good school but with potential to speedily become outstanding again.

=== Curriculum ===
Virtually all maintained schools and academies follow the National Curriculum, and there success is judged on how well they succeed in delivering a 'broad and balanced curriculum'. Schools endeavour to get all students to achieve the English Baccalaureate (EBACC) qualification. This must include core subjects a modern or ancient foreign language, and either History or Geography.

The academy operates a three-year, Key Stage 3 where all the core National Curriculum subjects are taught. This is a transition period from primary to secondary education, that builds on the skills, knowledge and understanding gained at primary school, and introduces youngsters who are starting from a lower than average base to wider, robust and challenging programmes of study needed to gain qualifications at Key Stage 4.

At Key Stage 4 the focus is on the EBACC, and there are daily Maths, English and Science lessons. Spanish is the taught Modern Language.

=== EYFS Key Stage 1 Key Stage 2 ===
This is an all through school where the Early Years Foundation Stage (EYFS) provides stimulating environments where 3- and 4-year-olds can play, explore, experiment, develop confidence, be curiosity to learn through play. The primary section is equivalent to a Key Stage 1 and Key Stage 2, or a Primary School. Key Stage 1 is about accustomising the children to the practices of the classroom, number bonds and phonics.

The revision of 2014, made the English syllabus concentrate on formal grammar, this is all tested by Key Stage 2 SATs. This is alleged to prepare the student to subject oriented Key Stage 3, and is inspected by Ofsted, but remains controversial.
