= South Norwood Country Park =

Park in the London Borough of Croydon

Coordinates: 51°23′47″N 0°3′24″W

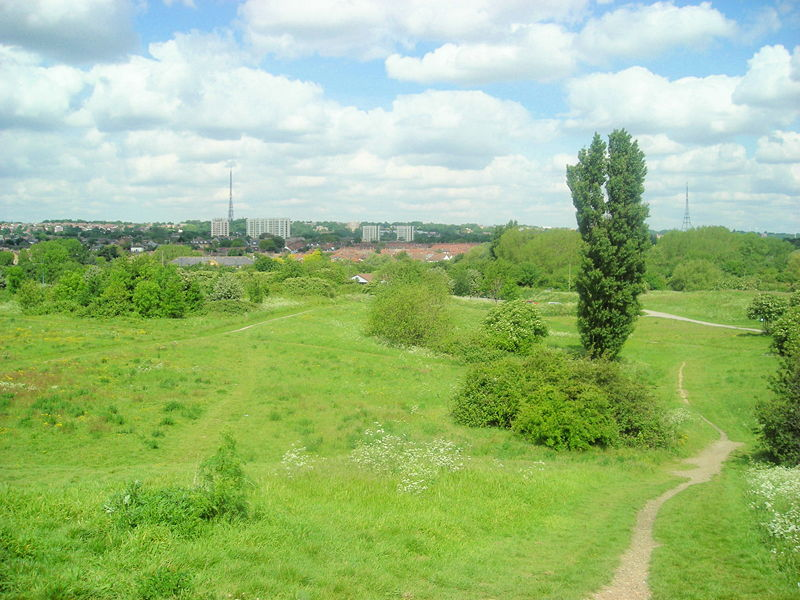
Part of South Norwood Country Park. In the background can be seen the aerials of the Croydon transmitting station to the left and the Crystal Palace transmitting station to the right.

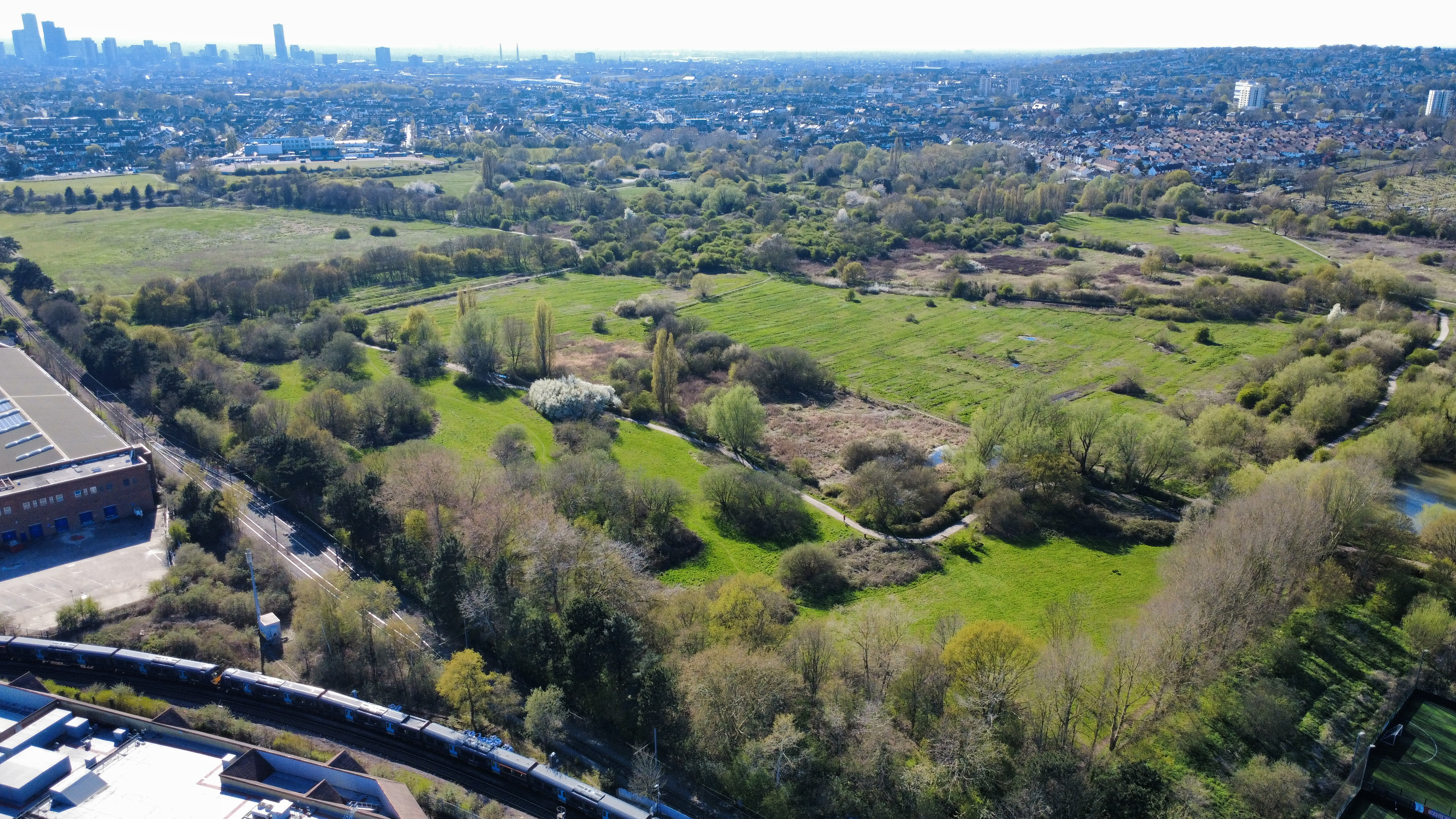
Looking WSW across the park from Elmers End Road.

South Norwood Country Park is a park in South Norwood, close to Elmers End and Birkbeck train stations. The historic Kent-Surrey border runs through the site, and since 1965 it has been located wholly in the London Borough of Croydon. It is a 47 hectare (116 acre) green space which opened in 1989. The park is a mix of countryside and parkland, and land formerly used for sewage farms serving the growing London population.

Croydon Sports Arena, the home of Croydon F.C., is on the south-eastern edge of the park. There is also a car park and visitor centre, and a duck pond similar to the one at South Norwood Lake.

== History ==
The site that is now known as South Norwood Country Park has undergone many changes in its long and chequered history, from the days of the Great North Wood to ancient moated house, sewage farm, farming, the war years, civil defence, allotments, wasteland, highways, refuse dump and now the Country Park.

=== La Motes medieval moated site ===
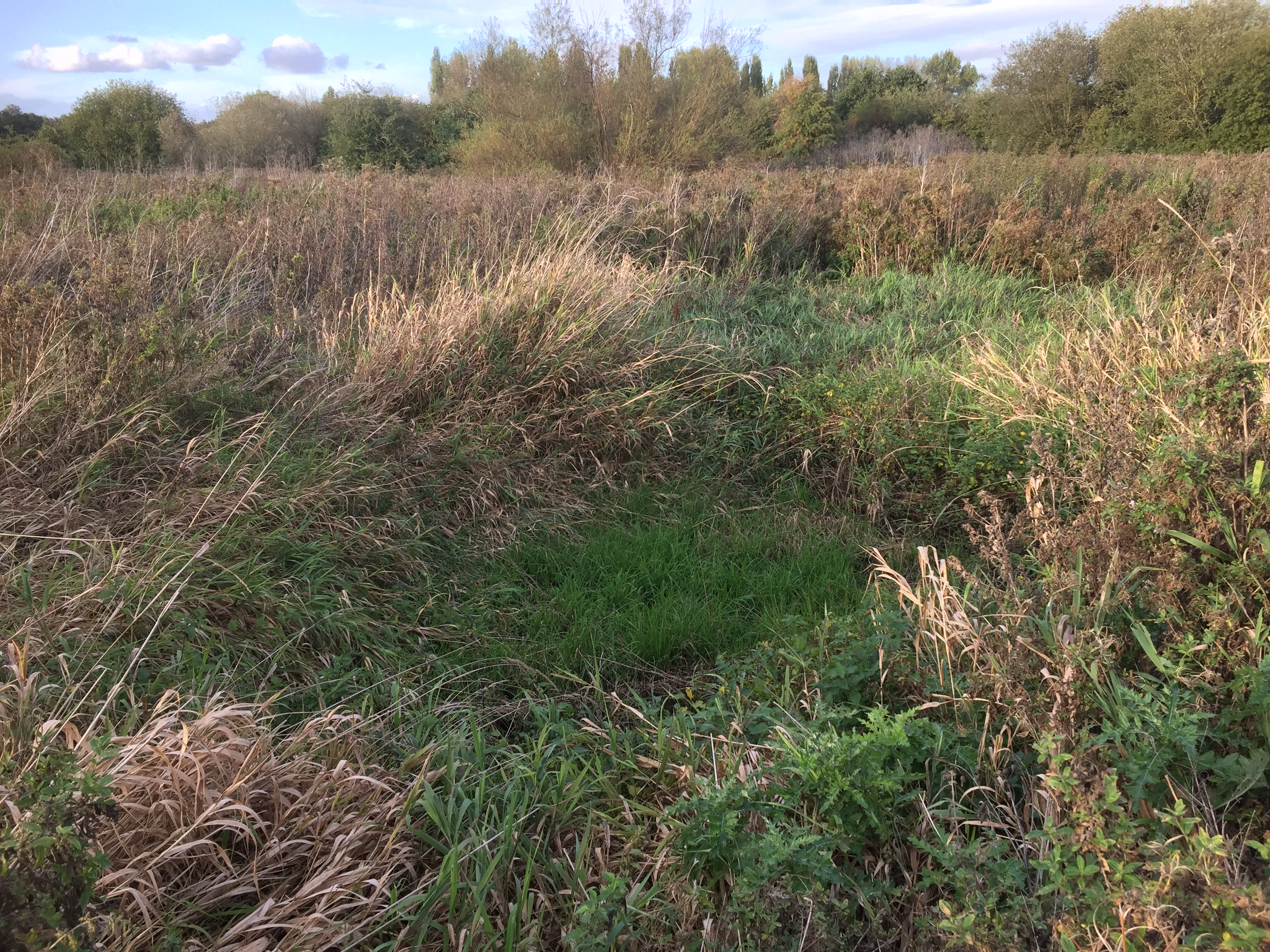
The site of the moat, now heavily overgrown and hard to make out

The Park was the location of a medieval moated manor, the site of which is a scheduled monument. An archaeological excavation was carried out in 1972 by Lillian Thornhill on behalf of the Croydon Natural History & Scientific Society in an attempt to ascertain the age of the double-sided moat shown on the Thomas Morley estate map of 1736 with the name La Motes. On an earlier estate map of Peter Burrell, the land is indicated as adjoining Sturts Land and is given the name Lame Oates which is obviously a phonetic corruption of La Motes.

Deeds of 1467 relate to a mortgage transaction at Leweland between Richard at Cherte and Stephan and John Fabian of London. At an earlier date, there is documentary evidence of a 13th- or 14th-century manor house of some importance on the site. The principal owner was Robert de Retford, one of the King's itinerant judges, active between 1295 and 1318. The low-lying position of the land, with streams flowing through it, raises the possibility of natural phenomena, such as the floods of 1315 to 1317, having played a part in the house's disappearance.

Most of the moated earthworks were filled in during the period when the site was used as a sewage farm. The site is formed of two concentric moats, in the middle of which is a square platform where the manor house once stood. The site is now heavily overgrown, though it can be made out on old aerial photographs.

=== Sewage farm ===
From about 1862 the land was acquired by Croydon Corporation for use as a sewage farm. This was largely unsuccessful because of the heavy London Clay subsoil that makes up the majority of the site. A series of concrete channels (some of which are still visible today) were constructed to direct the sewage over the numerous lagoons but these were a failure as the lagoons would remain flooded for months without draining away.

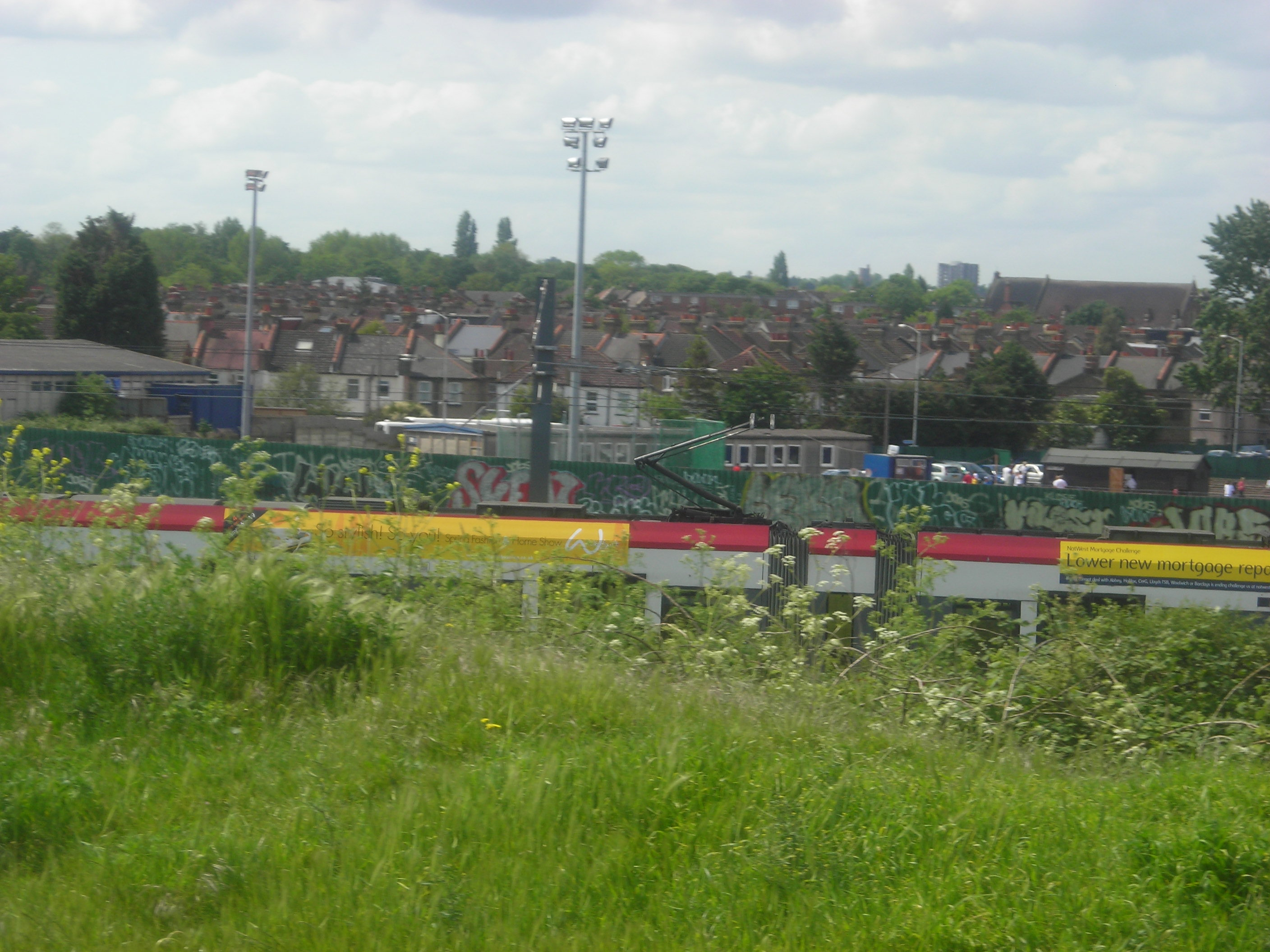
A tram going through the park

In the 1920s a new method for the treatment of sewage had to be found so the farm was largely abandoned and a new sewage treatment works was built on the area now used for the pitch and putt course. This was shut down in 1962 and the area was left mostly undisturbed until the creation of the Country Park in 1988–1999. It is still often referred to as 'the Sewage Farm' by the older local residents, however, despite not having been used as such for several decades. The manager of the farm was Albert David Prior.

=== War years ===
The years leading up to World War II brought about even more dramatic changes, with the armed forces using the area for training. During the war, the site became an A.R.P. (Air Raid Precaution) centre and the civil defence unit was also based here until the 1950s; there was even a ruined house that was specially constructed for the rescue services to practise in.

During the blitz, when hundreds of buildings were destroyed in Croydon (a heavily targeted town) and surrounding areas, much of the spoils were dumped on the land. This rubble eventually mounted up to form what is now the large hill behind the sports arena today. It is the principal viewpoint in the park and from the top of it you can see the London Docklands, Shirley Hills, Crystal Palace, Croydon, and as far east as Bromley.

It is the southern terminus of a cycling route from Greenwich, called the Waterlink Way.

== Playground ==
The playground at South Norwood Country Park has been rebuilt since it was shut down in 2006 due to health and safety issues.

During 2008 Croydon Council constructed a lottery-funded playground in a large space which was formerly part of the pitch and putt course. The equipment is intended for children aged 4 to 14.

== Wildlife ==
With a wide range of different habitats, the country park is a haven for wildlife and an important site for nature conservation. It is a Local Nature Reserve.

Many wetlands and ponds in Britain have become polluted or have disappeared, leaving the plants and animals that like wet conditions with fewer places to live. The Dragonfly Pond was built to encourage dragonflies and damselflies, and many other plants and animals such as frogs, toads and newts can be found there too. In the summer months the blue and green Emperor Dragonfly, the largest dragonfly in Britain, can be found there.

South Norwood Country Park has an excellent bird record with over 100 different species being sighted each year. The large wetlands in particular attract a wide variety of birds.

== See also ==
- List of parks and open spaces in the London Borough of Croydon
