= Woodside tram stop =

Tramlink tram stop in London, England

Woodside
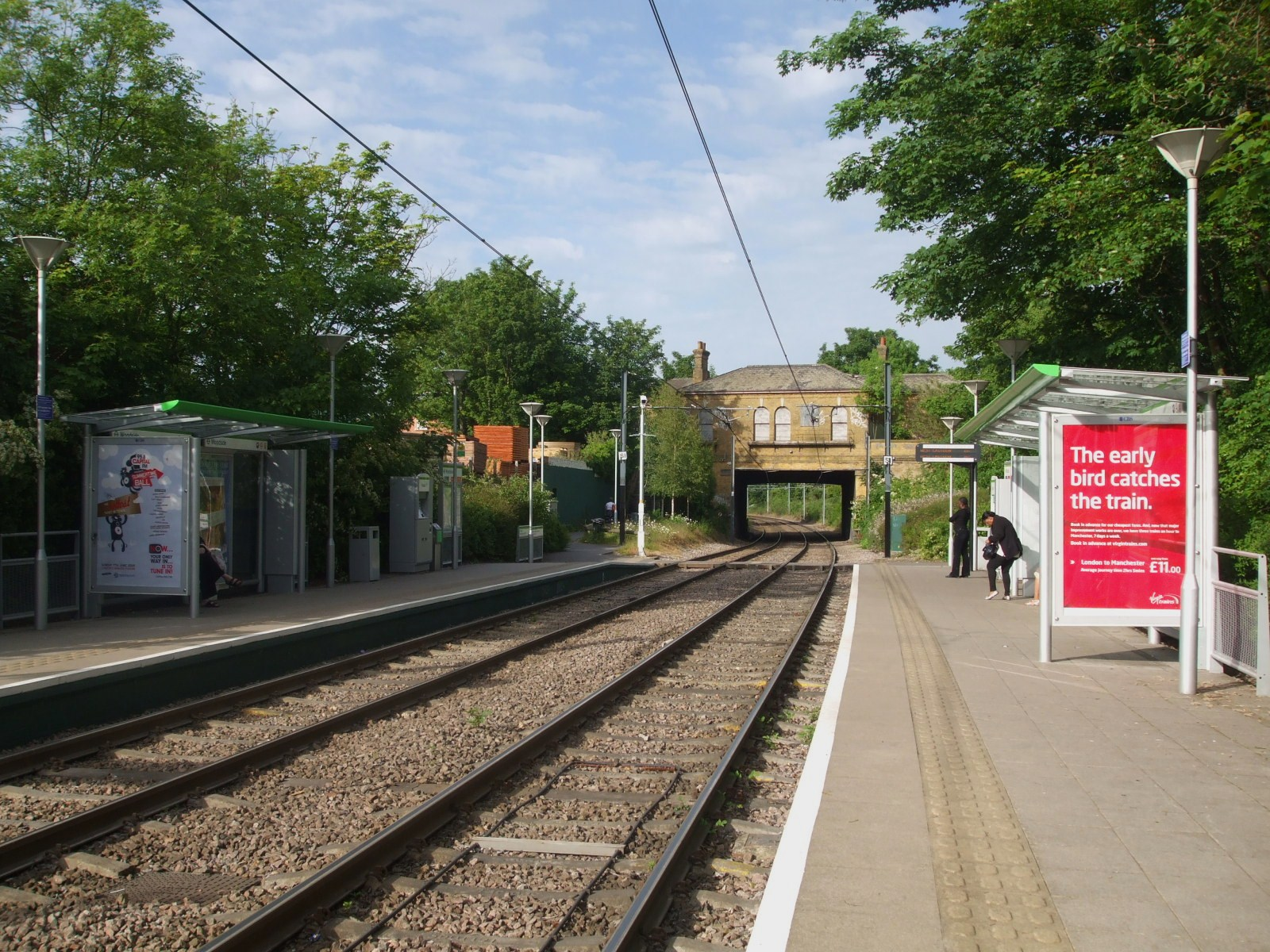
- View looking north towards old station building

General information
- Location: Spring Lane, Croydon
- Coordinates: 51.386987°N 0.065566°W
- Operated by: Tramlink
- Platforms: 2

Construction
- Structure type: At-grade
- Accessible: Yes

Other information
- Status: Unstaffed
- Website: Official website

History
- Opened: 23 May 2000
Location
- Location in Croydon

Woodside tram stop is a light rail stop situated between Woodside Green and Ashburton Park in the London Borough of Croydon in the southern suburbs of London. The stop is located on the site of the former Woodside railway station of the Woodside and South Croydon Railway; the old station buildings survive, though not used by Tramlink.

The tram stop has a platform on each side of the track with access to both platforms by stairs on the west side of the station building and by ramps on the east side.

== Services ==
The typical off-peak service in trams per hour from Woodside is:

- 6 tph in each direction between Beckenham Junction and Wimbledon
- 6 tph in each direction between Elmers End and Wimbledon

Services are operated using Bombardier CR4000 and Stadler Variobahn model low-floor trams.

Preceding station	Tramlink	Following station
Blackhorse Lane towards Wimbledon	Tramlink; Wimbledon to Beckenham Junction	Arena (Croydon) towards Beckenham Junction
Blackhorse Lane towards Wimbledon	Tramlink; Wimbledon to Elmers End	Arena (Croydon) towards Elmers End

== Connections ==
London Buses routes 130 and 312 serve the tram stop.

Free interchange for journeys made within an hour is available between trams and buses as part of Transport for London's Hopper Fare.

== See also ==
- Woodside railway station
- Woodside and South Croydon Railway
