= Parks and open spaces in the London Borough of Croydon =

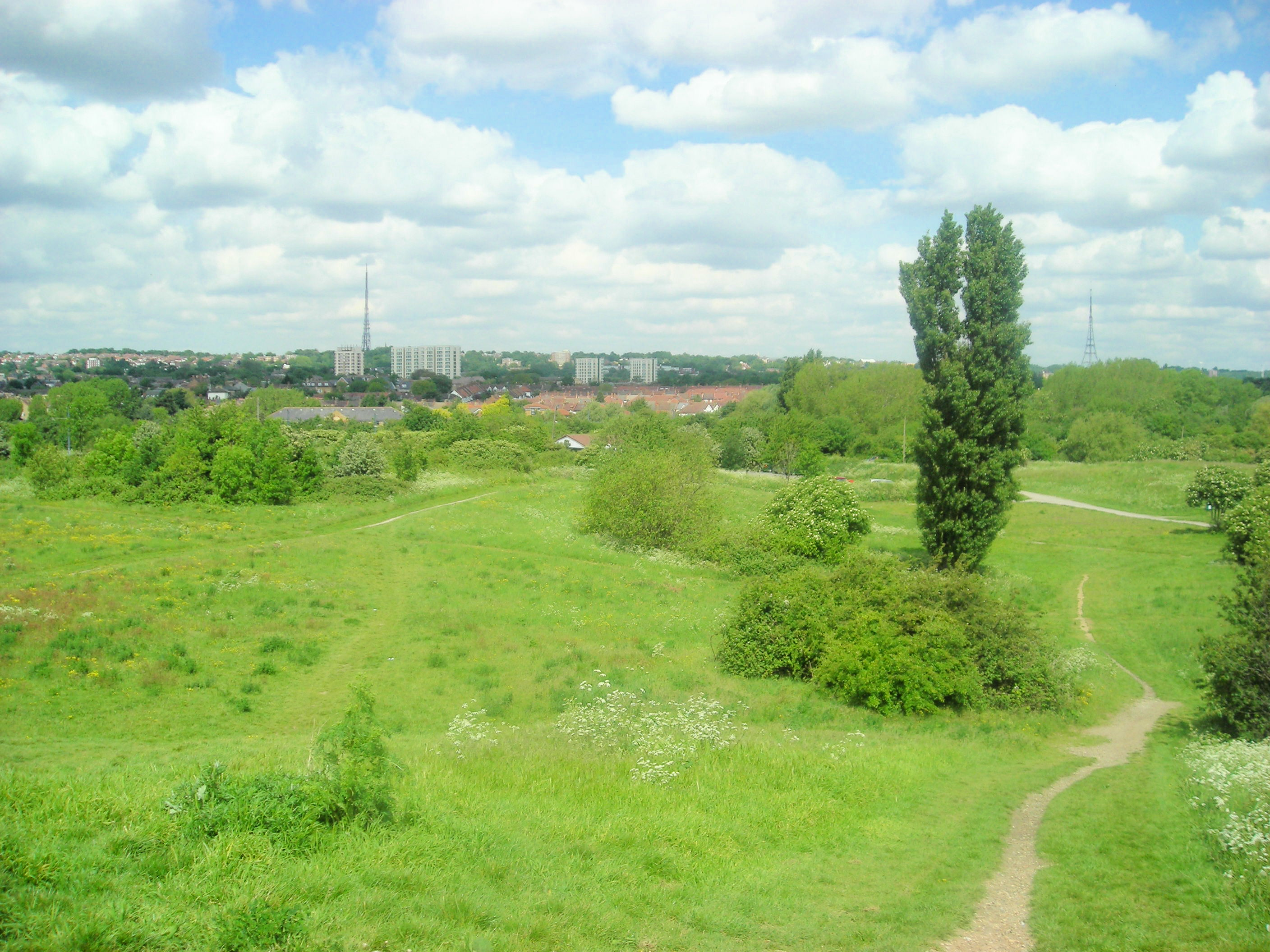
A section of South Norwood Country Park, in Greater London

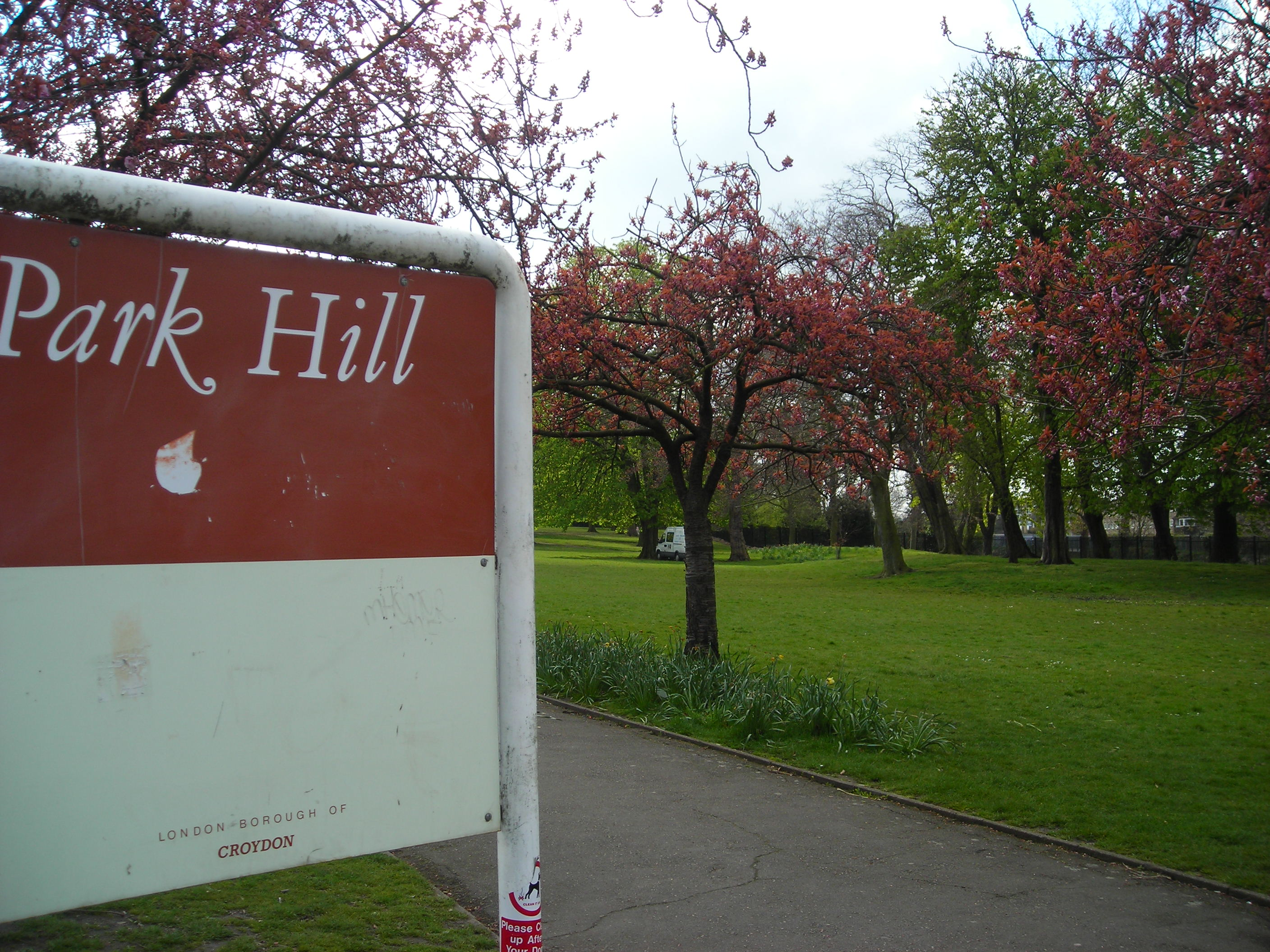
Park Hill Recreation Ground, an example of an urban park in Croydon

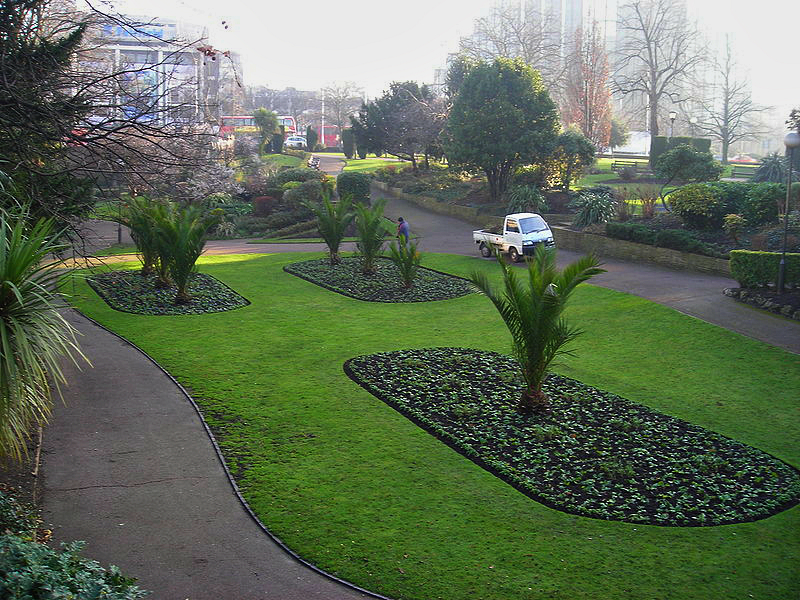
Queen's Gardens urban parkland area in Central Croydon

The London Borough of Croydon has over 120 parks and open spaces within its boundaries, ranging from the 200 acre (80ha) Selsdon Wood Nature Reserve to many recreation grounds and sports fields scattered throughout the Borough. Croydon covers an area of 86.52 km^{2}, the 256th largest district in England. Croydon's physical features consist of many hills and rivers that are spread out across the borough and into the North Downs, Surrey and the rest of South London. Some of the open spaces in Croydon form part of the well-known London LOOP walks where the first section was opened on 3 May 1996 with a ceremony on Farthing Downs in Coulsdon. As a borough in Outer London it also contains some open countryside in the form of country parks. Croydon Council is associated with several other boroughs who are taking part in the Downlands Countryside Management Project. These boroughs are Sutton; and by Surrey County Council; the City of London Corporation; the Surrey districts of Reigate and Banstead and Tandridge; and the Countryside Agency. An additional partner is Natural Britain.

Duppas Hill was Croydon's first public recreation ground, bought by the Board of Health in 1865. Addington Hills is a major floodplain in London for the Thames Valley and is recognised as a significant obstacle to the growth of London from its origins as a port on the north side of the river, to a large circular city. Mitcham Common also forms part of the borough although it is only partly in Croydon, the London Borough of Merton has the dominant half of the common, while Sutton make up most of the south side.

The Queen's Gardens, Park Hill and Norwood Grove are examples of ornamental gardens in the Borough.

There are also many recreation grounds such as the one in South Norwood which is currently undergoing major refurbishment works. Examples of meadows include Heavers Meadow and Brickfields Meadow both located in South Norwood.

== History ==
The Great North Wood was a natural oak forest that covered the Sydenham Ridge and the southern reaches of the River Effra and its tributaries. It is a major part of the history of Croydon. The most notable tree, called Vicar's Oak, marked the boundary of four ancient parishes; Lambeth, Camberwell, Croydon and Bromley. John Aubrey referred to this "ancient remarkable tree" in the past tense as early as 1718, but according to JB Wilson, the Vicar's Oak survived until 1825. The earliest surviving mention of the wood dates from assize records in 1272, and it was known to be owned by the Whitehorse family during the reign of King Edward III. When Oliver Cromwell seized it from the Archbishop of Canterbury it was measured to cover 830 acres (3.4 km^{2}), but held only 9,200 oaken pollards. At this time it was known to stretch as far as Streatham from Croydon. Much timber was taken from the woodlands for use in the Royal Dockyard at Deptford as well for charcoal burning and building purposes. Much of the surviving woodlands were cleared and developed as a result of the Croydon Inclosure Act 1797 (37 Geo. 3. c. 144 Pr.) and sale of the late Lord Thurlow's estates in 1806, although some substantial fragments remain, notably the nature reserves at Dulwich Wood and Sydenham Hill Wood.

== Principal open spaces ==
Apart from smaller green areas such as sports grounds and smaller gardens, and Selsdon Wood, which is National Trust property, the following are the major open spaces in the Borough:

=== Croydon North ===
- Norwood Grove, Upper Norwood : Mansion, ornamental grounds and parkland, 34.5 acres (14ha)
- South Norwood Country Park, South Norwood : former sewage farm, 125 acres (50ha)
- South Norwood Lake and Grounds, South Norwood : large lake land and green space area, 28 acres (11ha)

=== Croydon Central ===
- Lloyd Park , Croydon : founded by Frank Lloyd, 114 acres (46ha)
- Addington Hills, Addington : also named Shirley Hills
- Queen's Gardens, Central Croydon : urban park next to the Croydon Clocktower
- Park Hill Recreation Ground : urban park beside the railway and including prominent water tower, 15 acres (6.1 ha)
- Duppas Hill, Waddon
- Addington Vale, Addington : former green belt land, public open space in 1963, 48 acres (19ha)
- Mitcham Common, Merton : area of large common land, 460 acres (182ha)
- Purley Way Playing Fields, Waddon : large green space next to the Croydon Colonnades, 109 acres (43.81ha)

=== Croydon South ===
- Happy Valley Park, Old Coulsdon : countryside area, 252 acres (101ha)
- Farthing Downs, Coulsdon : another countryside area in the borough, notable for its walking trails
- Foxley Wood, Purley : An ancient urban woodland with Nature Reserve status noted for its diversity of flora and wildlife encompassed in an urban location featuring a nature trail. The Friends of Foxley in association with London Borough of Croydon manage the woodland.

== Water ==
The River Wandle is also a major tributary of the River Thames, where it stretches to Wandsworth and Putney for 9 miles (14 km) from its main source in Waddon. It forms a rough western boundary with the London Borough of Sutton, and for part of its length forms the boundary between the London Boroughs of Croydon and Lambeth The main river ends at Waddon with one of its tributaries ending in Selhurst. Another tributary starts in Thornton Heath as the Norbury Brook, becomes the River Graveney and joins the Wandle near Summerstown.

Wandle Park is one of 11 parks throughout Greater London chosen to receive money for redevelopment by a public vote. The park received £400,000 towards better footpaths, more lighting, refurbished public toilets and new play areas for children.

== Climate ==
The amount of green spaces in area can affect the climate of that particular area. Croydon has a temperate climate in common with most areas of Great Britain, it is similar to that of Greenwich in Inner London: its Köppen climate classification is Cfb. Its mean annual temperature of 9.6 °C is similar to that experienced throughout the Weald, and slightly cooler than nearby areas such as the Sussex coast and Central London. Rainfall is considerably below England's average (1971–2000) level of 838 mm, and every month is drier overall than the England average.

Climate data for London Borough of Croydon
Month	Jan	Feb	Mar	Apr	May	Jun	Jul	Aug	Sep	Oct	Nov	Dec	Year
Mean daily maximum °F	38	39	42	46	52	57	61	61	56	51	43	40	49
Mean daily minimum °F	34	34	36	38	44	50	53	52	48	44	48	36	42
Average precipitation inches	1.2	1.2	1.6	1.2	1.6	1.2	1.6	1.6	2.8	2.0	2.0	2.4	2.00
Mean daily maximum °C	3	4	5	7	11	14	16	16	13	10	6	4	9
Mean daily minimum °C	5	5	6	8	10	13	15	16	13	11	8	5	9
Average precipitation cm	3	3	4	3	4	3	4	4	7	5	5	6	5.07
Source: Weatherbase

== See also ==
- List of parks and open spaces in Croydon
- Parks and open spaces in London
