= List of parks and open spaces in the London Borough of Croydon =

This is a list of parks and open spaces within the boundary of the London Borough of Croydon, England.

== A ==
Name	Place	Area	Image
Addington Hills	Shirley	130 acres (53 ha)	
Addington Park	Addington	24.5 acres (9.9 ha)	
Addington Vale	New Addington	48 acres (19 ha)	
Addiscombe Railway Park	Addiscombe	4 acres (1.6 ha)	
Addiscombe Recreation Ground	Addiscombe	8 acres (3.2 ha)	
Apsley Road Playground	South Norwood	0.25 acres (0.10 ha)	
Ashburton Park	Woodside	18.5 acres (7.5 ha)	
Ashburton Playing Fields	Woodside	49.5 acres (20.0 ha)	

== B ==
Name	Place	Area	Image
Beaulieu Heights	South Norwood	16 acres (6.5 ha)	
Betts Mead Recreation Ground	Kenley	30 acres (12 ha)	
Beulah Hill Pond	Upper Norwood	1.5 acres (0.61 ha)	
Biggin Wood	Upper Norwood	13.5 acres (5.5 ha)	
Birchwood and Castle Hill Ruffetts	New Addington	37.25 acres (15.07 ha)	
Boulogne Road Playground	Thornton Heath	1.5 acres (0.61 ha)	
Boundary Woods	New Addington	4.25 acres (1.72 ha)	
Bourne Park	Kenley	8.5 acres (3.4 ha)	
Bradmore Green	Old Coulsdon	4 acres (1.6 ha)	
Bramley Bank	Shirley	24 acres (9.7 ha)	
Brickfields Meadow	South Norwood	4.37 ha (10.8 acres)	

== C ==
Name	Place	Area	Image
Canterbury Road Recreation Ground	Broad Green	4.5 acres (1.8 ha)	
Central Nursery	Shirley	10.5 acres (4.2 ha)	
Chaldon Way Gardens	Coulsdon	0.49 acres (0.20 ha)	
Coombe Wood	Shirley	5.67 ha (14.0 acres)	
Copse Hill Spinney	Purley	1 acre (0.40 ha)	
Cotelands	Croydon	0.2 ha (0.49 acres)	
Coulsdon Memorial Ground	Coulsdon	10 acres (4.0 ha)	
Courtwood Children's Playground	Forestdale	0.74 acres (0.30 ha)	
Croham Hurst	South Croydon	34.3 ha (85 acres)	

== D ==
Name	Place	Area	Image
Dartnell Road Wayside Amentity Area	Woodside	0.15 acres (0.061 ha)	
Duppas Hill	Croydon	34 acres (14 ha)	

== F ==
Name	Place	Area	Image
Fairfield Gardens	Croydon	2 acres (0.81 ha)	
Falconwood Meadow	Forestdale	3.5 acres (1.4 ha)	
Farthing Downs	Coulsdon	235 acres (95 ha)	
Foxearth Spinney	Selsdon	0.25 acres (0.10 ha)	
Foxes Wood	Shirley	8.105 acres (3.280 ha)	
Foxley Wood	Purley	26.5 acres (10.7 ha)	
Fox Shaw	Selsdon	9.75 acres (3.95 ha)	

== G ==
Name	Place	Area	Image
Glade Wood	Monks Orchard	3 acres (1.2 ha)	
Grange Park	Old Coulsdon	11 acres (4.5 ha)	
Grangewood Park	South Norwood	27.75 acres (11.23 ha)	
Green Lane Sports Ground	Norbury	10 acres (4.0 ha)	

== H ==
Name	Place	Area	Image
Haling Grove	South Croydon	10 acres (4.0 ha)	
Hamsey Green Pond	Sanderstead	0.08 ha (0.20 acres)	
Happy Valley Park	Old Coulsdon	252.5 acres (102.2 ha)	
Hawkhirst	Kenley	35.5 acres (14.4 ha)	
Heathfield	Addington	18 acres (7.3 ha)	
Heavers Meadow	Selhurst	8.75 acres (3.54 ha)	
Higher Drive Recreation Ground	Purley	12.5 acres (5.1 ha)	
Hutchinson's Bank	New Addington	54 acres (22 ha)	

== I ==
Name	Place	Area	Image
Inwood	Old Coulsdon	5 acres (2.0 ha)	

== J ==
Name	Place	Area	Image
Jewel's Wood	New Addington	38.5 acres (15.6 ha)	

== K ==
Name	Place	Area	Image
Kenley Common	Kenley	138 acres (56 ha)	
King George's Field	Selhurst	3 acres (1.2 ha)	
Kings Wood	Sanderstead	147.5 acres (59.7 ha)	

== L ==
Name	Place	Area	Image
Ladygrove	Forestdale	0.25 acres (0.10 ha)	
Little Road Playground	Addiscombe	0.25 acres (0.10 ha)	
Littleheath Woods	Selsdon	64 acres (26 ha)	
Lloyd Park	Croydon	114 acres (46 ha)	
Long Lane Wood	Monks Orchard	15 acres (6.1 ha)	

== M ==
Name	Place	Area	Image
Mayfield Road Playground	Thornton Heath	1.5 acres (0.61 ha)	
Millers Pond	Shirley	4 acres (1.6 ha)	
Millstock	Hooley	60 acres (24 ha)	
Milne Park	New Addington	17 acres (6.9 ha)	
Mitcham Common	Mitcham	460 acres (190 ha)	

== N ==
Name	Place	Area	Image
Norbury Hall Park	Norbury	8 acres (3.2 ha)	
Norbury Park	Norbury	28.5 acres (11.5 ha)	
Northborough Road Playground	Norbury	3 acres (1.2 ha)	
Northbrook Road Playground	Thornton Heath	0.75 acres (0.30 ha)	
North Down Recreation Ground	New Addington	28.5 acres (11.5 ha)	
Northwood Road Playground	Norbury	0.25 acres (0.10 ha)	
Norwood Grove	Upper Norwood	13.62 ha (33.7 acres)	

== O ==
Name	Place	Area	Image
Oakland Wood	South Norwood	0.16 ha (0.40 acres)	

== P ==
Name	Place	Area	Image
Park Hill Recreation Ground	Croydon	15 acres (6.1 ha)	
Parkfields	Monks Orchard	13.25 acres (5.36 ha)	
Pinewood	Shirley	11 acres (4.5 ha)	
Pollards Hill Park	Pollards Hill	7.75 acres (3.14 ha)	
Promenade De Verdun	Woodcote	1 acre (0.40 ha)	
Purley Beeches	Sanderstead	17.75 acres (7.18 ha)	
Purley Way Playing Fields	Waddon	109 acres (44 ha)	
Purley Way West	Waddon	20.75 acres (8.40 ha)	

== Q ==
Name	Place	Area	Image
Queen's Gardens	Croydon	2.25 acres (0.91 ha)	
Queenhill Road Playspace	Selsdon	2.25 acres (0.91 ha)	

== R ==
Name	Place	Area	Image
Ragged Grove	Sanderstead	3 acres (1.2 ha)	
Rickman Hill	Coulsdon	16.5 acres (6.7 ha)	
Riddlesdown Common	Kenley	37 acres (15 ha)	
Rotary Field	Purley	4.5 acres (1.8 ha)	
Rowdown Field	New Addington	29.2 acres (11.8 ha)	
Rowdown Wood	New Addington	34 acres (14 ha)	

== S ==
Name	Place	Area	Image
Sanderstead Plantation	Sanderstead	21.75 acres (8.80 ha)	
Sanderstead Pond	Sanderstead	3.5 acres (1.4 ha)	
Sanderstead Recreation Ground	Sanderstead	19.5 acres (7.9 ha)	
Selsdon Recreation Ground	Selsdon	10 acres (4.0 ha)	
Selsdon Wood	Selsdon	200 acres (81 ha)	
Shirley Church Recreation Ground	Shirley	8.5 acres (3.4 ha)	
Shirley Heath	Shirley	68 acres (28 ha)	
Shirley Park Estate	Shirley	11 acres (4.5 ha)	
South Croydon Recreation Ground	South Croydon	8.5 acres (3.4 ha)	
South Norwood Country Park	South Norwood	125 acres (51 ha)	
South Norwood Lake and Grounds	South Norwood	28.5 acres (11.5 ha)	
South Norwood Recreation Ground	South Norwood	14 acres (5.7 ha)	
Spring Park Wood	Shirley	7 acres (2.8 ha)	
St. James' Church Rest Garden	Croydon	2 acres (0.81 ha)	
St. Johns Memorial Garden	Old Town	2 acres (0.81 ha)	
Stambourne Woodland Walk	Upper Norwood	4.75 acres (1.92 ha)	
Stroud Green Well	Shirley	2.78 ha (6.9 acres)	

== T ==
Name	Place	Area	Image
Temple Avenue Copse	Shirley	1 acre (0.40 ha)	
The Avenue	Kenley	4.75 acres (1.92 ha)	
The Beeches	Sanderstead	2.75 acres (1.11 ha)	
The Lawns	Upper Norwood	15.5 acres (6.3 ha)	
The Ruffet	South Croydon	2.5 acres (1.0 ha)	
Thornton Heath Recreation Ground	Thornton Heath	13.5 acres (5.5 ha)	
Three Corner Grove	New Addington	4 acres (1.6 ha)	
Threehalfpenny Wood	Addington	25 acres (10 ha)	
Trumble Gardens	Thornton Heath	3 acres (1.2 ha)	

== U ==
Name	Place	Area	Image
Upper Norwood Recreation Ground	Upper Norwood	19 acres (7.7 ha)	

== W ==
Name	Place	Area	Image
Waddon Ponds	Waddon	8.5 acres (3.4 ha)	
Wandle Park	Waddon	21 acres (8.5 ha)	
Westow Park	Upper Norwood	6.75 acres (2.73 ha)	
Wettern Tree Garden	Sanderstead	2.75 acres (1.11 ha)	
Whitehorse Meadow	South Norwood	1.09 ha (2.7 acres)	
Whitehorse Road Recreation Ground	Croydon	4.5 acres (1.8 ha)	
Wilford Road Recreation Ground	Croydon	2.75 acres (1.11 ha)	
Woodcote Grove Recreation Ground	Coulsdon	10 acres (4.0 ha)	
Woodcote Village Green	Purley	3.5 acres (1.4 ha)	
Woodside Green	Woodside	4.75 acres (1.92 ha)	

== See also ==
- Croydon parks and open spaces
- London LOOP
