= Addington =

Addington may refer to:

== Places ==
=== Australia ===
- Addington, Victoria, a town

=== Canada ===
- Addington County, Ontario, a former county (now Lennox and Addington County, Ontario)
- Addington Highlands, Ontario, a township
- Addington Parish, New Brunswick, a parish
- Addington (federal electoral district), an electoral district

=== England ===
- Addington, Bradford
- Addington, Buckinghamshire, a village and civil parish
- Addington, Cornwall, a residential area
- Addington, Kent, a village
  - Addington long barrow an archaeological site nearby
- Addington, Lancashire, near Carnforth
- Addington, London, an area within the London Borough of Croydon, and site of the following:
  - Addington Palace
  - Addington Park
  - Addington Village tram stop
  - Addington Cricket Club
- New Addington, another area within the London Borough of Croydon, site of the following:
  - Addington Vale park
  - New Addington tram stop
- Addington Hills park, in Upper Shirley, formerly part of Addington
- Great Addington, a village and civil parish in Northamptonshire

=== New Zealand ===
- Addington, New Zealand, a suburb of Christchurch

=== United States ===
- Addington Mill, North Carolina
- Addington, Oklahoma, a town
- Addington, Virginia

== People ==
- Addington (surname)

== Other uses ==
- Baron Addington, a title in the Peerage of the UK
- Addington F.C., a South African soccer club
- Addington Field, an airport serving Elizabethtown, Kentucky, USA
- Addington Railway Workshops, a railway facility in Christchurch, New Zealand
