= Mrs Meer Hassan Ali =

British author

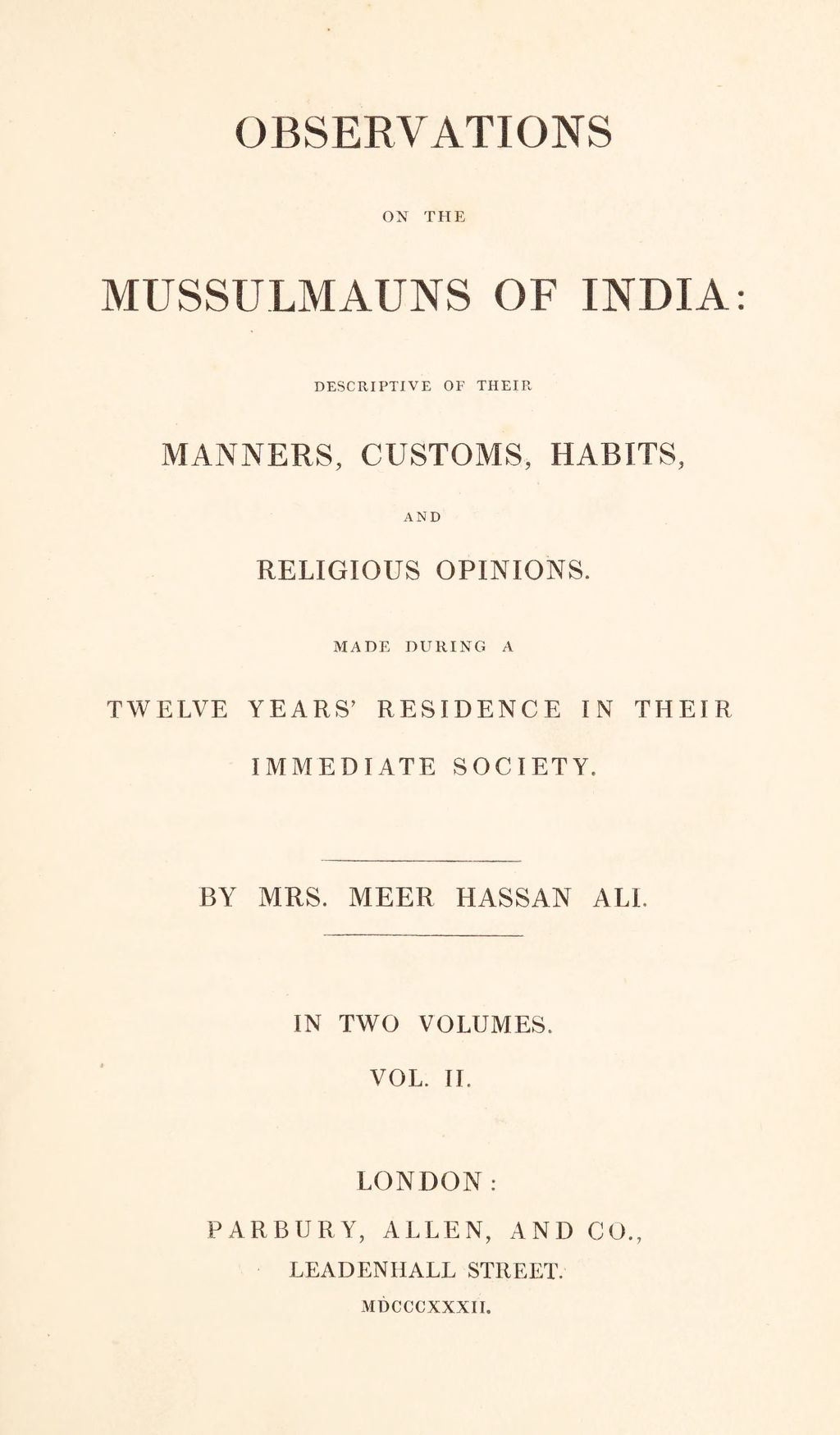
- Observations on the Mussulmauns of India
- Born: Biddy Timms late 1700s
- Died: after 1832
- Occupation: writer
- Writing career
- Subject: Shia Muslim life in India

Mrs Meer Hassan Ali (né: Biddy Timms) (born late 1700s - after 1832) was a British author who lived in a Shia Muslim household in Lucknow in India. Her book provided an objective insight into how Muslims lived in India and helped correct popular misunderstanding in Britain.

== Life ==
She was born Biddy Timms. She came to notice when she met and married Meer Hassan Ali who was an Indian Muslim who was employed in Addiscombe in south London as an assistant teacher. They married on 27 March 1817 at St James's Church in London and she was aged 21 or older. Her husband became disillusioned at the progress in his career in the Oriental department of East India Company's military college. He was also not well and he resigned in 1816. She and her husband moved to India in 1817. She remained a Christian and she wore western clothing but she gained access to, and understanding of, the life of Shia Muslims in Lucknow as she spoke fluent Hindustani.

After ten years she returned to Britain leaving her husband in India. The reason why she abandoned the marriage is unknown. It has been speculated that because they did not have any children then her husband may have taken additional wives. She would explain in her book that although Muslim men could take additional wives the reason was to obtain an heir and the additional wives were always secondary to the first wife.

The book was called Observations on the Mussulmauns of India and it was published in 1832 in two volumes. Other British writers had written travelogues about their travels in India, but her book was not structured as an account of her life. The book was divided into sections and it covered various aspects of life in Lucknow.

Her life after she returned is not well known. It is said that she worked in a British school, but there are few details, and the date or place of her death are unknown. Her book is held in various collections include that of the government of India.
