= Park Hill Recreation Ground =

Park in Croydon, London, England

Park Hill
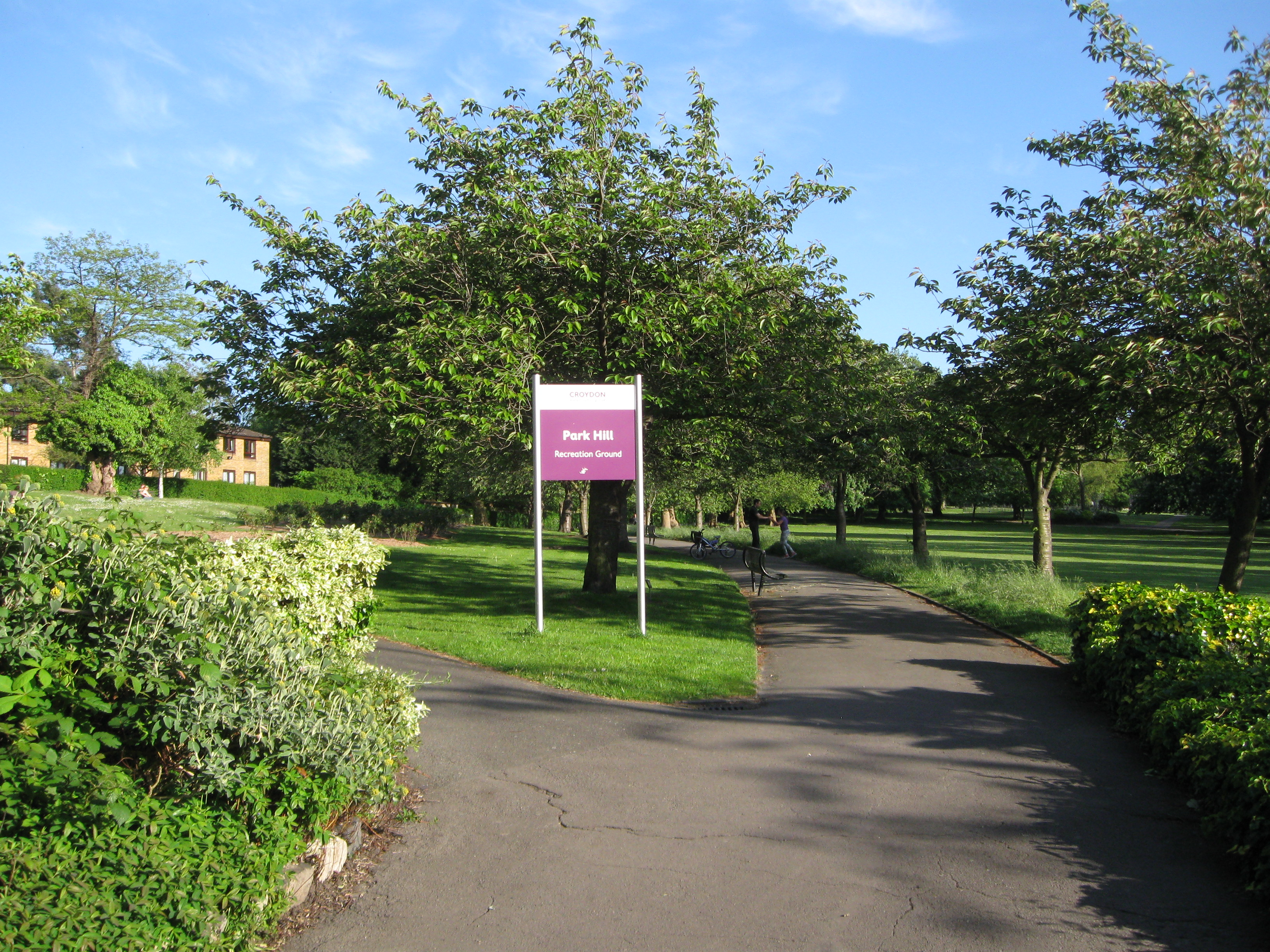
- Park Hill Recreation Ground entrance from Central Croydon side

- Location within Greater London
- Type: Public park
- Location: Croydon
- Coordinates: 51.37117°N 0.08924°W
- Operator: London Borough of Croydon
- Status: Open all year (closed at night)
- Public transit: East Croydon station, South Croydon railway station London Buses, route 64; route 433 to Birdhurst Gardens stop.

Park Hill Recreation Ground is a 15 acres (6.1 ha) park near the centre of Croydon, Greater London, managed by the London Borough of Croydon. It runs from Barclay Road to Coombe Road beside the railway line, with the main entrances on Water Tower Hill and Barclay Road. The nearest stations (equidistant to the park) are East Croydon to the north for Tramlink and National Rail services and South Croydon to the south for National Rail. The park was officially renamed as Park Hill in 1964.

At the southern end, at the very top of the hill which forms the park, it joins the grounds of Coombe Cliff once the home of members of the Horniman Tea family. From there a steep drive winds down to Coombe Road where a footpath leads to South Croydon railway station for National Rail. The grounds now form part of the park and are open to the public, but the house itself, is not. As of October 2018, it is used for educational purposes. Where the drive meets Coombe Road there is a further entrance and a gatehouse, which is now privately owned for residential purposes. The house is grade II listed.

Previously, the site was a reservoir, but in the 1880s, it was transformed into a public park. The park offers various amenities, such as refreshments, sports facilities, and a walled herb garden.

In his memoirs, The Chronicles of Wasted Time (1973), Malcolm Muggeridge reminisces about the park being a childhood playground where he and his father would frequently walk together and engage in discussions about socialism and world affairs. He compared the water tower to the "dark tower" described in a poem by Robert Browning.

== History ==
=== Croydon Park ===
The recreation ground is the remnant of the Archbishop of Canterbury’s Croydon Park. It was about 210 acres and was probably similar to today's Selsdon wood nature reserve. It dates back to at least the 14th century and in 1382 Sir William Walworth was appointed the park's keeper. On 28 April 1540 it was exchanged as part of a package to Henry VIII for Malling Abbey and other lands. It reverted back to Archbishop Cranmer soon after the King’s death, by his will. By the 18th century Croydon Palace was no longer used, having fallen into a state of disrepair and in 1726 the park was leased to William Busick of Mitcham. It was cultivated into farmland and in 1813 it was leased in 13 lots.

=== Reservoir ===
With the consent of his tenant Thomas Weaver, the Archbishop sold just over an acre of Bean Hill to Croydon’s local board of health for a reservoir on 2 November 1850. The reservoir was an approximate brick cylinder 75'(22.9m) in diameter and 50'(15.2m) tall, with a 20'(6.1m) high domed roof. It had a stone floor and was lined with Portland cement. The reservoir was strengthen by sixteen vertical ribs and covered with earth several feet thick that also kept the water at a constant temperature throughout the year. The brickwork also curved inwards between the ribs to help withstand the pressure from the water. It was designed by the board’s consulting engineer William Ranger and built by the local builder William Harris. Water was pumped from a well at the newly constructed Surrey Street pumping station into the reservoir and provided the town with a constant supply of fresh piped water under gravity. The railway cutting meant that a wooden bridge had to be constructed to carry the cast iron water main from the well to the reservoir, where Barclay Road now crosses. The Surrey Street pumping station and reservoir were opened by the 71-year-old Archbishop John Bird Sumner on 11 December 1851. The party descended into the bottom of the reservoir by a temporary wooden staircase under candlelight to see the water pumped from the well arrive at the reservoir.

The reservoir could hold 900,000 gallons and was estimated to supply the town with water for about 18 days. By April 1853, the town was consuming 450,000 gallons daily and 1.5M gallons daily before the end of 1866. The reservoir was nevertheless useful in ensuring water could be supplied to households in the higher areas of the town. By June 1866 water levels in the reservoir were low because demand exceeded supply and water was limited to certain daylight hours to allow the reservoir to refill sufficiently to reach households in the higher areas. The reservoir became redundant when the Russell Hill reservoir (at the south end of the Purley Way playing fields) opened in 1923.

Although the Park Hill reservoir leaked, it was kept full during the second world war for fire-fighting purposes. The reservoir remains roofless under the mound to the south of the later water tower. By 1971 the domed roof had become structurally unsafe and was demolished and the reservoir backfilled.

Reservoir Hill as it became known, was frequented by the public probably since before the reservoir was built and certainly by 1872 when a drinking fountain was vandalised. It was accessed by a footpath known as Lover's Walk, part of today’s Chichester Road and the nearby entrance to the recreation ground.

=== Croydon Water Tower ===
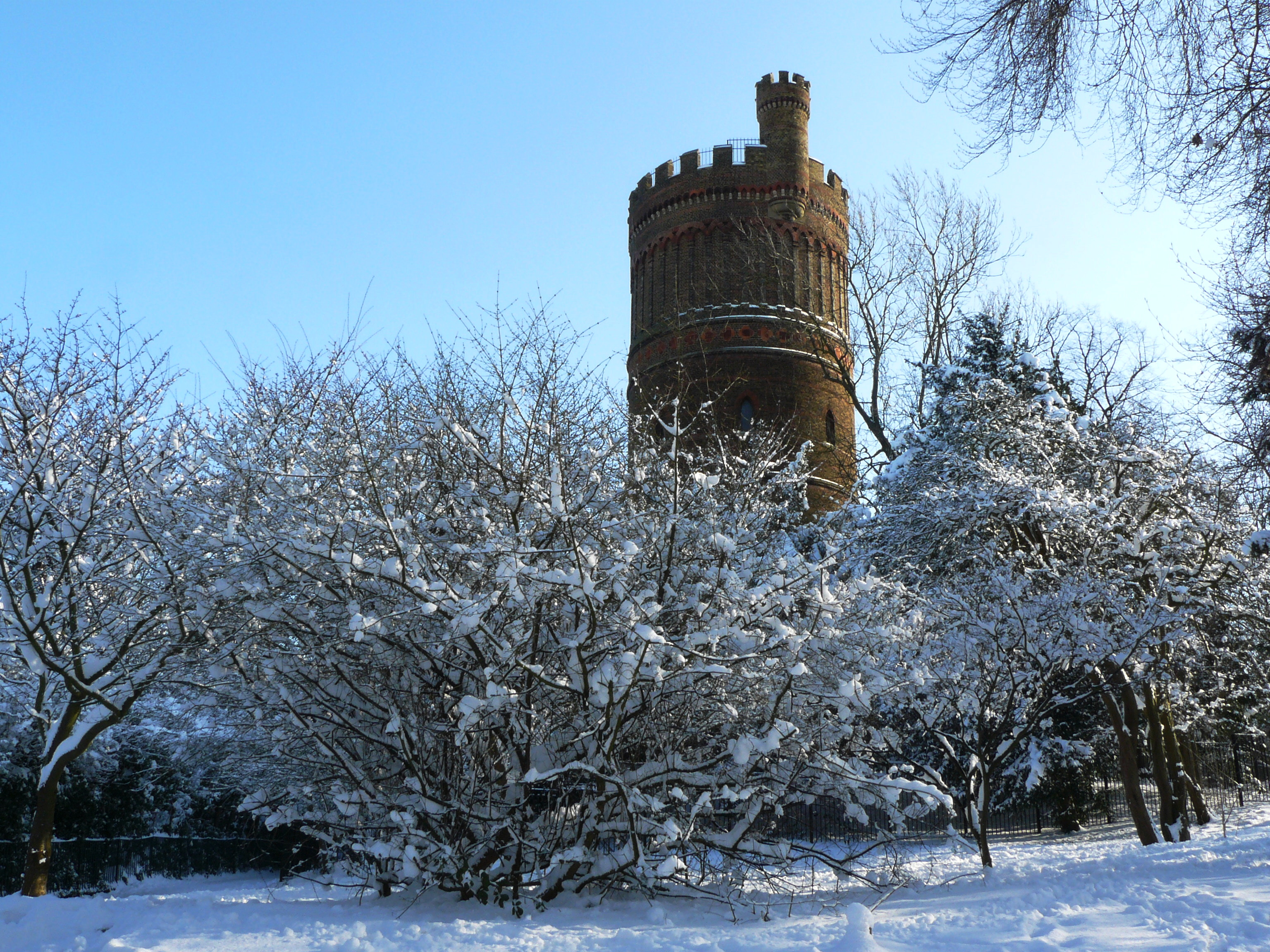
Croydon Water Tower

The park is the site of the historic Croydon Water Tower. It enabled the highest areas of the parish to be supplied with water and was designed by the board of health's engineer Baldwin Latham in Norman style with a bartizan or overhanging turret. Built in 1867, by John Thomas Chappell of Steyning, Sussex in brown brick, with red brick decoration to a height of 125'(38.1m) above the foundations. A 94,000 gallon brick tank in the base of the tower was connected to the reservoir and the water was pumped to a smaller 40,000 gallon wrought iron tank at the top by a horizontal rotary engine from the North Moor Foundry Company of Oldham. The engine was located in an engine house slightly to the west of the tower. The engine was powered by steam from a pair of Field’s patent vertical boilers from Bow.

It ceased to provide water to higher areas of the borough by 1923, having become redundant when the Addington reservoir supplied Croydon’s high level district from the Addington well, which opened in 1888. As of September 2015, the building is grade II listed, but is disused and not open to the public. The tower was opened to the public in the Easter of 1889 as a viewing platform for a penny admission and opened for several years during the summer season after a safety rail was added and the stairs widened.

The engine house was demolished in the 1950s and the wrought iron tank removed in 1971 with other fixtures and fittings.

=== Recreation ground ===
The need for public open spaces had been recognised and after protracted discussions, which started in 1880, Croydon Corporation (the successor to the Croydon Local Board of Health) purchased 8 acres of Park Hill from the Ecclesiastical Commission for £4,000 on 17 February 1887. The land stretched from Fairfield Road to Coombe Cliff and was connected to Reservoir (or Water Tower) Hill by a public right of way. A condition of the sale was that it should be preserved as a public recreation ground for ever, along with it being fenced and the construction of the road on its northern boundary. These stipulations meant that £2,000 had to be spent on the park, which also included turf, tree planting and tar-paved footpaths. The recreation ground was laid out by the Corporation’s road surveyor Mr. Powell, but work did not start until the end of the year when it was vacated by the tenant Mrs. Flower at Park Hill Farm, the site of today’s Park Hill Infant and Junior Schools. The recreation ground was officially opened on 11 July 1888. Forty seats were subsequently provided and a bandstand was donated by Councillor F T Edridge in 1889. As previously mentioned, the size of the recreation ground was increased with the addition of the Coombe Cliff grounds in 1930.

== Cotelands ==
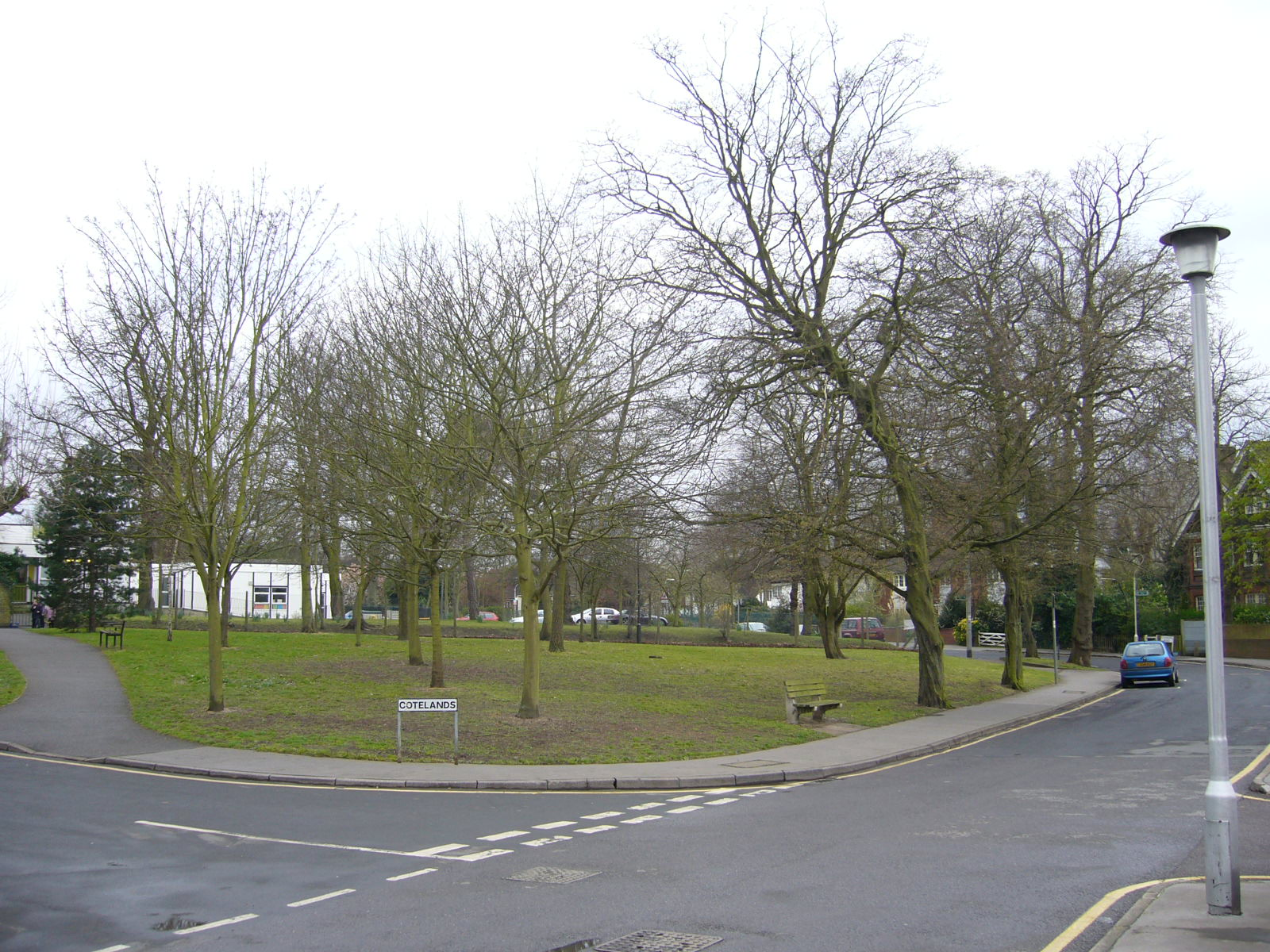
Cotelands

Cotelands is a small park near Park Hill, also managed by the London Borough of Croydon. It covers an area of 0.20 hectares. It is really just a green on the corner of Cotelands and The Avenue, next to Park Hill Junior School and near Archbishop Tenison's School.

== Gallery ==
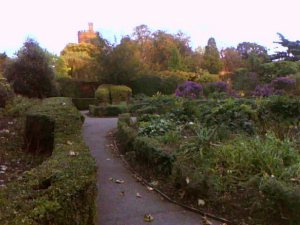
Part of the walled garden; water tower in the background

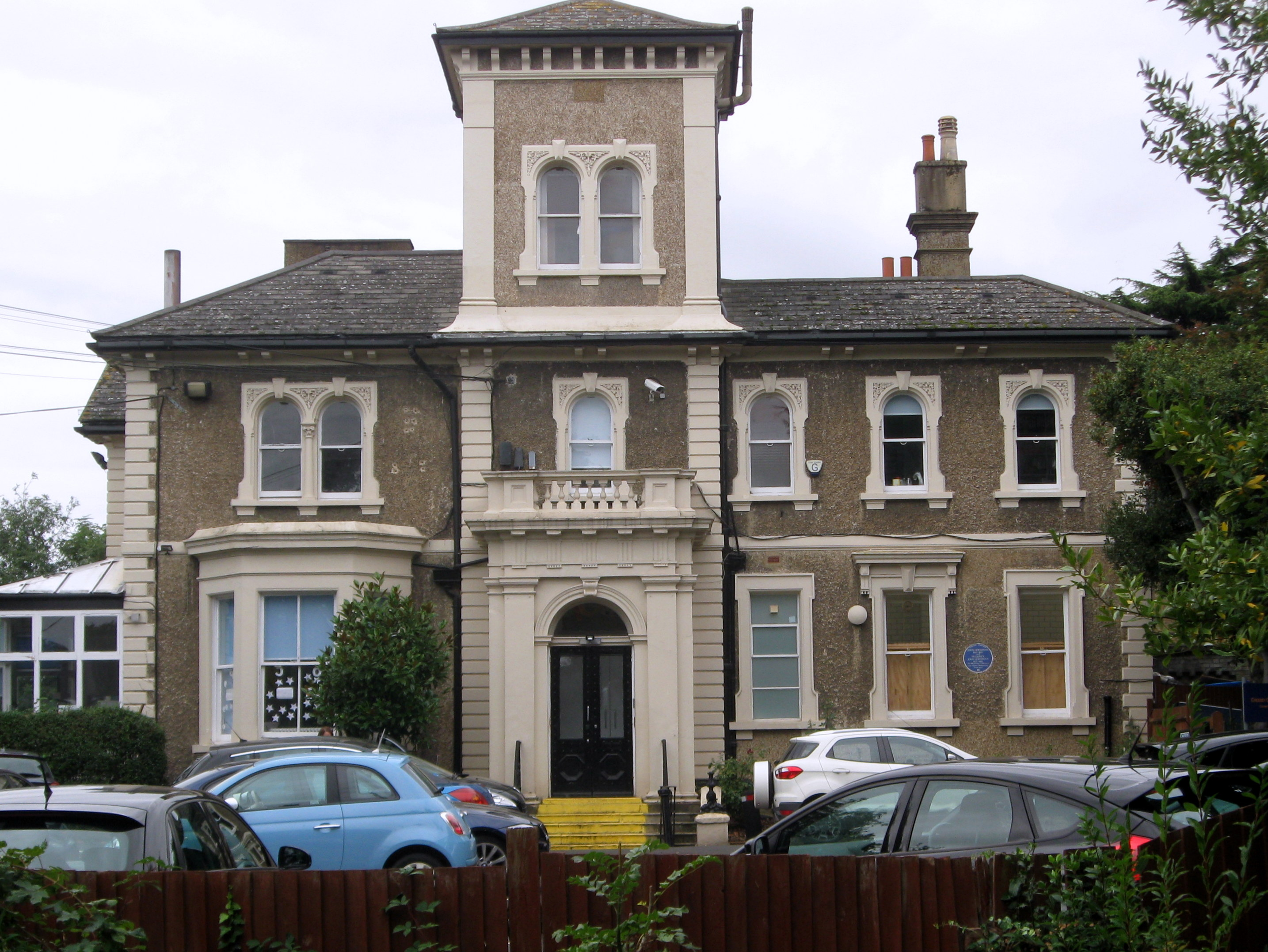
Coombe Cliff House

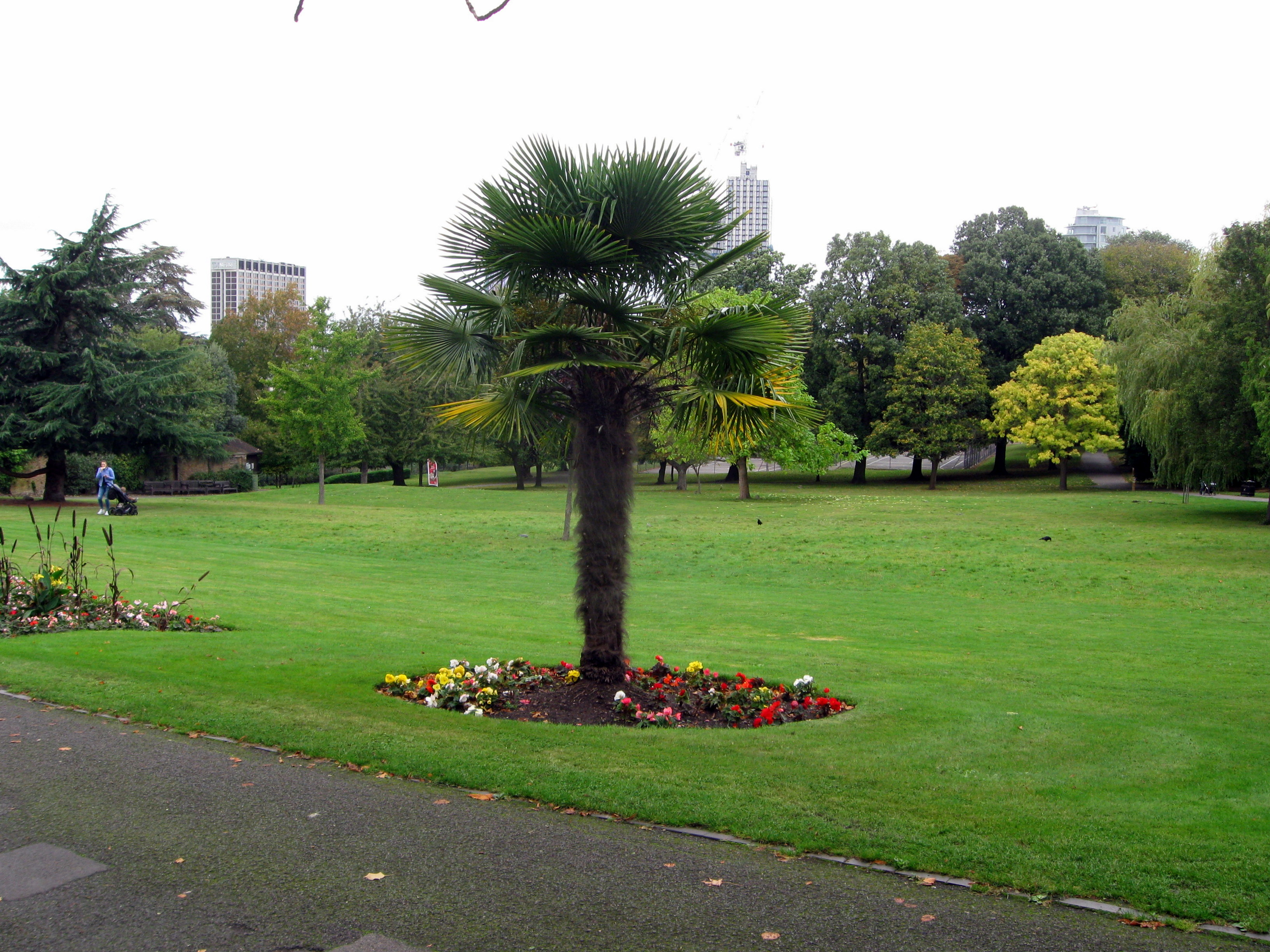
The upper part of the main park looking north from Coombe Cliff

== See also ==
- Park Hill Junior School
- List of parks and open spaces in Croydon
- Croydon parks and open spaces
- Addiscombe Recreation Ground
- Addiscombe Linear Park
