= Grangewood Park =

Park in the United Kingdom

Coordinates: 51.404°N 0.090°W

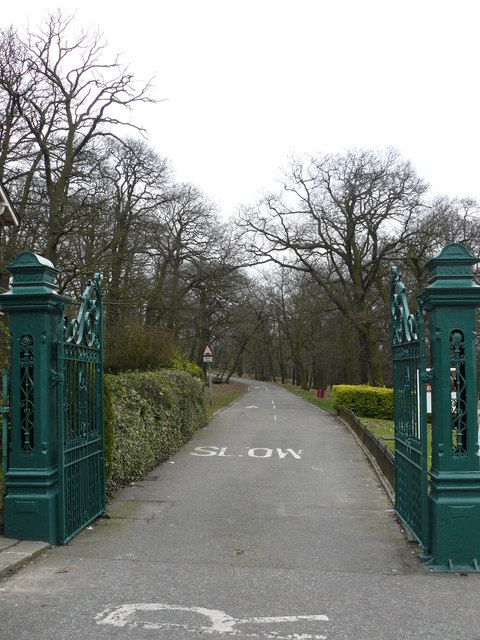
Park entrance

Grangewood Park is an extensive woodland area situated in South Norwood, London. It is managed by the London Borough of Croydon. It is bounded by Grange Road, Wharncliffe Road, and Ross Road. It covers an area of 27.7 acres (11.2 hectares). The park is located on the main A212 road (Grange Road) between Thornton Heath and Upper Norwood/Crystal Palace. The nearest stations are Thornton Heath, Selhurst and Norwood Junction.

== Facilities ==
Facilities include: Woodland, ornamental gardens, cultural garden, bowling green and pavilion, tennis courts, multi-games courts (football only), children's playground, and basketball and kick around facilities.

== History ==
Originally part of the Manor of Whitehorse, bought in 1787 by John Cator and enclosed in 1797, Grangewood was known as Whitehorse Wood and formed part of the Great North Wood (Norwood). It was 80 acres (32 hectares) in extent and was owned by Bishops of London between 1299 and 1338. It became known as White Horse in 1368 when the manor became owned by Walter Whitehors, who was shield-bearer to Edward III (previously it was known as Benchesham Manor).

When Cator died in 1806, the estate was inherited by his nephew, also John Cator, who sold it to a John Davidson Smith.

In 1800, the wood was surrounded by fields and the nearest dwellings were cottages clustered around the farmhouse. By 1847, a track had been constructed across the wood to connect Beulah Spa (laid out by Davidson Smith) with the road junction at White Horse Farm. This formed the line of Grange Road.

Davidson Smith divided the Whitehorse Estate into smaller plots and sold them for development. The east and west sides of Whitehorse Wood were cleared before 1850 and the remaining 30 acres (12 hectares) to the east of Grange Road were developed as a private estate.

An early edition of the 6" Ordnance Survey Map shows the layout of the private estate. The mansion was in the centre, with stables between it and the main entrance. To the east of the house, there was a nursery and Ross Lodge, and there was a second lodge at the entrance (Wharncliffe Lodge). Heath Lodge, which stands at the southern end of the park, is not shown on the map; it was built at a later date possibly when a second entrance was made at the junction of Grange Road and Ross Road.

The mansion had gardens that ran south from the house. Near Grange Road, there was a pond with a rustic bridge. The northern end remained woodland with trees on each side of the garden.

The Corporation of Croydon bought the Park for the public in 1900. The Council built a bowling green, tennis courts and a bandstand. Concerts were held during the summer but their popularity declined and the stand was subsequently demolished.

The mansion was a two-storey Victorian building with bay windows, a veranda and a conservatory on the south-east corner. Following purchase by the Corporation the mansion was used as a museum housing a collection of corals, shells and local Roman antiquities. One room was set aside as 'the Veterans' Club' where local pensioners could meet and socialise. Visitor refreshments were available from the tea-room in the house.

The Corporation used the nursery for plant production; in the autumn the greenhouses were open to the public. During the Second World War, it was given over to food production. After the war, it was partly demolished to make room for tennis courts, and in the mid-1960s it was closed when the Borough central nursery was opened.

The mansion was used during the First World War for billeting Canadian troops and in the Second World War both the house and grounds were badly damaged.

The mansion was demolished in 1960, having fallen into poor condition. The foundations were laid out as a formal garden with the bay windows as flower beds.

The park is still a popular area for its oak woodland, gardens, sports facilities and playground and in the spring the steep bank beside Grange Road provides a display of daffodils.

== See also ==
- List of Parks and Open Spaces in Croydon
