= Apsley Road Playground =

Public playground in South Norwood, UK

Coordinates: 51.3961°N 0.0674°W

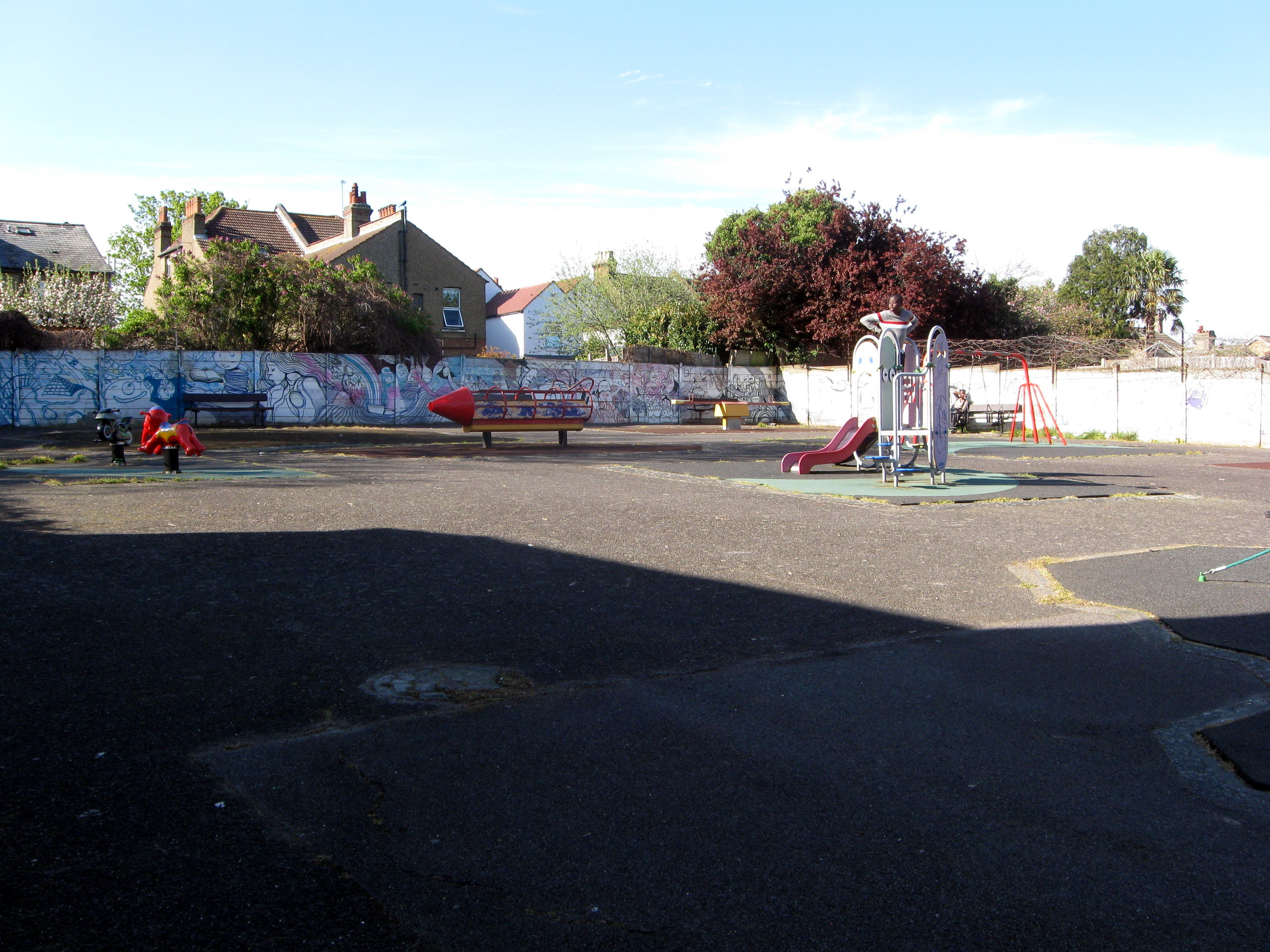
Apsley Road Playground in April 2021

Apsley Road Playground is a park and playground situated in South Norwood, London, England. It is managed by the London Borough of Croydon and covers an area of 0.25 acres (0.10 ha). The park is mainly located on Apsley Road which is also the main entrance for the park. It is more targeted to the surrounding residential area. The playground's nearest Tramlink stop is Harrington Road.

== Facilities ==
In the playground there is children's play equipment. At night the playground is locked.

== History ==
The site was purchased by the Borough of Croydon in 1946 to build a children's playground and was previously a property known as 15 Apsley Road.

The children's playground was created in 1951. An air raid shelter at the rear of 15 Apsley Road was removed in 1973.

== See also ==
- List of Parks and Open Spaces in Croydon
- South Norwood Country Park
- Croydon Sports Arena
