= Mitcham Common =

Common land in Mitcham, south London

Coordinates: 51°23′37″N 0°8′49″W

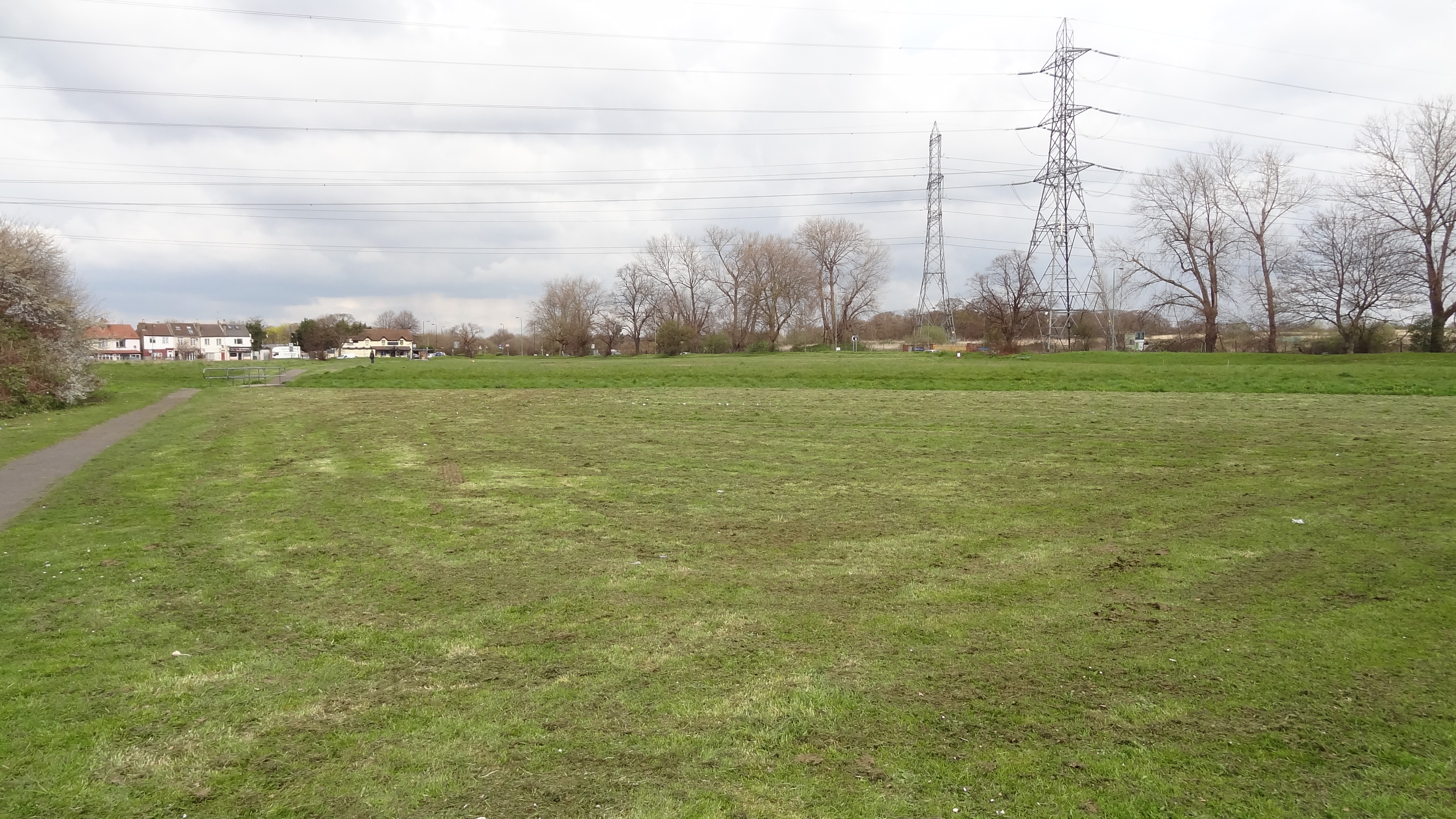
View of Mitcham Commons

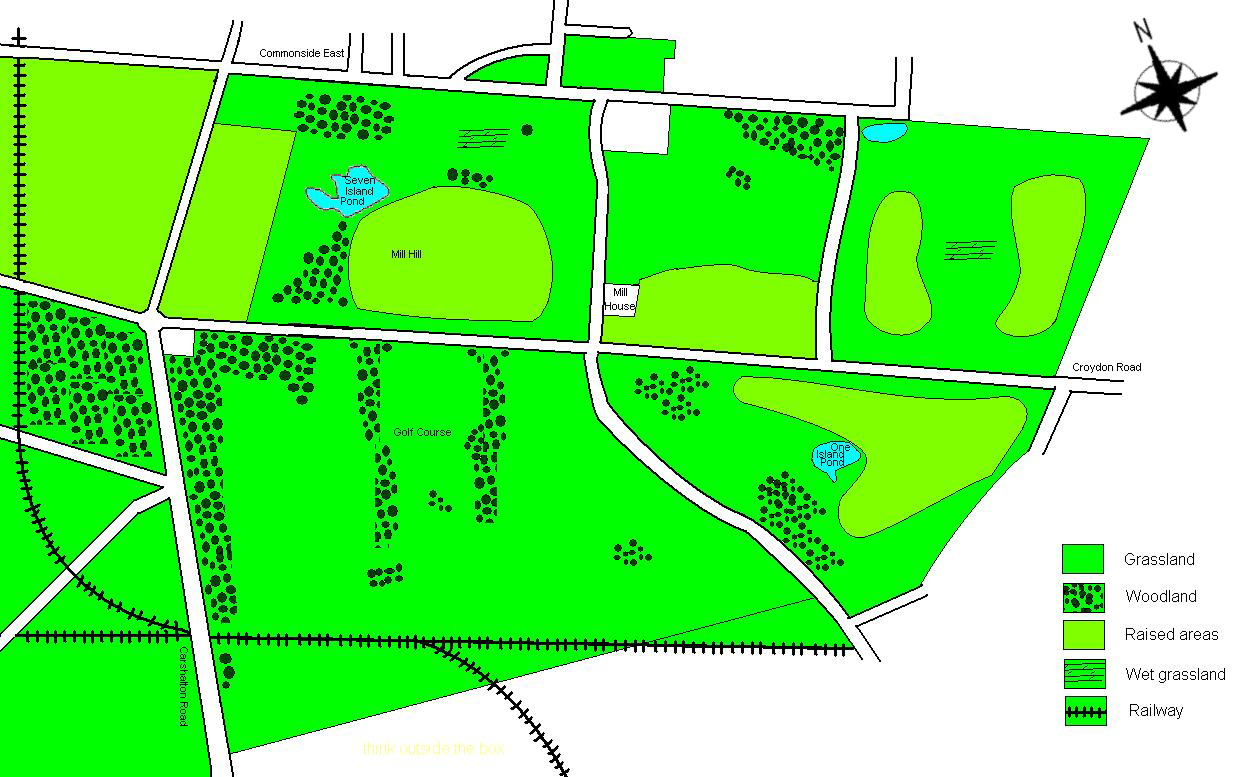
Map of Mitcham Common

Mitcham Common is 182 hectares (460 acres) of common land situated in south London. It is predominantly in the London borough of Merton, with parts straddling the borders of Croydon and Sutton. It is designated a Site of Metropolitan Importance for Nature Conservation.

== History ==
In feudal times, the poorest, least productive soil in a parish was designated as common land available for parishioners to graze animals and cut turf and timber for fuel. Members of this community with these rights were known as commoners. However, in the 19th century when material for road building became a valuable resource, the old grazing land was replaced by a series of pits for gravel extraction.

Metropolitan Commons (Mitcham) Supplemental Act 1891
- Act of Parliament
- Parliament of the United Kingdom
- Long title: An Act to confirm a Scheme under the Metropolitan Commons Act, 1866, and the Metropolitan Commons Amendment Act, 1869, relating to Mitcham Common, Upper Green, Lower Green, Figgs Marsh, and Beddington Corner.
- Citation: 54 & 55 Vict. c. xxvi

Dates
- Royal assent: 11 May 1891

Other legislation
- Relates to: Metropolitan Commons Act, 1866; Metropolitan Commons Amendment Act 1869

Text of statute as originally enacted

These works reached such a proportion that public opposition, led by George Parker Bidder QC, culminated in the protection of the common by a scheme under the Metropolitan Commons Act 1866, confirmed by the Metropolitan Commons (Mitcham) Supplemental Act 1891 (54 & 55 Vict. c. xxvi). The cost of its maintenance was split between the parish councils of Mitcham, Beddington and Wallington, and the council of the county borough of Croydon, according to the proportion of the common within each parish boundary.

Mitcham, now part of the London Borough of Merton bears the majority of the costs, with the remainder going to the London Boroughs of Croydon and Sutton. These funds support a warden and three assistants. Each council is represented by four nominated members of The Board, elected every two years.

== Geography and environment ==
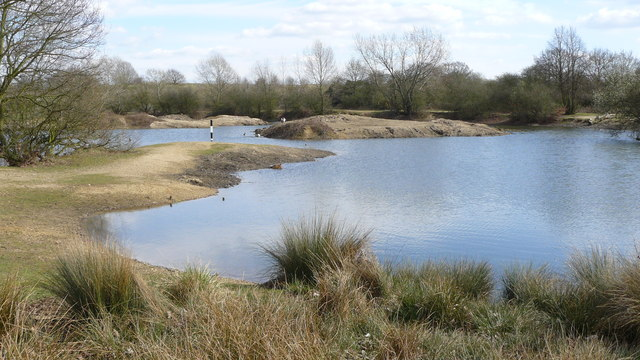
Seven Islands Pond, on Mitcham Common

The course of the Thames has gradually altered, exposing gravels that were initially colonised by grasses and other Flowering Plants. Over time, woody species slowly overwhelmed these early colonisers, developing a loose scrubby vegetation that became denser until woodland had developed. Early humans were responsible for clearing trees and suppressing their regeneration by grazing cattle and cutting turf and timber for fuel.

In the late 19th Century these practices ceased and woodland was allowed to regenerate. This process allowed a succession from grassland, through a series of intermediate stages, to woodland.

The river gravels are well drained and strongly acidic, leading to a hostile environment in which plants have to withstand occasional drought and nutrient deficiency. However, considerable areas have acquired foreign soils during landfill programmes, whilst ploughing for agriculture during World War II and numerous pipe laying programmes have brought trapped nutrients to the surface. The result is a patchwork of soil types, each providing different plant and animal habitats. As the grassland reverts to woodland, the various stages in this process create further habitats.

The Seven Islands pond is the largest of the ponds on the common, and was created as the result of gravel extraction during the 19th century. The most recent pond to be created, Bidder's pond, was created in 1990 and named for George Parker Bidder.

== Buildings ==
There are a few buildings on the common. The buildings comprising the Windmill Trading Estate have existed in one form or another since 1782, when the estate was established as workhouses for the poor. Companies to have utilised the buildings include Hooper's Telegraph Works. Recently the Estate has been replaced by a mixed-tenure of housing apartments. The Mill House Ecology Centre and the Harvester (formerly the Mill House Pub) are located near the site of an old windmill, the remnants of which still exist. There also exists upon the common a carved granite stone in commemoration of George Parker Bidder.

== See also ==
- List of parks and open spaces in the London Borough of Croydon
