= Addiscombe Recreation Ground =

Park in Addiscombe, London, England

Coordinates: 51°22′39″N 0°04′14″W

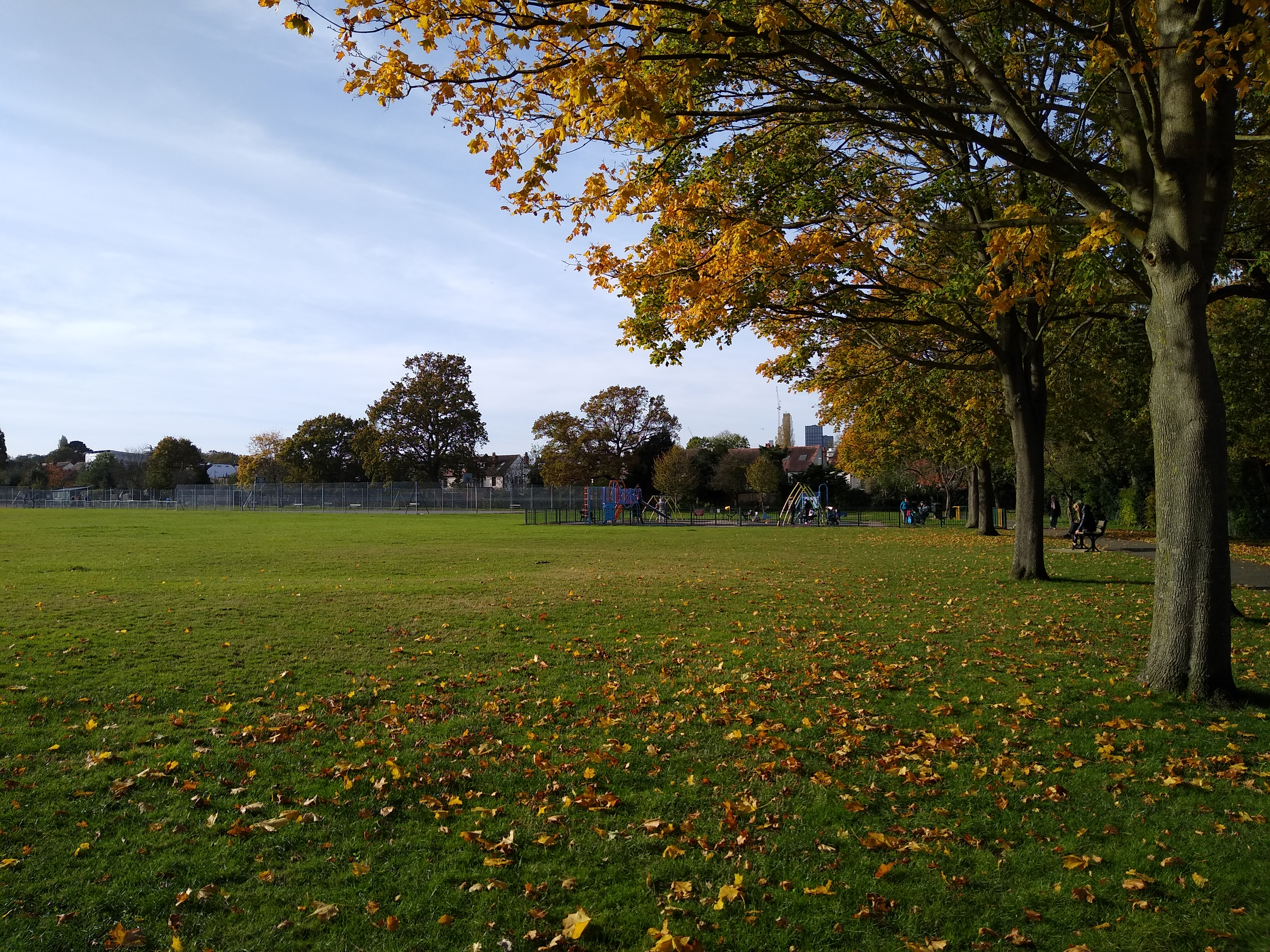
Addiscombe Recreation Ground

Addiscombe Recreation Ground, commonly known as Bingham Park, is a park situated in Addiscombe, London. The park is managed by London Borough of Croydon. Addiscombe tram stop is located just next to the recreation ground and is served by Tramlink. The area covers 8 acres (3.2 ha).

== Facilities ==
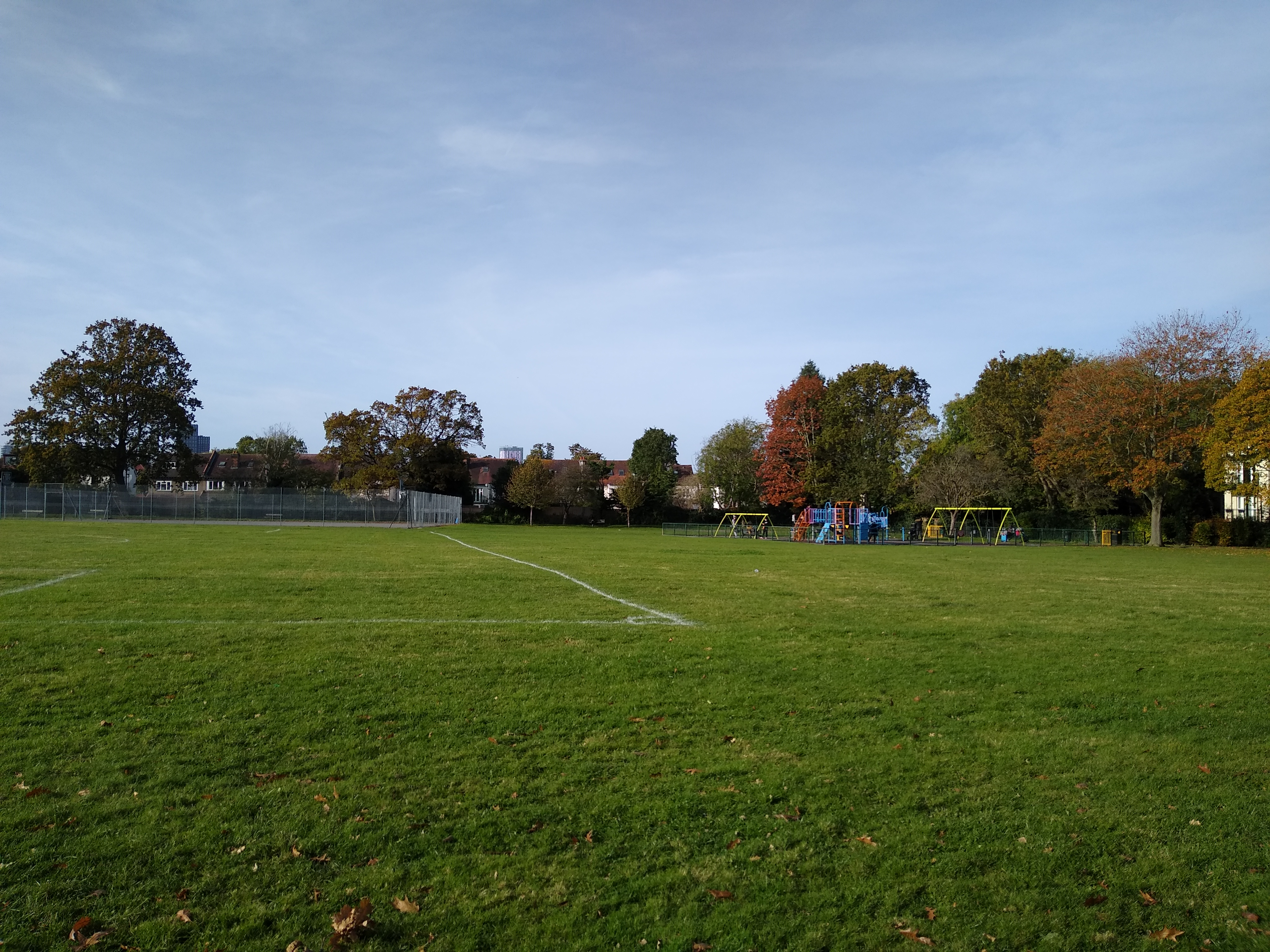
A basketball court (left) and a playground (right) in Addiscombe Recreation Ground

- Children's playground
- Toilets
- Football pitches
- Tennis courts
- Basketball court
- Grass areas and flower beds.
- The ground is locked at night.

== History ==
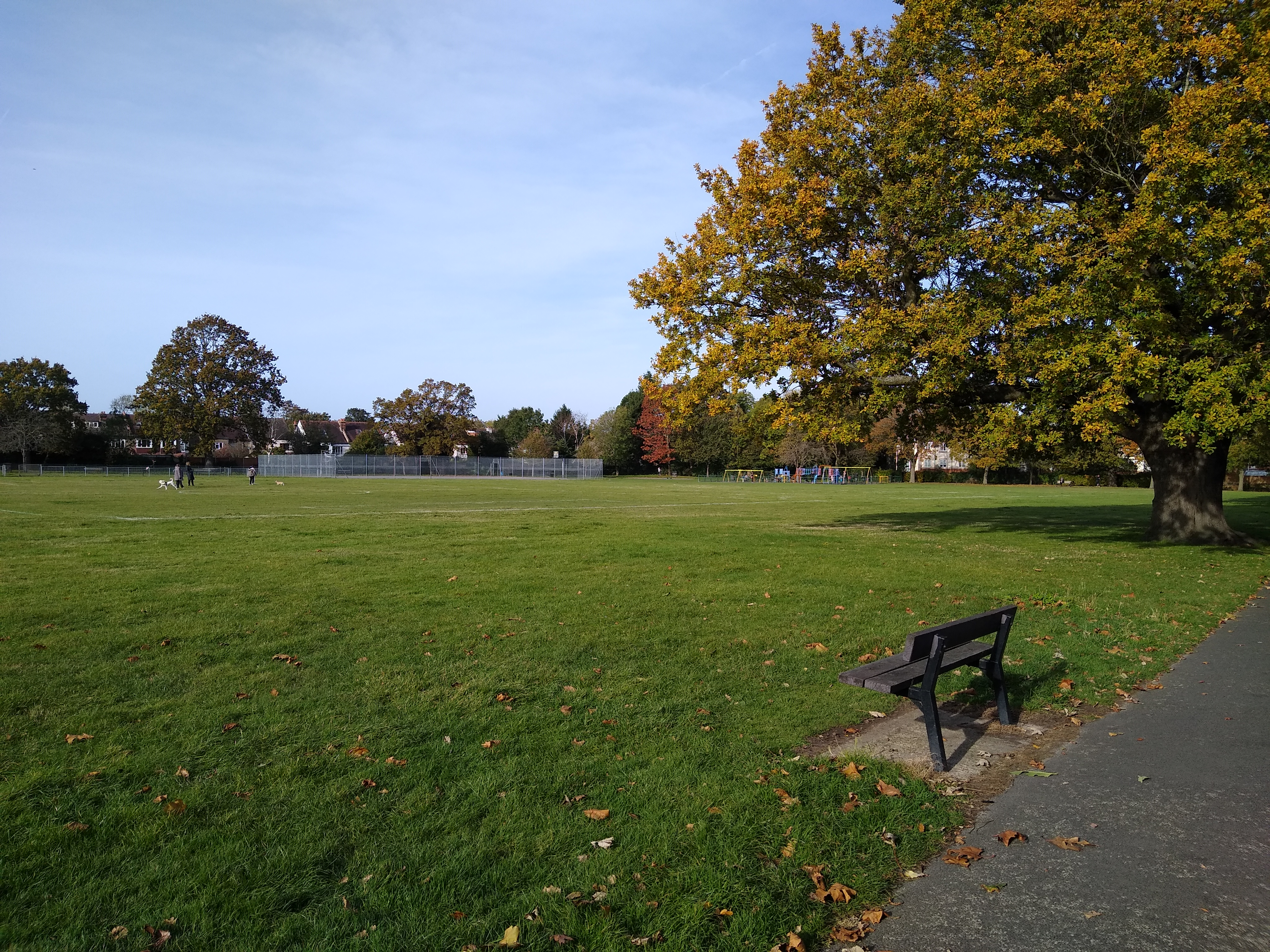
Addiscombe Recreation Ground

The park is within a residential area and can only be reached by foot. The area was acquired in 1905 and laid out in 1911. It had previously been farmland but expansion of Croydon in the early 20th-century meant that it was needed for residential purposes. The land was once part of the Ashburton Estate owned by the Baring family.

== See also ==
- List of Parks and Open Spaces in Croydon
- Addiscombe Linear Park
