= Addington Vale =

Park in London Borough of Croydon

Coordinates: 51.343°N 0.011°W

Addington Vale is a 48 acres (19 ha) park situated in New Addington in the London Borough of Croydon. The park extends from King Henrys Drive in the north to Arnhem Drive in the south. It is bordered by Queen Elizabeths Drive to the west and Godric Crescent and Hares Bank to the east. The nearest Tramlink station is New Addington.

== Facilities ==
- Two children's playgrounds
- Car park
- Multi-games court
- Children's designated cycle area

== History ==
The land which subsequently formed Addington Vale was purchased through use of the 1936 Housing Act and in 1957 was declared Green Belt. It was appropriated as an open public space in 1963. Between then and 1970, the area was levelled by the use of landfill and topsoil added. The area was then planted and footpaths constructed, together with children's playgrounds and sports pitches.

== See also ==
- List of Parks and Open Spaces in Croydon
- Addington Park
- Addington Hills
