= South Norwood Lake and Grounds =

Park in South Norwood, London, England

Coordinates: 51.407°N 0.074°W

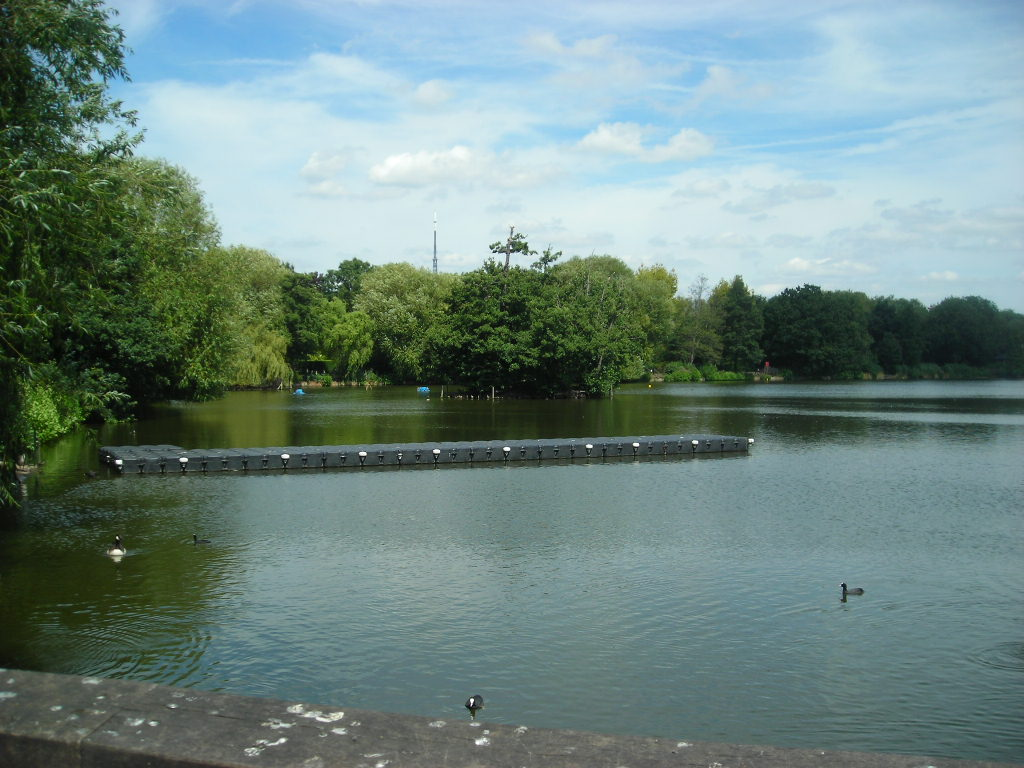
- South Norwood Lake
- Interactive map of South Norwood Lake and Grounds
- Type: Public park
- Location: South Norwood
- Operator: London Borough of Croydon
- Status: Open all year
- Public transit: 410 bus to Harris City Academy stop

South Norwood Lake and Grounds is a park in South Norwood in the London Borough of Croydon. The main entrance is in Woodvale Avenue while other entrances are located in Auckland Road and Sylvan Road. The area measures up to 28 1/2 acres (11.53 hectares).

As well as the lake, there is a bowling green, tennis and basketball courts, football pitches, a cricket pitch, a playground and a trim trail. The park has active park rangers and has a park ranger's office with adjoining public toilets.

The lake was originally created as a reservoir for the Croydon Canal, which, from 1809 to 1836, ran between Croydon and the Grand Surrey Canal at New Cross. As of May 2019, it is used by local anglers, who fish for carp, bream and perch among others, and Croydon Sailing Club. The lake is also home to a variety of aquatic birds including a number of great crested grebes as well as regularly sighted herons and ring-necked parakeets that can be seen nesting on the island.

In 2004, blue green algae resulted in the death of significant numbers of fish, and the predominant species left were carp and perch. The lake itself has natural food sources for fish including a blood worm bar.

== Norwood Sports Club ==
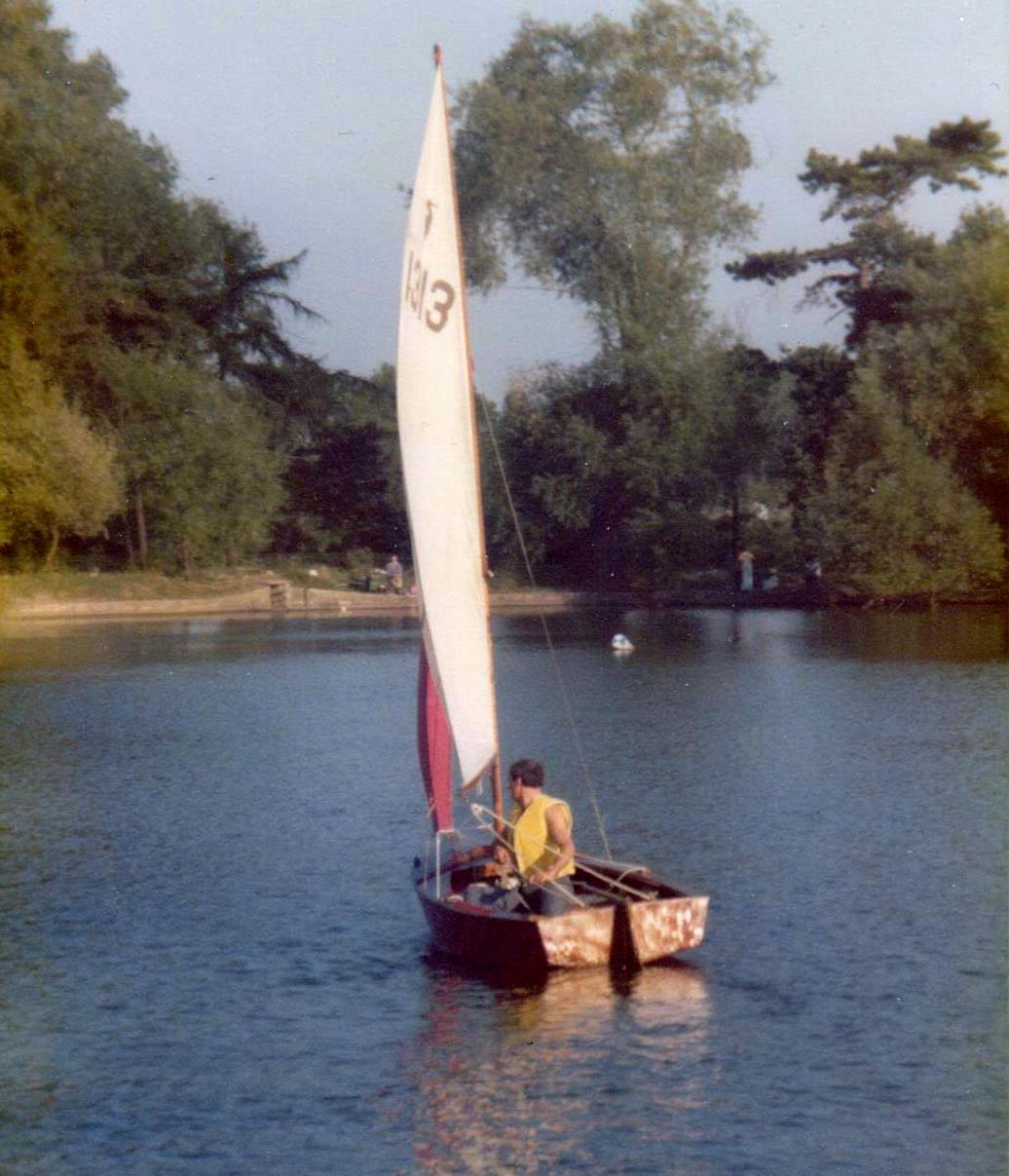
Dinghy sailing on Norwood Lake

The grounds are also home to the Norwood Sports Club. Founded in 1881 by Alfred Steer, the club leased 16 acres which included the lake and in 1888 a further 37 acres were leased from the Ecclesiastical Commissioners. At that point the club was the largest tennis club in the world with 54 courts. Facilities then included bowls, tennis, cricket and golf as well as the lake. The golf course was requisitioned during World War I and was damaged and fell into disuse thereafter. The grounds were used by British Dominion Insurance as a staff sports ground from 1920, before the original 16 acres were purchased by Croydon Council in 1931. The additional 37 acres were firstly leased in 1933 and subsequently purchased in 1936, by the council. The sports club leased most of the land until 1947 when 33.5 acres were relinquished. The grounds were opened fully to the public in 1969 but the club still retains some user rights.

== See also ==
- List of Parks and Open Spaces in Croydon
- Croydon Council
- South Norwood
- London Buses route 410
