= Foxley Wood, Purley =

Nature reserve in Purley, London, England

Coordinates: 51.328°N 0.114°W

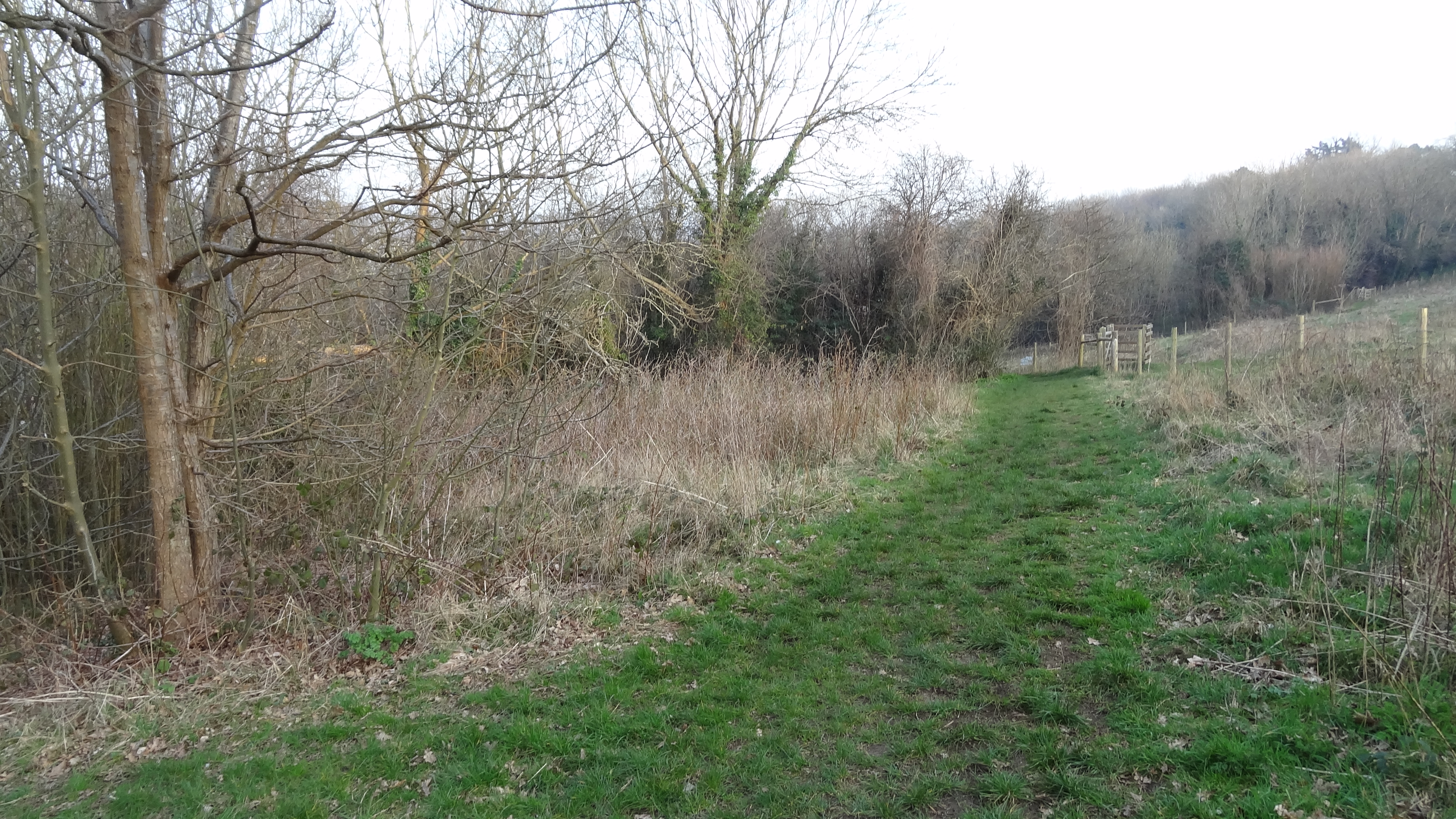

Foxley Wood is an 11.36 hectare Local Nature Reserve and Site of Borough Importance for Nature Conservation, Grade 1, in Purley in the London Borough of Croydon. It is owned and managed by Croydon Council. The site was purchased by Coulsdon and Purley Urban District Council under the Green Belt Act in the 1930s.

Some of the woodland on the site is ancient, and there are also areas of chalk grassland. The wood is principally oak and ash, with some sycamore and wild cherry. There is an understorey of hazel. Flora include dog's mercury, wood millet, wood melick. The site also has a wide variety of insects, including grasshoppers and butterflies. Forty-five species of birds have been recorded, and there are also badgers and roe deer.

There is access from Burwood Avenue, Northwood Avenue, Woodland Way and Higher Drive.
