= Addiscombe =

Area of south London, England

Coordinates: 51.381°N 0.0663°W

- Suburb
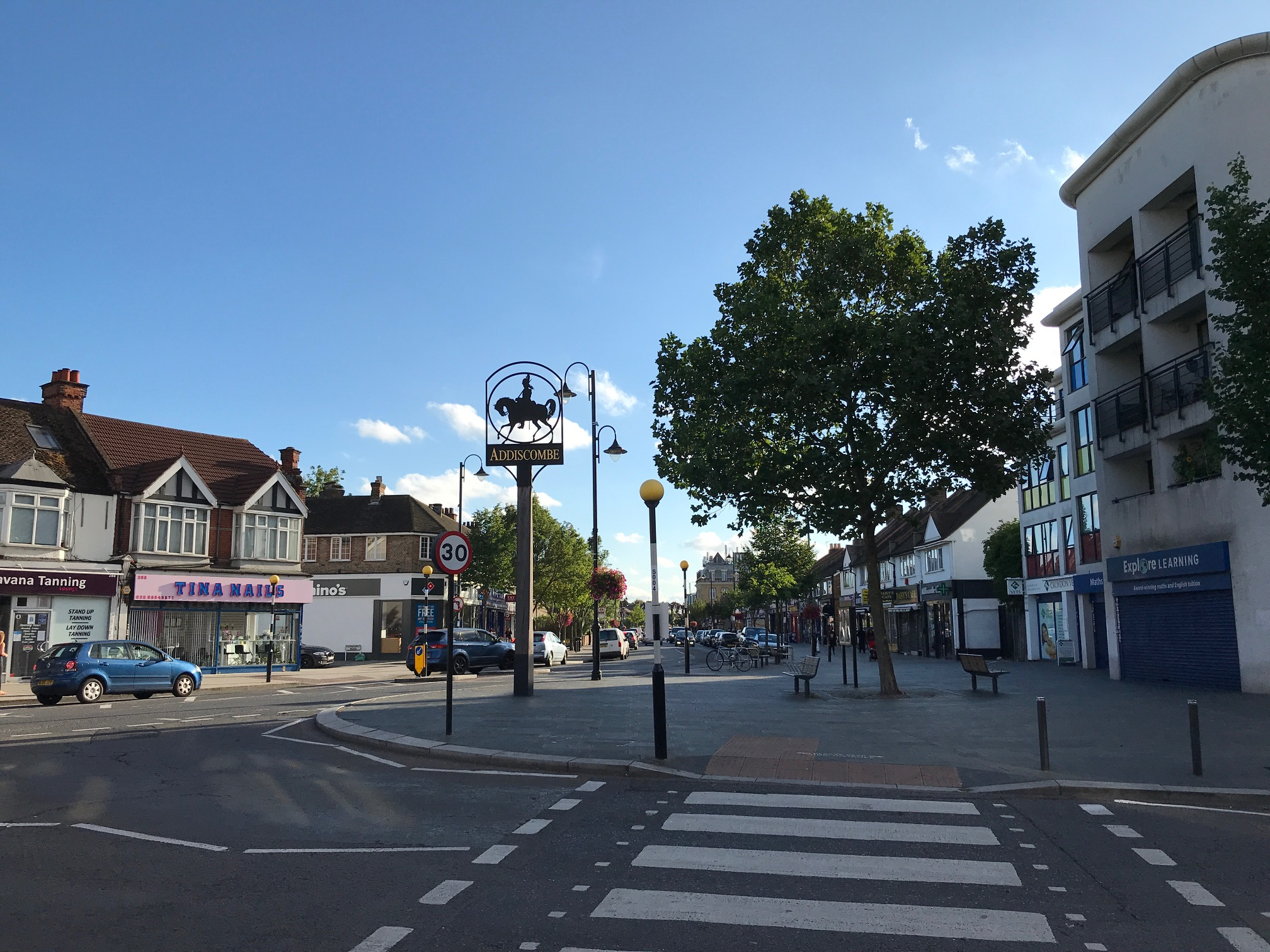
- Village sign and shops on Lower Addiscombe Road

- Location within Greater London
- OS grid reference: TQ345665
  - Charing Cross: 9.1 mi (14.6 km) NNW
- London borough: Croydon
- Ceremonial county: Greater London
- Region: London
- Country: England
- Sovereign state: United Kingdom
- Post town: CROYDON
- Postcode district: CR0
- Dialling code: 020
- Police: Metropolitan
- Fire: London
- Ambulance: London
- UK Parliament: Croydon East
- London Assembly: Croydon and Sutton

Addiscombe /ˈædɪskəm/ is an area of south London, England, within the London Borough of Croydon. It is located 9.1 miles (15 km) south of Charing Cross, and is situated north of Coombe and Selsdon, east of Croydon town centre, south of Woodside, and west of Shirley.

== Etymology ==
Addiscombe as a place name is thought to be Anglo-Saxon in origin, meaning "Eadda or Æddi's estate", from an Anglo-Saxon personal name, and the word camp, meaning an enclosed area in Old English. The same Anglo-Saxon land-owner may have given his name to Addington, around two miles to the south.

== History ==
First mentioned in the 13th century, Addiscombe formed part of Croydon Manor, and was known as enclosed land belonging to Eadda. The area was a rural and heavily wooded area for much of its history. Its main industries were farming and brick-making, clay deposits at Woodside providing the raw materials for the latter.

During the Tudor period, Addiscombe was a large country estate and the seat of the Heron family. Sir Nicholas Heron died there in 1568 and was interred at his family's chapel at Croydon Minster.

The estate passed through several owners until 1650 when it was sold to Sir Purbeck Temple, a member of the Privy Council in the time of Charles II. After the death of Sir Purbeck in 1695 and his wife Dame Sarah Temple in 1700, the estate passed to Dame Sarah's nephew, William Draper, who was married to the daughter of the famous diarist, John Evelyn. When Draper died in 1718, he left his estate to his son of the same name and it then passed to his nephew, Charles Clark.

=== Addiscombe Place ===
In 1703, Addiscombe Place was built for William Draper to Sir John Vanbrugh's design. The house was built on a site which is now the corner of Outram Road and Mulberry Lane and became known as one of three great houses in Addiscombe, the others being 'Ashburton House' and 'Stroud Green House'. It replaced the Elizabethan mansion built by Thomas Heron in 1516. John Tunstall, a courtier of Anne of Denmark, bought Heron's house and had a noted flower garden.

John Evelyn recorded in his Diary, "I went to Adscomb on 11 July 1703 to see my son-in-law’s new house. It has excellent brickwork and Portland stone features, that I pronounced it good solid architecture, and one of the very best gentlemen's houses in Surrey." Distinguished guests who stayed at the mansion include George III, William Pitt the Elder and Peter the Great of Russia. Peter the Great was reputed to have planted a cedar tree in Mulberry Lane to record his visit.

During the 18th century Addiscombe Place was successively the home to The Lord Talbot, The Lord Grantham and lastly The Earl of Liverpool, who died there in 1808.

=== Addiscombe Military Seminary ===
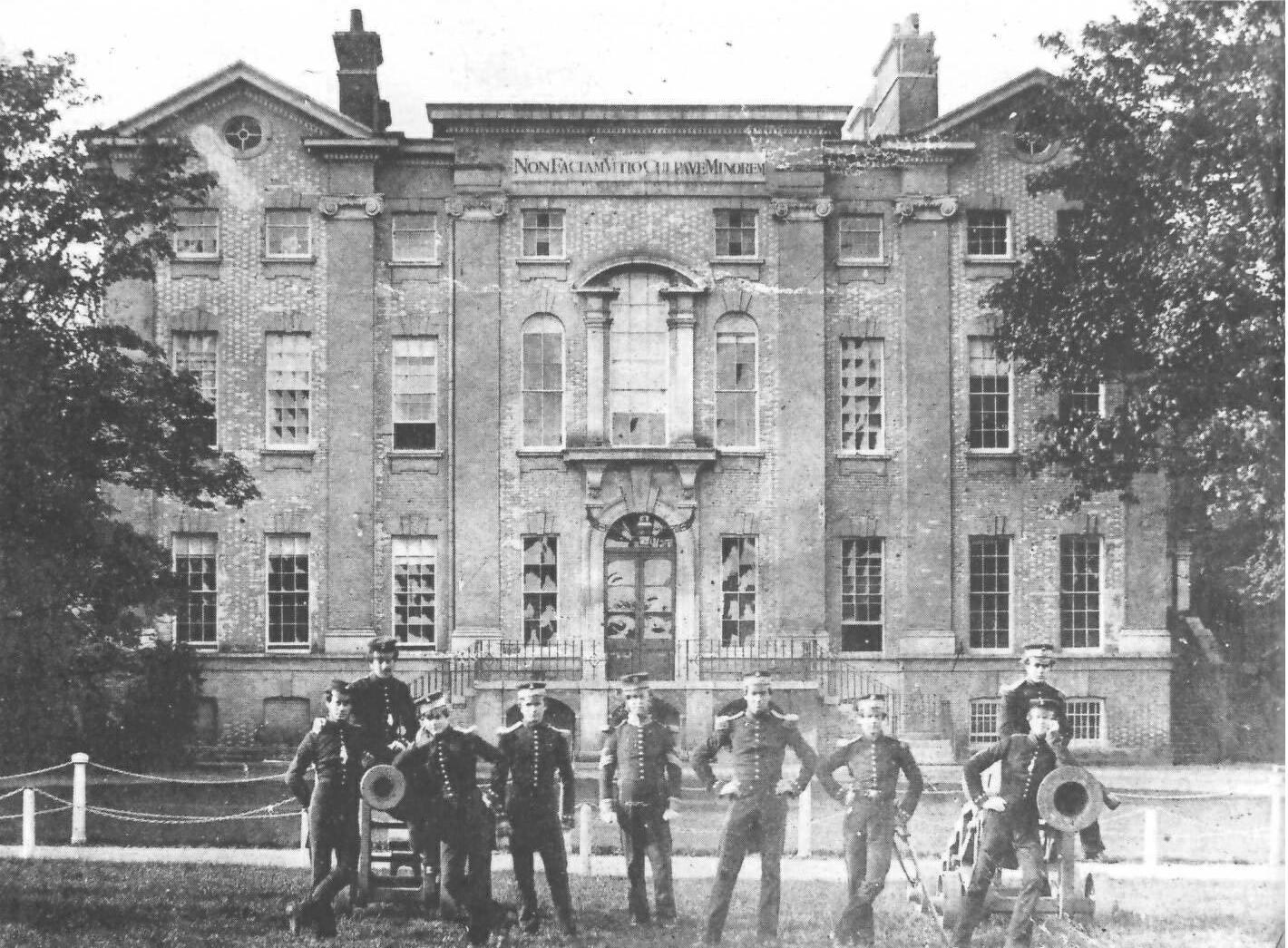
Addiscombe Military Seminary, photographed c.1859, with cadets in the foreground

In 1809, Emelius Ratcliffe sold Addiscombe Place to the British East India Company for £15,500, whereupon it became a military academy known as the Addiscombe Military Seminary. Cadets were trained as officers for one of the Company's three Presidency Armies. Its counterpart, East India Company College in Hertfordshire, trained the Company's administrators. The Indian Mutiny of 1857 led to strong criticism of the Company, and in 1858 it was nationalised by the British government. The military seminary was closed in 1861 and the remaining cadets transferred to the Royal Military College, Sandhurst.

In 1863, the seminary buildings were sold for £33,600 to developers who razed most of them to the ground. Five parallel roads were laid out on the site, to the south of the former college site – Outram, Havelock, Elgin, Clyde and Canning Roads. They were all named after individuals who were prominent in either the military or civil governance of British India namely; Sir James Outram, Bt, Sir Henry Havelock, The Earl of Elgin, The Lord Clyde and The Earl Canning. All that survives of the Seminary itself are two buildings called 'Ashleigh' and 'India', on the corner of Clyde Road and Addiscombe Road, and a former gymnasium on Havelock Road, now private apartments.

=== Suburban growth ===
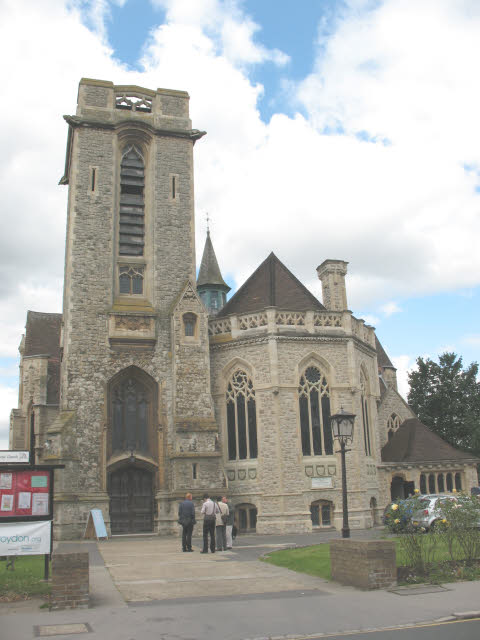
St Mary Magdalene Church, Addiscombe.

With the advent of the railways in the 1830s, Cherry Orchard Road linking Addiscombe with Croydon ceased to be a quiet rural lane and railway workers' cottages sprang up, many with the still-visible date of 1838. However it was not until 1858 and the sale of the college, that significant urbanisation occurred.

There was formerly a small chapel attached to Addiscombe Military Seminary and to this, cadets paraded each morning and evening for a service conducted by the chaplain. On Sundays, cadets went down to the Parish Church in Croydon. By 1827, it became clear that Croydon Parish Church was too far away to minister to the college needs and St James' Parish Church was built and consecrated on 31 January 1829. The population of Addiscombe at this time was about 1,000. In 1870, the church of St Paul's (built by Edward Buckton Lamb) was opened and then rededicated in 1874 to St Mary Magdalene. The parish of Addiscombe was formed in 1879.

In the 1890s, the Ashburton Estate was gradually sold for redevelopment, and Ashburton House, which had previously hosted literary figures such as Alfred, Lord Tennyson, Thomas Carlyle and Henry Wadsworth Longfellow, was demolished in 1910.

=== Modern Addiscombe ===
Much of the land remaining in the area after the initial Victorian-era had been infilled with smaller housing developments by the 1930s. Addiscombe railway station closed in the late 1990s and was replaced by housing. Since early 2006 several parts of Addiscombe have been in the process of extensive regeneration, notably the addition of housing to the site of the former Black Horse Pub and the demolition of former Church Halls and a small garden centre in Bingham Road allowing a new Church Hall and community complex to be built and providing luxury retirement apartments on adjoining land.

The area contains a number of parks and green spaces, notably Ashburton Park and Addiscombe Recreation Ground. The main shopping area is situated along Lower Addiscombe Road, containing a variety of shops, restaurants and pubs.

== Sport ==
- Addiscombe Hockey Club, Field Hockey Club based in Addiscombe
- Addiscombe Cricket Club est. 1866
- Addiscombe Cycling Club est. 1929

== Transport ==
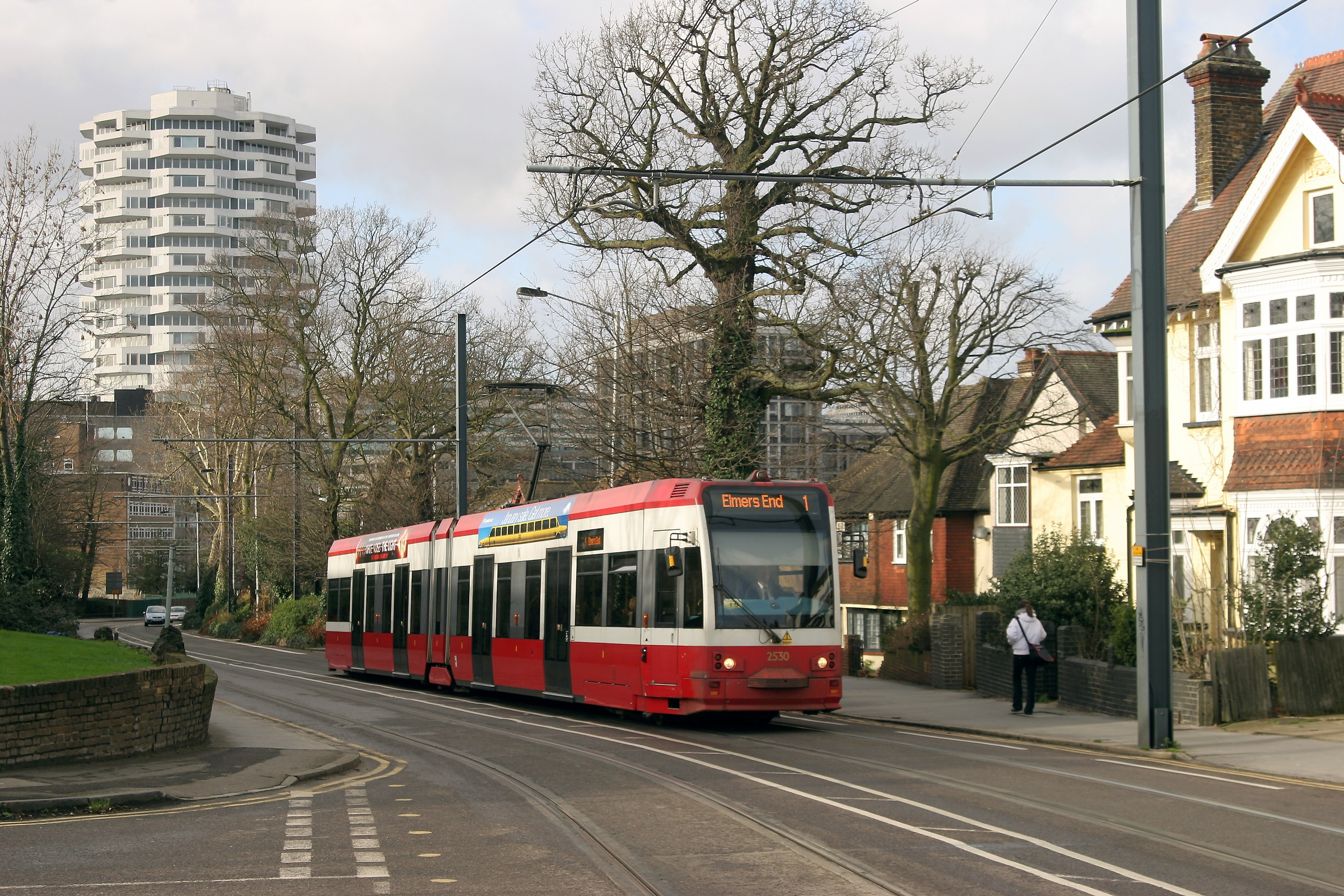
Tram on Addiscombe Road

=== Tram ===
The area is currently served by four Tramlink stations - Lebanon Road, Sandilands, Addiscombe and Blackhorse Lane. Sandilands was the site of a serious derailment in 2016 which resulted in seven deaths.

=== Rail ===
Addiscombe railway station, located around 500 metres west of Addiscombe's main shopping parade, closed in 1997 following the withdrawal of services from Elmers End.The station building was later demolished and replaced by housing (as East India Way). Part of the trackbed between Woodside and Addiscombe railway stations is now Addiscombe Railway Park. Bingham Road station also formerly served the area; it was located roughly where Addiscombe tram stop now is, before closing in 1983. The former rail station featured in the opening scenes of the 1961 Tony Hancock film The Rebel. The nearest railway station is now East Croydon.

=== Bus ===
Buses in Addiscombe are run by Transport for London. 4 bus routes serve the area. The first being the 289 to Elmers End or Purley. The second being the 312 to Norwood Junction or Kenley. Thirdly the 367 to Croydon or Bromley.

== Notable people ==
- Frederick George Creed (1871-1957), electrical engineer and an inventor of the teleprinter, who lived at 20 Outram Road where an English Heritage Blue Plaque commemorates him.
- R. F. Delderfield (1912–1972), writer & dramatist lived at 22 Ashburton Avenue, Addiscombe from 1918 to 1923 (commemorated with a plaque). His "Avenue" series is based on his life in Addiscombe & Shirley Park, and many of his works were adapted for television.
- Matthew Fisher, organist of Procol Harum, was born in Addiscombe.
- D. H. Lawrence (1885–1930), author, lived at 12 Colworth Road, Addiscombe from 1908 to 1912 whilst teaching at Davidson Road School; the house commemorates him with a plaque.
- Kate Moss, model, grew up in Addiscombe.
- Paul Nihill, Olympic medallist who won a silver medal at the 1964 Tokyo Olympics for the 50 km walk; Nihill Place is named for him.
- Adam Pearson, British actor.
- David Prowse (1 July 1935 – 28 November 2020) actor who played Darth Vader lived in Addiscombe.
- William Harris Rule (1802–1890), British Methodist missionary and writer, died in Addiscombe.
- Betty Westgate MBE (1919 – 2000), founder of Breast Cancer Care, lived at 1 Colworth Road (commemorated with a plaque).

== Gallery ==
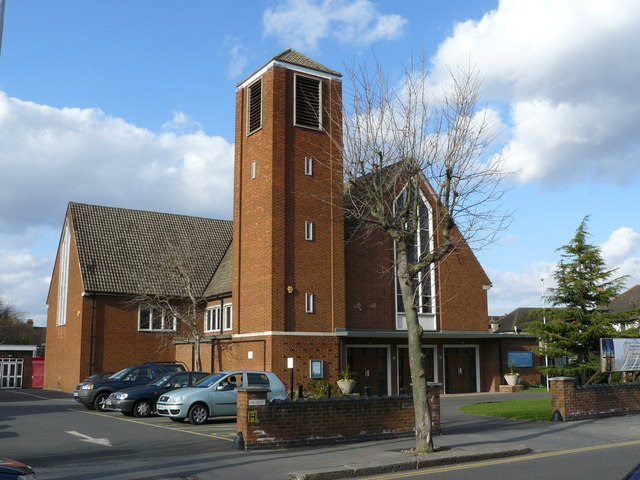
Our Lady of the Annunciation RC Church, Bingham Road, Addiscombe

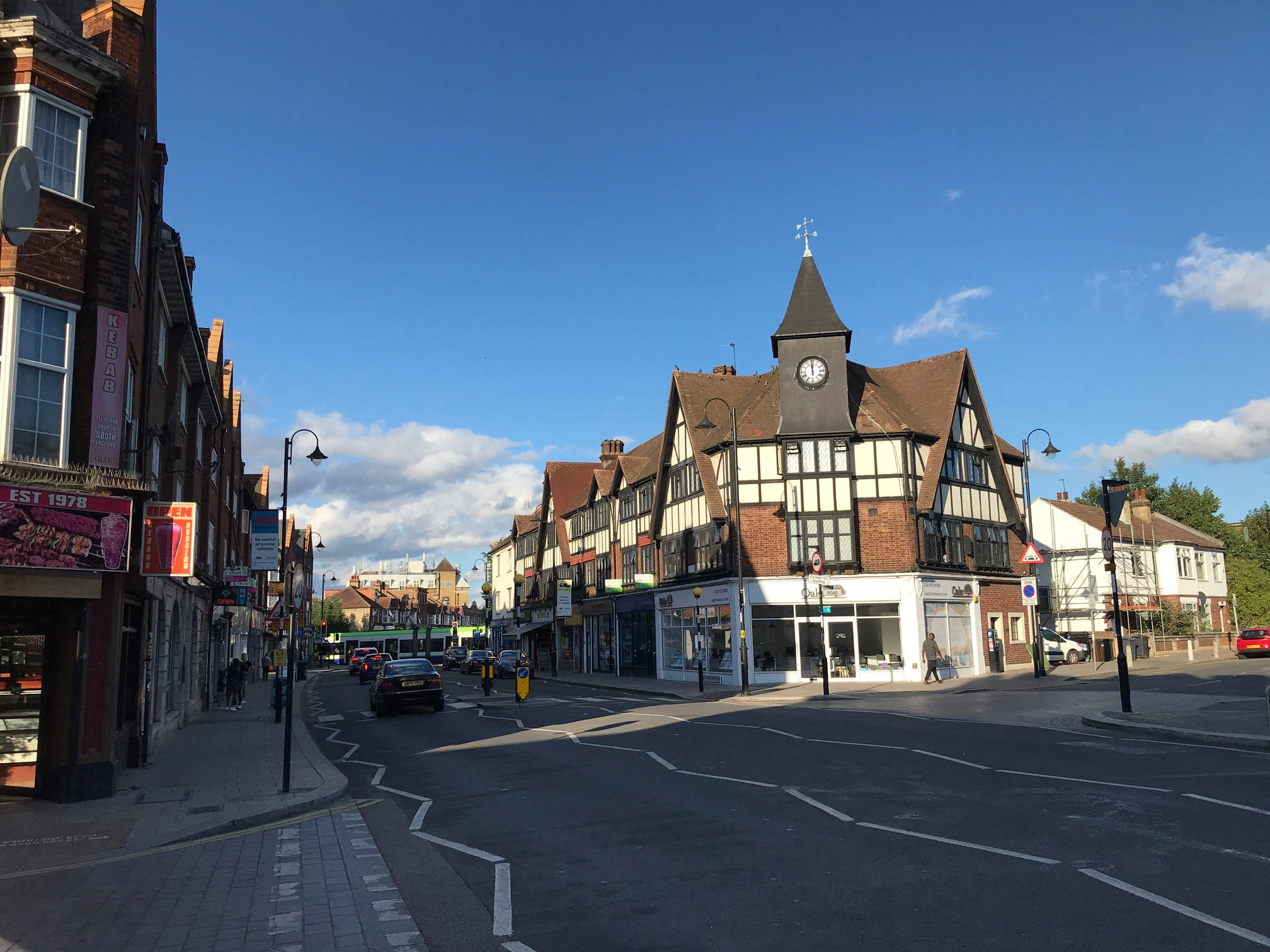
Lower Addiscombe Road shopping parade, looking east from the tram stop

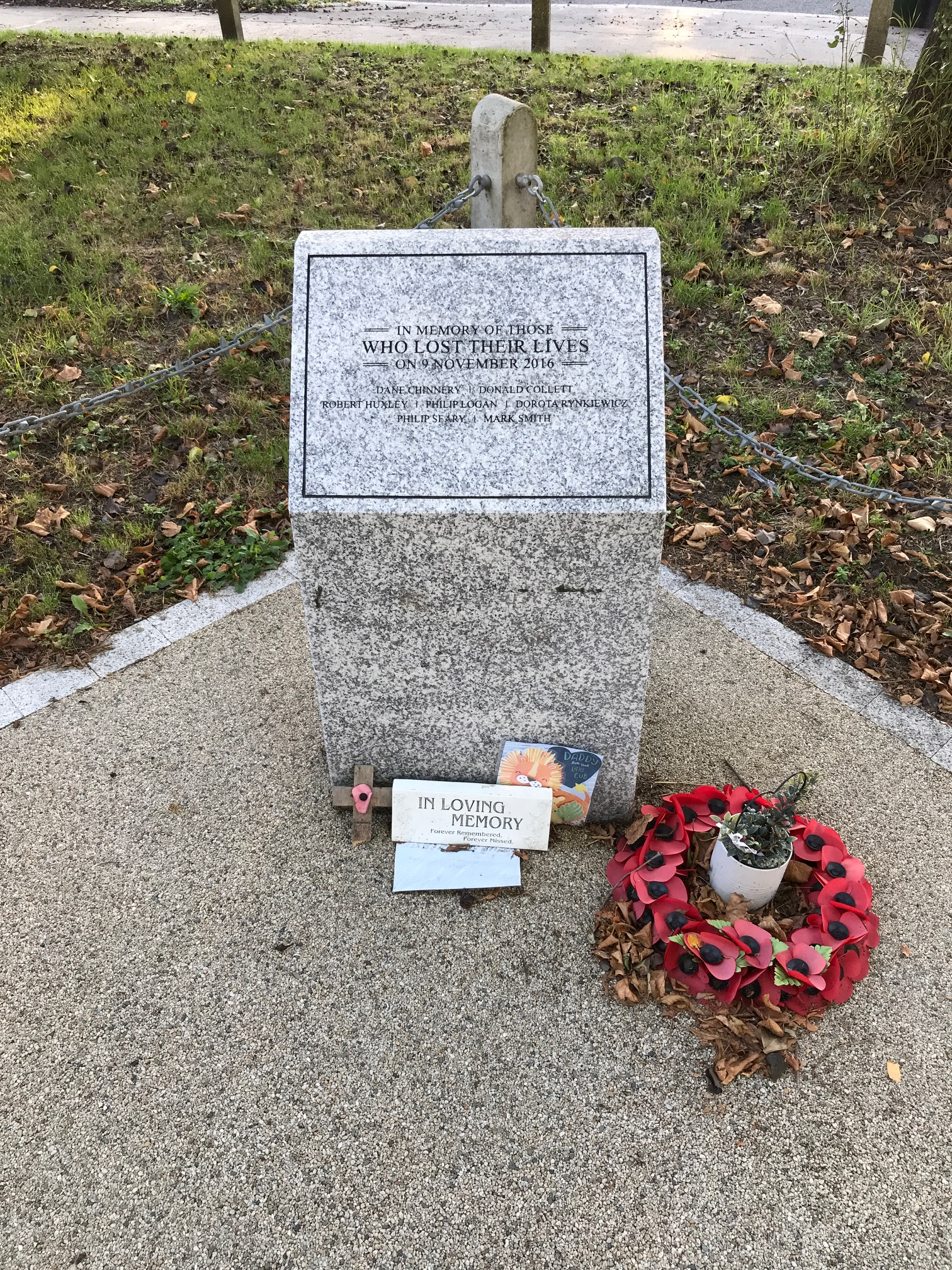
Memorial to the victims of the Sandilands tram crash

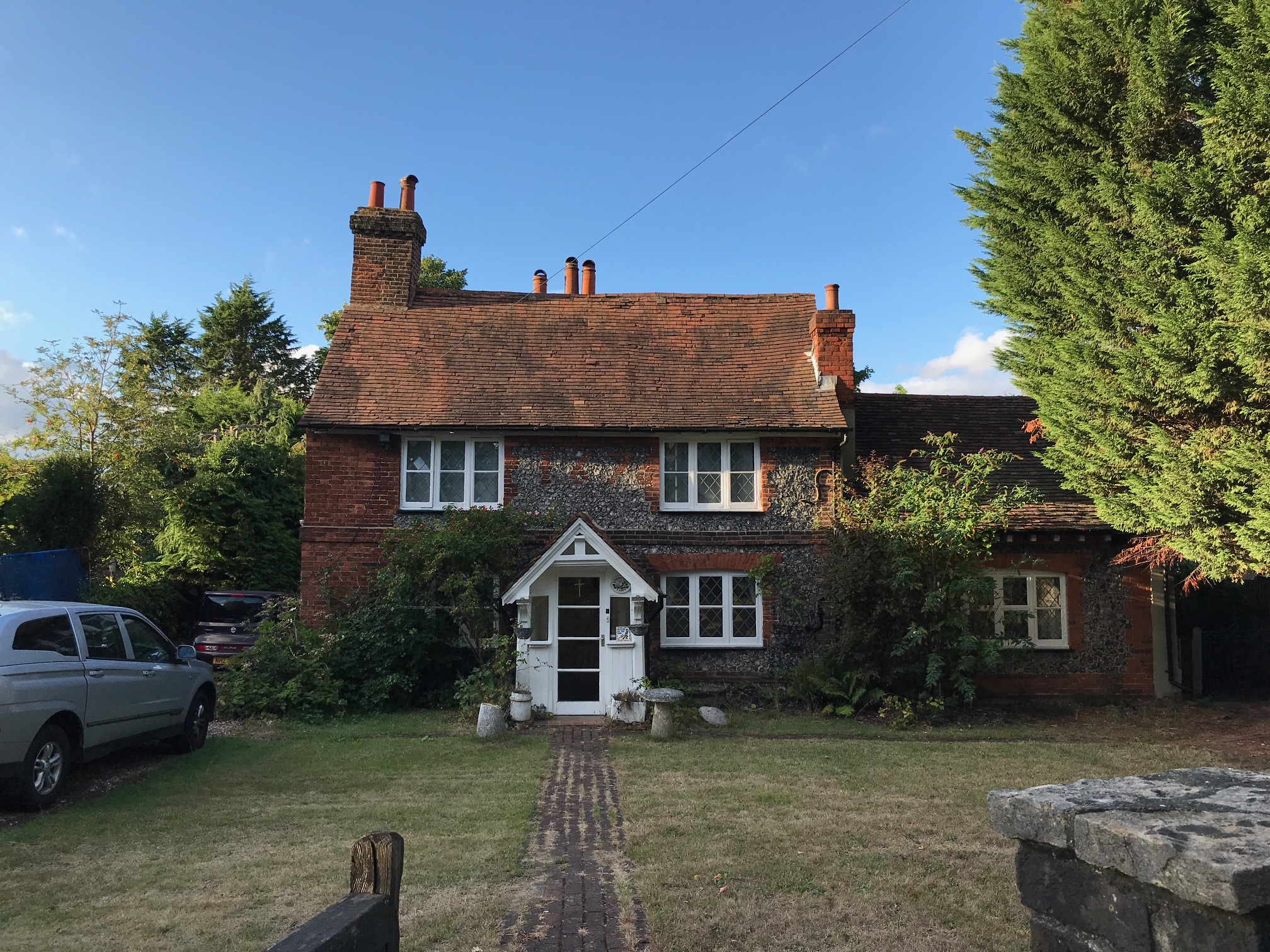
A 17th-century farm cottage on Addiscombe Road, listed at grade II

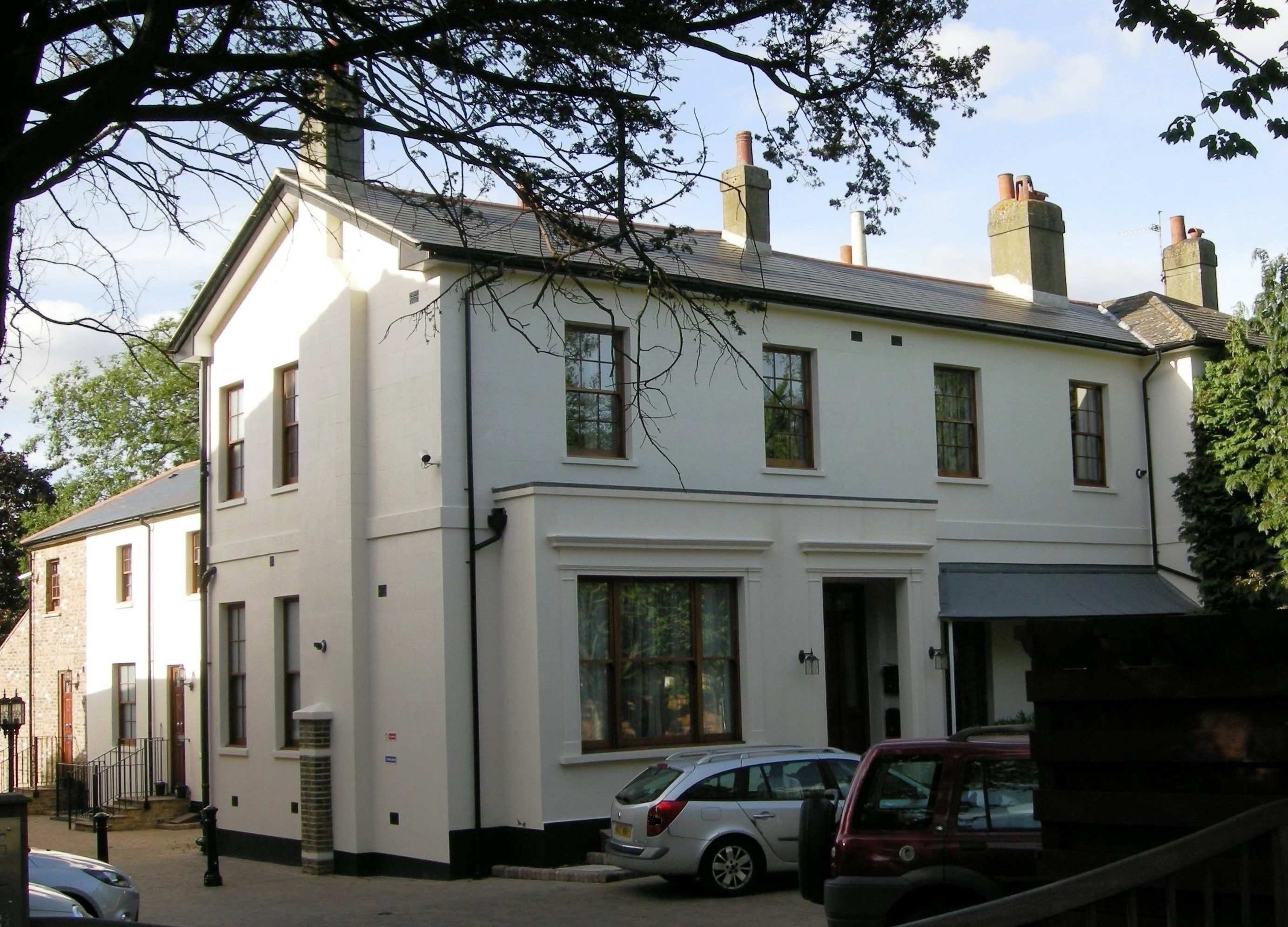
Ashleigh House, one of the few remnants of the formerly extensive Military Seminary

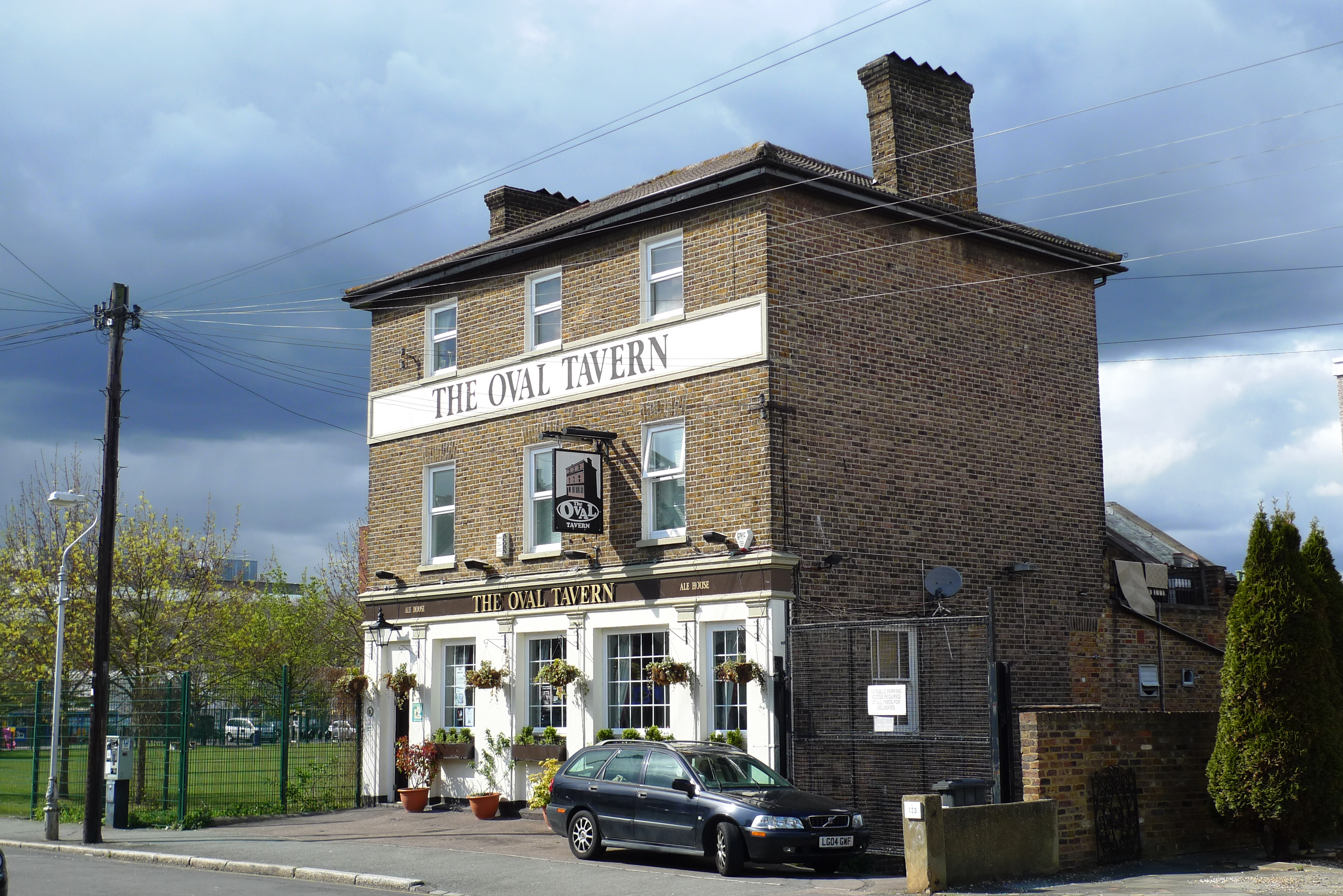
The Oval Tavern pub, Oval Road
