= Old Coulsdon =

Coordinates: 51.3018°N 0.1143°W

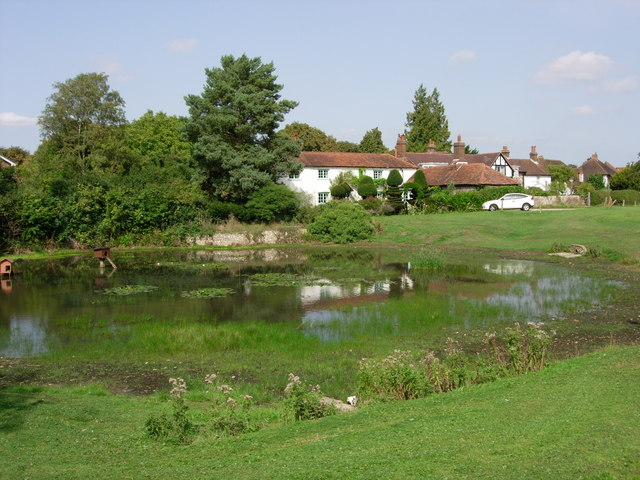
- Bradmore Green Pond - Old Coulsdon

- Location within Greater London
- OS grid reference: TQ315575
- London borough: Croydon
- Ceremonial county: Greater London
- Region: London
- Country: England
- Sovereign state: United Kingdom
- Post town: COULSDON
- Postcode district: CR5
- Police: Metropolitan
- Fire: London
- Ambulance: London
- UK Parliament: Croydon South
- London Assembly: Croydon and Sutton

Old Coulsdon is a village near Coulsdon in the London Borough of Croydon, England, 14.4 miles (23 km) south of Charing Cross. It is the southernmost settlement in Greater London.

== Schools ==
- Coulsdon Sixth Form College
- Oasis Academy Coulsdon (Formerly Coulsdon High School)
- Keston Junior, Primary and Infants
- Byron Primary School
- Coulsdon C of E Primary School

Oasis Academy Coulsdon was formerly Coulsdon High School. Before this it was Taunton Manor School. Coulsdon College was formerly Purley College and that was formed from Purley High School for Boys and Purley High School for Girls.

== Transport ==
There are four regular London bus services in the area: 60, 466, 404, and route N68 which provides a link into Central London every 30 minutes during the night.

The closest train station is Coulsdon South, 0.9 miles away.

== Churches ==
Old Coulsdon has one Church of England church, St John's the Evangelist. It is also home to St. Mary's Roman Catholic Church and Old Coulsdon Congregational Church.

== Politics ==
Old Coulsdon is in the Parliamentary constituency of Croydon South where the current MP since May 2015 has been Chris Philp of the Conservative Party. At the 2024 General Election, he was elected with a majority of 2,313.

At a local level, Old Coulsdon has two councillors - one Conservative and one Liberal Democrat - on Croydon Borough Council.
