= Addington Park =

Park in Addington, London, England

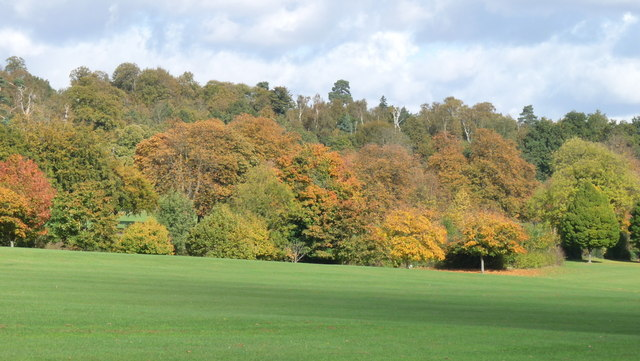
- Addington Park in the autumn.

- Location within Greater London
- Type: Public park
- Location: Addington
- Coordinates: 51.356°N 0.038°W
- Operator: London Borough of Croydon
- Open: All year (Closed at night)
- Public transit: London Buses multiple routes to Addington Village Interchange; Tramlink route 3 to Addington Village or Gravel Hill tram stop

Addington Park is a park situated in Addington in the London Borough of Croydon. The park covers an area of 24.5 acres (9.9 ha).

== History ==
The park was originally part of the manor of Addington and the area was used by Henry VIII for hunting purposes. The original manor house was replaced in 1768 by Addington Palace and the grounds were laid out by Capability Brown in 1781.

Most of the 24.50 acres which make up the public park were purchased from the owners of the 500 acres (200 ha) Addington Palace Estate by Croydon Council in 1930. Tennis courts were purchased after World War II.

== Transportation ==
The park is located next to Addington Interchange which is a tram and bus interchange. It is also served by Gravel Hill tram stop

== Facilities ==
- Historic landscaping
- Car parking
- Cricket and football pitches
- Tennis courts
- Children's playground

== See also ==
- List of Parks and Open Spaces in Croydon
- Addington Hills
- Ashburton Park
- Woodside Green
