= Beckenham Crematorium and Cemetery =

Cemetery in London, England

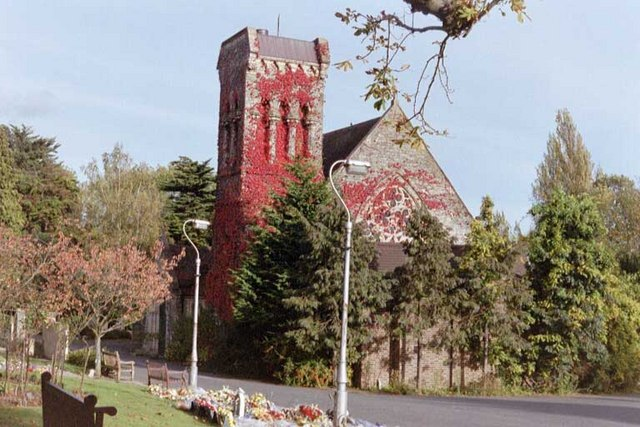
- Interactive map of Beckenham Crematorium and Cemetery

Details
- Established: 1876
- Location: Elmers Road, Beckenham, Kent, BR3 4TD
- Country: England
- Coordinates: 51.4015°N 0.0575°W
- Type: Public
- Owned by: Dignity Crematoria Ltd
- Size: 44 acres (18 ha)
- Website: Dignity Plc Company website

Beckenham Crematorium and Cemetery is a cemetery in the London Borough of Bromley, opened in 1876.

== Location and history ==
Beckenham Crematorium and Cemetery is located between South Norwood Country Park and Birkbeck. The cemetery was opened in 1876 although it is often erroneously reported as 1880 and was initially known as the Crystal Palace District Cemetery. It is often referred to today as the Elmers End Cemetery due to its location within Beckenham and proximity to Elmers End station. During the Second World War the larger of the cemetery’s two chapels was devastated during air raids and had to be demolished. The chapel that survived the bombing was converted to include cremation facilities and opened in 1956.

It is served by Birkbeck station, as well as Elmers End station for National Rail and London Tramlink and by Harrington Road tram stop for Tramlink.

== Burials ==
=== Memorials ===
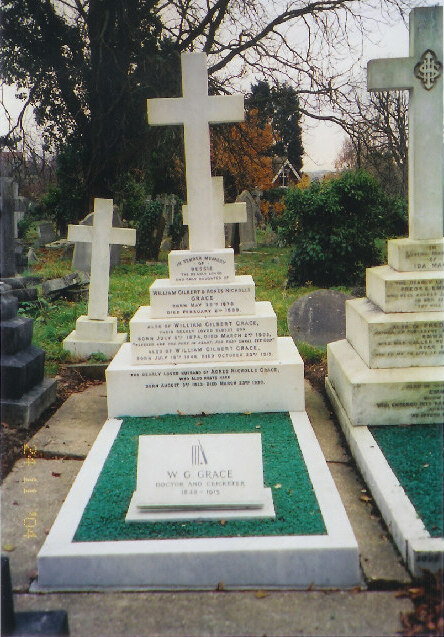
Grave of W.G. Grace

- 130 World War I graves, including casualties from the Royal Naval Depot at Crystal Palace Park and the Army Service Corps Motor Transport Depot at Grove Park. The graves of 30 which could not be individually marked are listed on a Screen War Memorial, while those of 40 which could not be satisfactorily maintained were later commemorated by 30 headstones placed in the cemetery's Second World War war graves plot.
- 127 World War II graves, 12 of which are in a purpose-made War Grave plot which also contains special memorials to three personnel of the same war whose graves could not be satisfactorily maintained.
- There is a memorial to 21 members of the Beckenham Auxiliary Fire Service who were killed in the course of a single night (19–20 April 1941) during a German raid on the East End of London in World War II. Many of the firemen were buried in the cemetery, some others in nearby West Wickham.

=== Notable burials ===
- Frank Bourne (1855–1945), British soldier
- Doris Castlerosse (1900–1942), socialite
- Thomas Crapper (1836–1910), businessman
- George Evans VC (1876–1937), World War I Victoria Cross recipient
- W.G. Grace (1848–1915), cricket player
- Robert Pate (1819–1895), British Army officer
- Samuel Rowbotham (known as Parallax) (1816–1884), inventor
- Josiah Stamp, 1st Baron Stamp (1880–1941), his wife, and son the 2nd Baron (who died together in an air raid on 16 April 1941).
- William Walker (1869–1918), diver
- Frederick Wolseley (1837–1899), inventor
