= South Norwood Leisure Centre =

Leisure center in London

Coordinates: 51.3936°N 0.0675°W

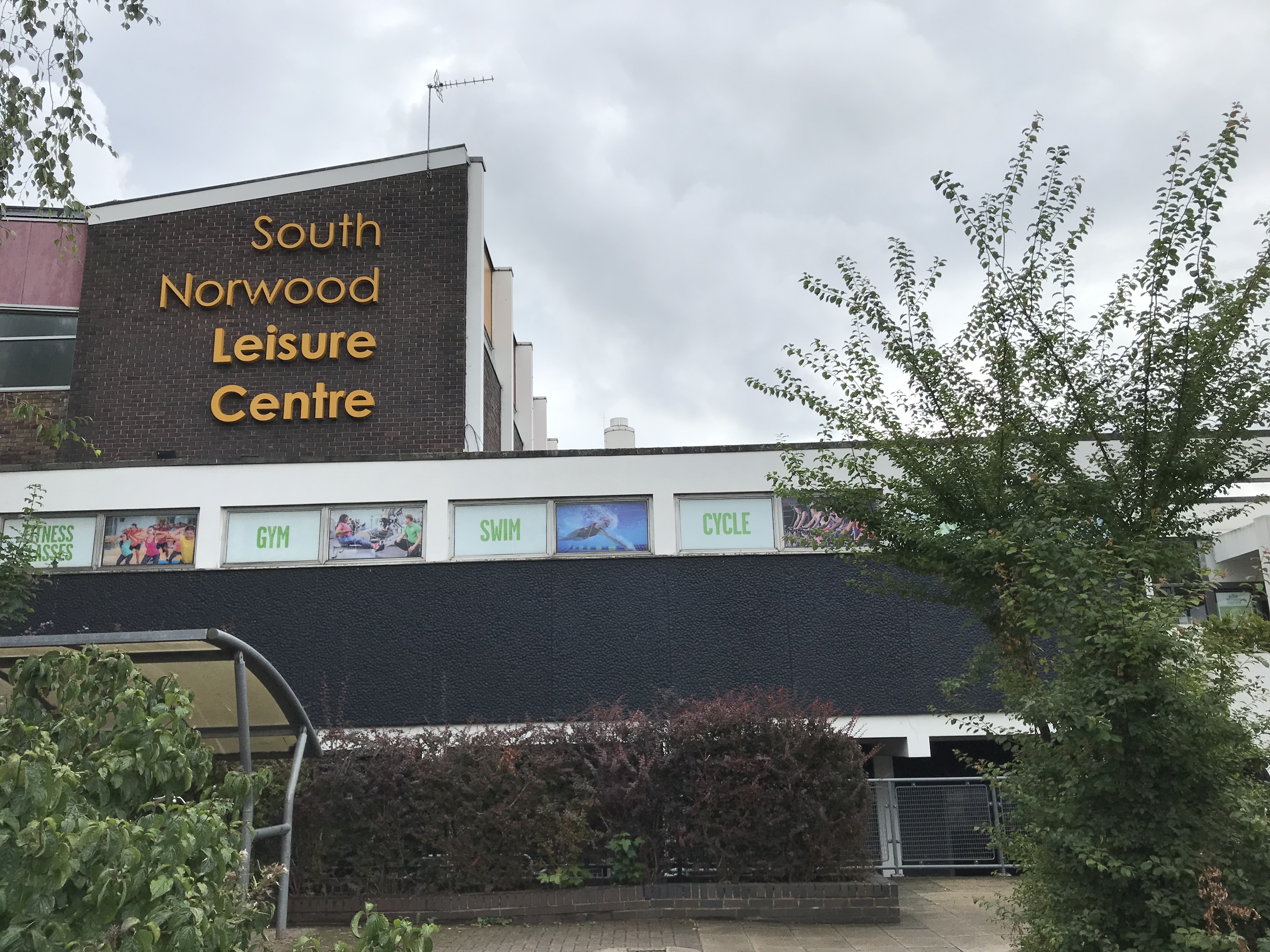
- Interactive map of South Norwood Leisure Centre
- Location: 164 Portland Road, South Norwood, Croydon, London, SE25 4PT
- Owner: Croydon Council
- Operator: Better (GLL)

Website
- South Norwood Leisure Centre on Instagram

South Norwood Leisure Centre is a leisure centre located on Portland Road in South Norwood in Croydon, London. It contains a 25m sized swimming pool, teaching pool, 32 station gym and two studios. The centre is managed by Better (GLL).

== Facilities ==
Provided facilities consist of a swimming pool, multi-purpose room, car park, gym, crèche, learning pool and Group Exercise Studio. Alongside this a range of enabling accessible services are provided for disabled visitors. Free swimming is provided at given hours for those aged 16 years and under.

== Activities ==
A non-exhaustative list of activities includes The SwimFit groups, swimming (open) and laned sessions, single gender sessions, primetime activities, pool based classes, a swim school, Personal Training, School holiday activities, gym and weights inductions and work out plans.

== History ==
In 2006–8 the centre underwent a refurbishment lasting more than a year and a half.

=== Period of Controversy ===
In 2005 the then Labour-controlled Croydon Council announced that it would knock down the centre and rebuild it from scratch, promising that a new building as a state of the art leisure facility. Originally, the Mayor of London, Ken Livingstone, had given the go-ahead for the development of a £10 million multi-purpose sports and leisure centre on a new site next to Croydon Sports Arena in South Norwood on 3 December 2003 but this plan was shelved in favour of redeveloping the existing site. In early 2006, the Council stated that the new leisure centre would take 18 months to build, and be finished by late 2007.

This exciting new facility will include a main pool, teaching pool, gym and sports hall which will bring great new leisure opportunities to Croydon.

A redevelopment plan was underway when the 2006 local elections led to a change of political control of the Council. The local Conservatives changed the policy away from rebuilding. After what they called "a long decision", local Conservatives decided, in order to save money, that instead of re-building it they would refurbish the facility at a reduced cost of £4 million. Croydon Council wrote that the refurbishment would give the pool an extra 30 years of life and defended the decision, insisting the £6 million saving can be used for modernising facilities elsewhere. However, this decision angered many local residents in the surrounding area.

On 25 July 2006, the Council upheld its controversial decision to refurbish rather than rebuild the Leisure Centre. Protesters were at the town hall for the meeting and handed over a 3,000 signature petition as part of a two-month campaign to persuade the council to change its mind. Nevertheless, at the end of a debate starting after 10pm the Council agreed the refurbishment plan would go ahead.

Speaking at the meeting, Cllr Hollands said: "I understand the disappointment but Croydon can't afford to build a new leisure centre." Cllr Sue Bennett, one of the ward councillors for South Norwood, stated: "To say it was a difficult decision is undoubted and to say it was the right decision is under much debate. However the council can't afford it."

== Transport links ==
There is a bus stop outside serving Peckham, Croydon, New Addington and elsewhere by the 130, 197 and the 312.

Norwood Junction railway station is the nearest overground station to the centre. The nearest Tramlink stop is Arena, for Beckenham, Wimbledon and Elmers End.
