= George Evans (VC) =

Recipient of the Victoria Cross (1876–1937)

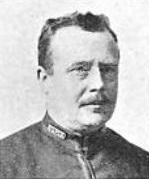
- Born: 16 February 1876; Kensington, Middlesex, England
- Died: 28 September 1937 (aged 61); Anerley, Kent, England
- Burial place: Elmers End Cemetery, Beckenham
- Military career
- Allegiance: United Kingdom
- Branch: British Army
- Service years: 1894–1902, 1915–1919
- Rank: Company Sergeant-Major
- Units: Scots Guards; Manchester Regiment
- Conflicts: Second Boer War; World War I
- Awards: Victoria Cross
- Other work: NSPCC Inspector

William John George Evans VC (16 February 1876 – 28 September 1937) was an English recipient of the Victoria Cross, the highest and most prestigious award for gallantry in the face of the enemy that can be awarded to British and Commonwealth forces.

== Biography ==
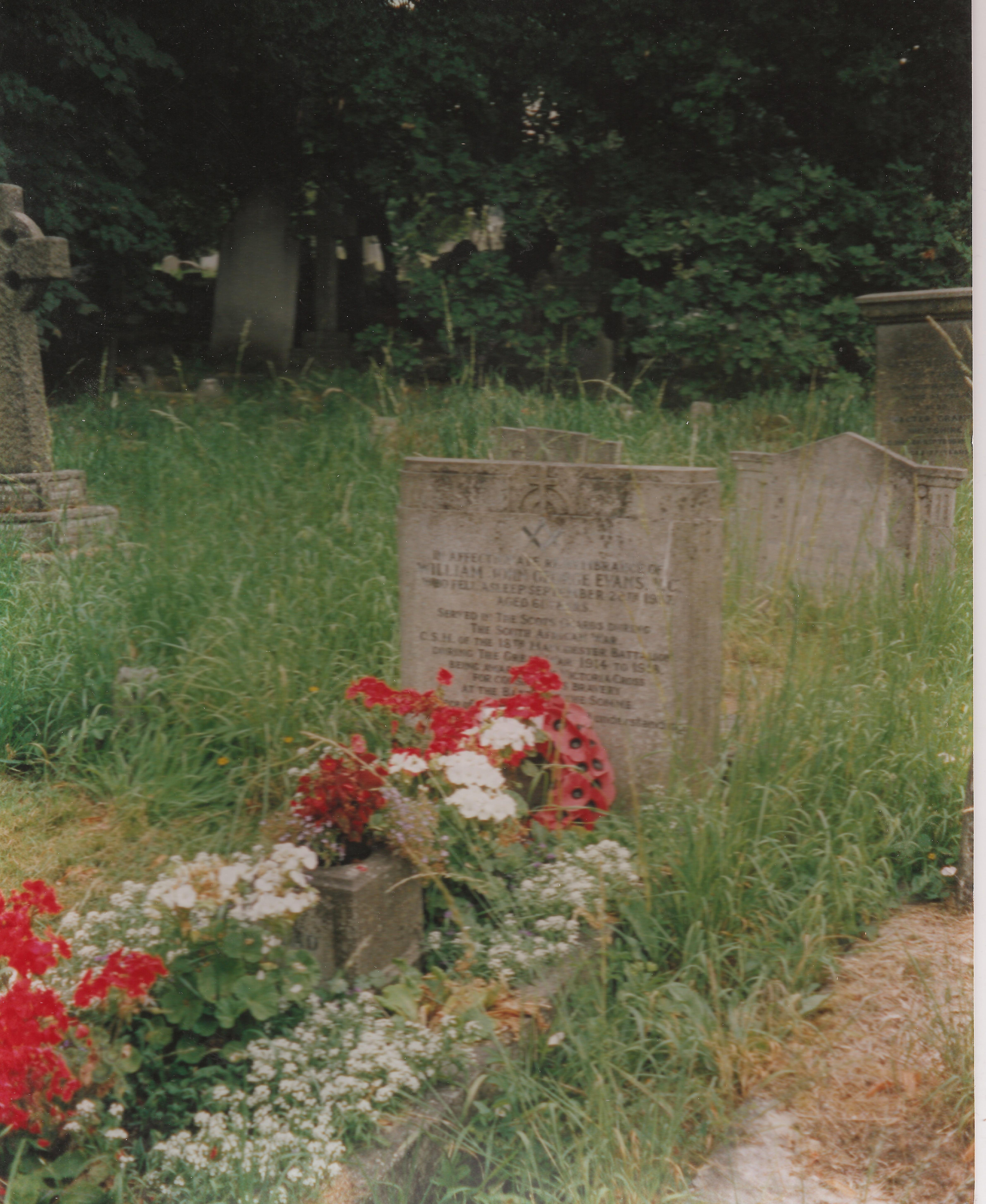
Evans' grave at Beckenham Cemetery

Evans first joined the Scots Guards in March 1894, and served during the Second Boer War. He left the Army in August 1902, to work for the NSPCC, and rejoined in January 1915. When he was 40 years old, and a Company Sergeant-Major in the 18th Battalion (3rd Manchester Pals), The Manchester Regiment of the British Army during the First World War, Evans was awarded the Victoria Cross for his deeds on 30 July 1916 during the Battle of the Somme at Guillemont, France:

Company Sergeant-Major Evans volunteered to take back an important message after five runners had been killed in attempting to do so. He had to cover about 700 yards, the whole of which was under observation from the enemy. He succeeded in delivering the message despite being wounded, and then rejoined his company despite having been advised to go to the dressing station. The return journey had again meant facing 700 yards of severe rifle and machine-gun fire, but by dodging from shell-hole to shell-hole, he managed it.

Evans was captured following his VC action and spent the rest of the war as a POW. His Victoria Cross, gazetted in January 1920, was the last to be gazetted for the First World War.

He died on 28 September 1937 and was buried with full military honours in Elmers End Cemetery, Beckenham.

His VC medal group is still held by his family and is loaned to the Imperial War Museum in London, where they are on display in the Lord Ashcroft VC/GC Gallery.

== Bibliography ==
- Gliddon, Gerald (2011) [1991]. Somme 1916. VCs of the First World War. The History Press. ISBN 978-0-7524-6303-2.
