= Norwood New Town =

Coordinates: 51.42°N 0.092°W

- Location within Greater London
- OS grid reference: TQ325705
- London borough: Croydon
- Ceremonial county: Greater London
- Region: London
- Country: England
- Sovereign state: United Kingdom
- Post town: LONDON
- Postcode district: SE19
- Dialling code: 020
- Police: Metropolitan
- Fire: London
- Ambulance: London
- London Assembly: Croydon and Sutton

Norwood New Town is a largely residential, former working-class enclave within the larger district of Upper Norwood in South London. It is within the London Borough of Croydon. In common with the neighbouring districts of West Norwood, South Norwood and Upper Norwood, it is named after the contraction of the Great North Wood, which once occupied this area.

== History ==
Norwood New Town was built from 1840 purposely as one of the main working class areas of early Norwood (the others were South Norwood and the 'Triangle' of Upper Norwood). It was built as a walled estate to separate its working-class inhabitants from the upper-class country houses and farm land, which at that time made up the district. Its construction commenced before the rebuilding of the Crystal Palace on Norwood Hill but it became home to many of the workers employed on the construction of the Palace.

The walled-in terraced streets formed a particularly close community, which occupied an area south of Central Hill. The enclosed streets were:

- Oxford Road
- Naseby Road (formerly Albert Road)
- Dover Road (formerly Albert Terrace)
- Crystal Terrace
- Eagle Hill (formerly Spa Road)

The wall was demolished in 1930 and the district was integrated into the neighbouring area, which was becoming increasingly suburbanised.

== Transport ==
=== Bus ===
Buses use the A214 (Crown Dale) and the A215 (Knight's Hill).

=== Rail ===
The high elevation of the area has made building railways very difficult so the area does not have a station of its own. The closest railway stations are West Norwood and Gipsy Hill.

== Nearest places ==
- West Norwood to the north
- Upper Norwood for the larger surrounding district
- Norbury to the south west
- South Norwood to the south
- Streatham to the west.
