= Margaret Chute =

- Born: June 7, 1886; South Norwood, London, England, UK
- Died: November 30, 1948 (aged 62); Los Angeles, California, United States
- Relatives: Edmund Breon (partner); Andrew McFadyean (brother-in-law); William Macready (great-uncle); William John Charles Möens (great-great-uncle); Desmond Chute (first-cousin); Robert Byron (cousin removed); David Charles Manners (cousin removed)

Margaret Chute (1886–1948) was an English stage actor, suffragist, freelance journalist, and photographer.

== Personal life ==
Chute was the daughter of Charles Kean Chute and Sybil Claridge Andrews. Her parents were notable stage actors, performing in the West End and throughout Britain, including at Hastings’ Gaiety Theatre.

During World War II, Joan Crawford volunteered as Chute's guarantor, allowing her to move from England and continue working in the United States.

Chute passed away in Los Angeles, California on November 30, 1948, due to a stroke caused by cirrhosis of the liver.

== Career ==
Chute was on the professional stage from 1908-1919. In 1911 to 1912, she played Mrs. Cowper-Cowper in the first revival of Lady Windermere's Fan.

In 1917, George Robey employed Chute as his private secretary. In 1920, she was employed by Sir Oswald Stoll as the first woman press representative for London's Coliseum and Alhambra theatres.

In 1925, Chute travelled to Germany to survey their studio systems. In 1926, Chute travelled to Hollywood to interview some of her favorite film stars, including Mary Pickford, Charlie Chaplin and Douglas Fairbanks. She would return every year. Chute wrote for various fan magazines including Hollywood Magazine, Photoplay, and Picture Play magazine. She also wrote for United Press.

Chute also took photographs of many stars, including Jean Harlow, Marion Davies, Dorothy Sebastian, and Joan Crawford.

Her career declined after Chute published articles exposing the mistreatment of women in Hollywood, similar to today's MeToo movement.

== Legacy ==
In July 2021, The Stables Theatre premiered Picture Picture by Chute's relation David Charles Manners, which focused on Chute's life and hosted the first-ever exhibition of Chute's photographs.

== Performances ==
Performances
Year	Play	Part	Theatre
1908-09	Aladdin	chorus & dancer	Prince’s, Bristol
1909	Cinderella	Fairy Godmother (understudy + 5 weeks in role)	Adelphi, London
1909	The Proud Prince	chorus	Lyceum, London
1910	F.R. Benson's Co. tour of multiple Shakespeare plays The School for Scandal The Knight of the Burning Pestle	multiple roles	national tour
1910	The Eccentric Lord Comberdene	company role	St. James's, London
1910	The Miniature	Beadnell	St. James's, London
1911-12	Lady Windermere's Fan	Mrs Cowper-Cowper	St. James's, London
1912	The Bear Leaders	Lloyd	Comedy Theatre, London
1913	Turandot, Princess of China	Tien-wa	St. James's, London
1913	Lady Noggs	Suzette	Comedy Theatre, London
1913	The Month of Mary	Sister of Charity	The Little Theatre, Adelphi (Pioneer Players)
1913	The Big Game	Mildred Carruthers	New Theatre, London
1914	Love and the Law	Margaret	Devonshire Park, Eastbourne
1914	The Impromptus	Margaret Kean	Bournemouth Winter Gardens & Boscombe Pier
1914-15	Humpty Dumpty	Pansy	Prince's, Bristol
1915-16	Goody Two Shoes	Ronnie, the Mayor’s son	Prince's, Bristol
1919	The Lymelights	Margaret Kean	12-week tour
