= Robert Pate =

British Army officer

- Born: Robert Francis Pate; 25 December 1819; Wisbech, Isle of Ely, Cambridgeshire, Great Britain
- Died: 6 February 1895 (aged 75); London, England
- Spouse: Mary Elizabeth Brown (m. 1857)
- Military career
- Allegiance: United Kingdom
- Branch: British Army
- Service years: 1841–1846
- Rank: Lieutenant
- Unit: 10th (Prince of Wales's Own) Regiment of (Light) Dragoons (Hussars)

Robert Francis Pate Jr. (25 December 1819 – 6 February 1895) was a former British Army officer, remembered for his assault on Queen Victoria on 27 June 1850.

== Early life ==
Robert Pate was born on Christmas Day, 1819, in Wisbech, Isle of Ely, Cambridgeshire, the son of Robert Francis Pate, a wealthy corn dealer and Maria (née Wilson). His parents married in Cambridge on 16 March 1818. His mother died on 27 April in 1821. His father came from humble origins, but through trade became a gentleman and eventually Deputy Lieutenant of Cambridgeshire and High Sheriff of Cambridgeshire and Huntingdonshire in 1847.

Pate was educated in Norwich. In 1841, his father purchased for him a commission as cornet in the 10th Light Dragoons. The Commercial Telegraph of 11 February 1841 states "Robert Pate to be Cornet, vice Lord G A Beauclerk War Office 5 Feb 1841". He purchased a promotion to Lieutenant the following year. He was gazetted "Cornet Robert Pate to be Lieutenant, by purchase, vice Williams. Dated 22d July 1842" and "Francis Leigh, Gent. To be Cornet, by purchase, vice Pate. Dated 22d July 1842".

In 1844, while on a tour of duty in Ireland, his horses, including his favourite, and his dog were put down because of rabies, and Pate began to show signs of lunacy. He returned to Wisbech without leave in 1844. He resigned his commission in March 1846 and took up residence in Piccadilly, London, where he lived the life of a recluse. He took frequent walks in the royal parks, where his dandy clothing and strange behaviour drew attention.

== Assassination attempt ==
The Queen was visiting Cambridge House in Piccadilly on 27 June 1850, in order to see her dying uncle, Prince Adolphus, Duke of Cambridge. About 6:20 that evening, her carriage was leaving the courtyard when Pate hit her on the head with the short feruled cane that he was carrying. The blow was heavy enough to crush her bonnet and draw a little blood. The attack was the only one that caused Victoria actual harm and the mark on her forehead remained for a decade. Pate was immediately arrested by sergeant James Silver and taken to Vine Street police station; later he was held at Newgate prison.

== Trial ==
He was put on trial at the Central Criminal Court. The Presiding Judge Mr Baron Anderson was accompanied by Mr Justice Patterson and Mr Justice Talfound. He was charged with three indictments; firstly unlawfully and maliciously striking the Queen, secondly with alarming the Queen, and thirdly with breach of the peace. The Attorney-General, the Solicitor-General (Mr Welsby), Mr Bodkin, and Mr Clerk were engaged for the prosecution and Mr Cockburn QC and Mr Huddlestone for the defendant. His defence team did not plead insanity, but instead asked for a lenient sentence on the grounds of a momentary lapse caused by a weak mind. The jury retired at twenty minutes past three, and did not return into court until five minutes past seven, when they gave a verdict of guilty. The prisoner was immediately called up for judgement. Pate was sentenced to seven years of penal transportation, which his father thought a better result than the ignominy of imprisonment in the UK accompanied by a birching, even though that was a nominally lesser sentence.

== In Tasmania ==
Pate's class ensured that he received lenient treatment in prison and on the subsequent journey as one of 261 convicts on the William Jardine departing on 9 August 1850 to Van Diemen's Land (now known as Tasmania) where he arrived on 14 November 1850. However, on arrival he was consigned to the Cascades penal settlement on the Tasman Peninsula like a common criminal. He served less than a year under what for him must have been an especially hard regime, and was then transferred to more amenable work in the community until the end of his sentence.

== Later life ==
Pate's father died in 1856, but most of his money passed to other relations and Pate only received an annuity of £300 and a share of his personal possessions. However, his money problems were solved the following year when Pate married Mary Elizabeth Brown, a rich heiress. They lived in Hobart Town, Tasmania for eight years before selling up and returning to London. The incident received further publicity when newspapers published articles about subsequent attacks on the Queen. Robert Pate lived a quiet life in the capital until his death in 1895 at which time he was living at Broughton, Ross Road, South Norwood. Under the terms of his will (dated 20 July), he left £22,464 to his widow, the sole executrix. He is buried in Beckenham Crematorium and Cemetery.

== See also ==
- List of convicts transported to Australia
