= Selhurst Road =

Street in the London Borough of Croydon

Coordinates: 51°23′40″N 0°05′08″W

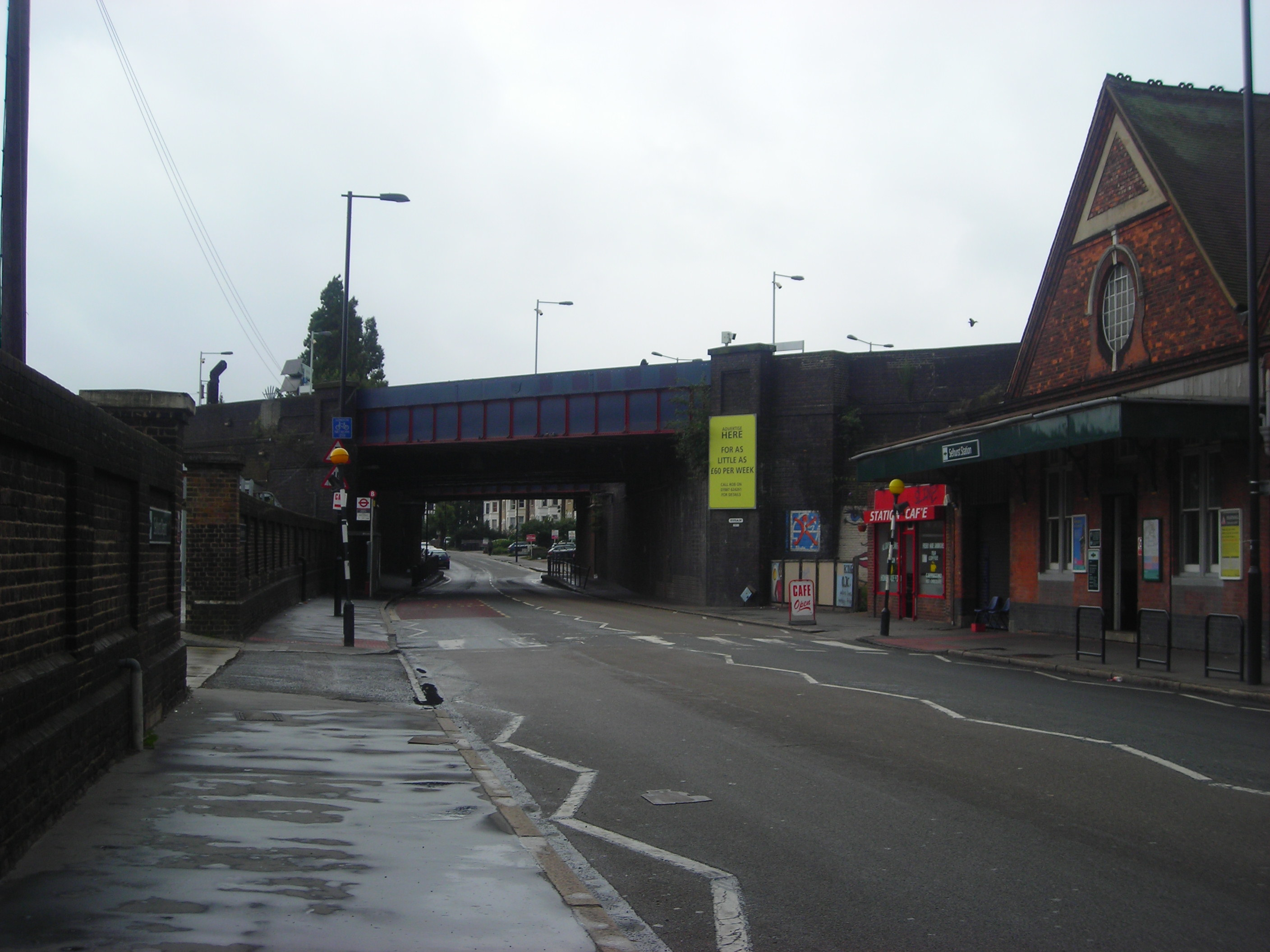
Selhust Station on Selhurst Road

Selhurst Road is a main road between South Norwood and Selhurst in the London Borough of Croydon, south London. It forms part of the A213 road which is a major A Road connecting both Sydenham and Croydon.

The road starts in South Norwood from the High Street, which is also part of the A213, then it carries on to Selhurst railway station opposite Heavers Meadow then on a side road it passes the BRIT School. The road carries on until it meets Northcote Road at a corner, this road carries on until it hits a five way junction with Whitehorse Road (towards Thornton Heath and Croydon), Windmill Road (towards Purley Way), Limes Road (residential) and Hampton Road (retail). The road passes four different schools within only 1,500 metres of each other.

Roberts Cycles, a bicycle manufacturer and custom framebuilder is located on the road. Other shops located on Selhurst or Northcote Road are Halfords, Staples, a Shell Petrol Station, Tesco Express and numerous pubs.
