= William Walker (diver) =

English diver

William Walker MVO
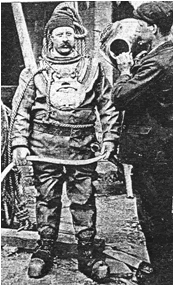
- William Walker, c. 1912
- Born: William Robert Bellenie, 1869; Newington, London
- Died: 1918 (aged 48–49)
- Resting place: Beckenham Crematorium and Cemetery, London
- Monuments: Statue at Winchester Cathedral
- Citizenship: British
- Occupation: Diver
- Known for: Shored up Winchester Cathedral between 1906 and 1911

William Walker MVO (1869–1918) was an English diver famous for shoring up the southern and eastern sides of Winchester Cathedral.

== Early life ==
He was born William Robert Bellenie, in Newington, Surrey, England, in 1869. Around 1900, he adopted the name William Bellenie-Walker, eventually dropping the Bellenie part to be known as Walker.

== Diving career ==
In 1887, Walker began diver training at Portsmouth Dockyard. He worked through the roles of diver's attendant and diver's signal man, passing his medical exam and deep-water test to qualify as a deep-water diver in 1892.

In his time, William Walker was the most experienced diver of Siebe Gorman Ltd.

== Winchester Cathedral ==
Between 1906 and 1911, working in water up to a depth of six metres (20 feet), he shored up Winchester Cathedral, using more than 25,800 bags of concrete, 114,900 concrete blocks, and 900,000 bricks.

Before his work, the cathedral had been in imminent danger of collapse as it sank slowly into the ground, which consisted of peat. To enable bricklayers to build supporting walls, the groundwater level had to be lowered. Without intervention, the removal of the groundwater would have caused the collapse of the building. So, to give temporary support to the foundation walls, some 235 pits were dug along the southern and eastern sides of the building, each about six metres deep. Walker went down and shored up the walls by putting concrete underneath them. He worked six hours a day—in complete darkness, because the sediment suspended in the water was impenetrable to light.

After Walker finished his work, the groundwater was pumped out and the concrete he had placed bore the foundation walls. Conventional bricklayers then were able to do their work in the usual way and restore the damaged walls.

During the latter part of his time working at Winchester, Walker cycled home at weekends, 70 miles to South Norwood, returning by train on the Monday.

To celebrate the completion of the work, a thanksgiving service, led by the Archbishop of Canterbury, was held on 15 July 1912. At this, Walker was presented with a silver rose bowl by King George V. Newspaper reports at the time remarked that this was the second time Walker had met George V, the first being when the king was a naval cadet and Walker was his diving instructor.

Later, Walker was honoured by being appointed a Member of the Royal Victorian Order (MVO).

An interview that Walker gave to the Hampshire Observer in 1911 gives insight into his work. In it, Walker reveals that, unlike some other divers, he had never worked on any treasure dives. Other aspects of his work:

- Rescue work, December 1896, at the River Level Colliery at Abernant, near Aberdare Wales, when the pit was flooded and six men and boys drowned.
- Work on the building of the Blackwall Tunnel, 1891–1897.
- Being foreman in charge of works on the construction of the new naval docks in Gibraltar.
- Work on the construction of the jetty for the Royal Victoria Dock Granary, 1905.
- Emergency work, which called him away from Winchester, on the wreck of the SS Dordone in Newport.
- Work with Sir Leonard Hill developing linear decompression tables.

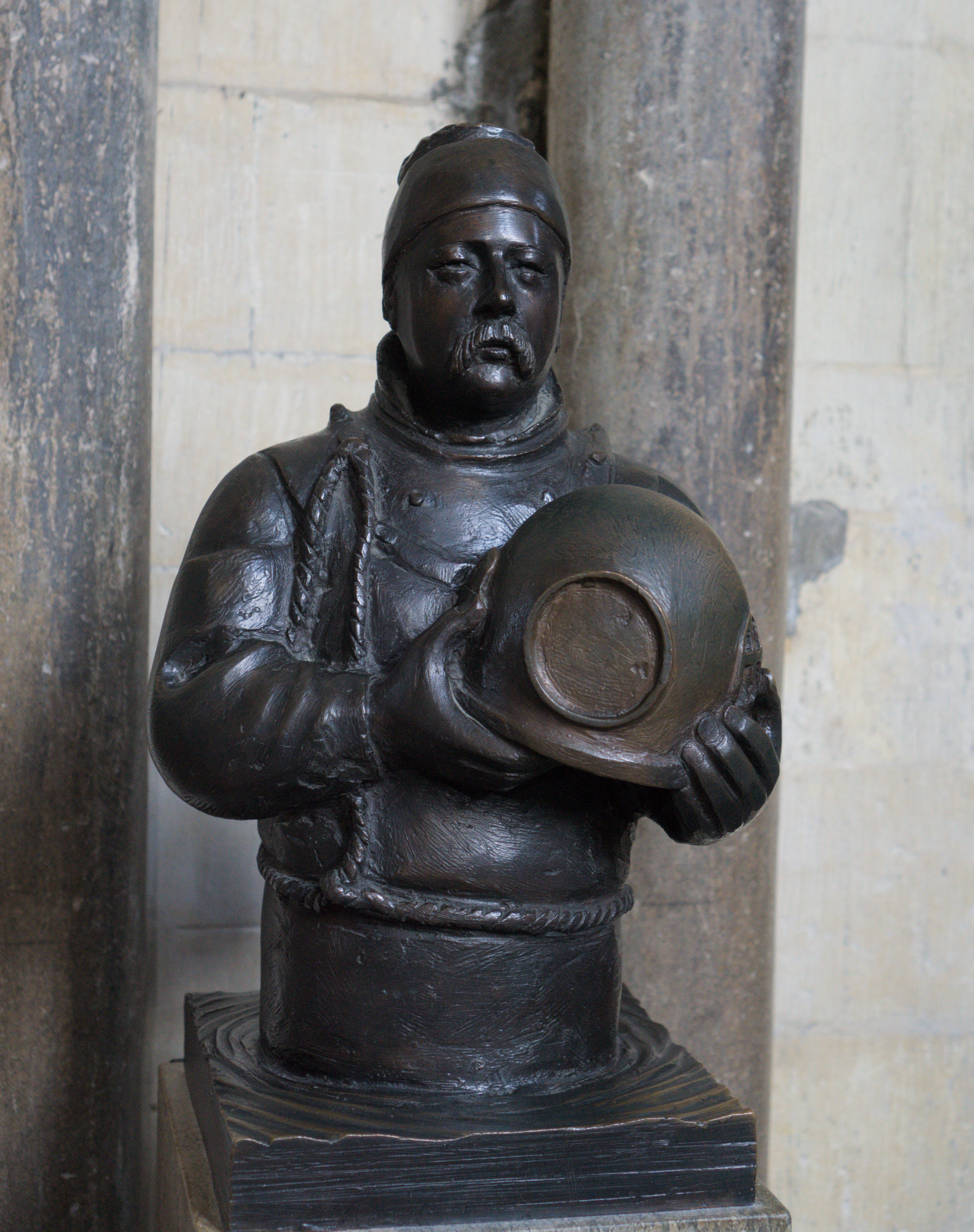
Statuette of Walker at Winchester Cathedral

Part of the interview article: "In cold water diving he [William] explained what a man has to contend with is the pressure". At Gibraltar he says: "Two of my men died through pressure of water".

In response to questions about his work on Winchester, William says "It was not difficult. It was straightforward work, but had to be carefully done". He went on to say that Mr. Jackson had told him that he was very pleased with the work and that he had done what no other man had done—that he had laid the foundation of a whole cathedral. Walker said "I am proud of the honour".

A commemoration service was held at Winchester Cathedral, 100 years after he died.

== Family and death ==
Walker married twice. His first wife died before he began work at Winchester. He married his second wife, sister of his first, in 1907, and had several children during his years working at Winchester.

Walker died during the Spanish flu epidemic of 1918 and is buried in Beckenham Crematorium and Cemetery, London. His grave bears the words: "The diver who with his own hands saved Winchester Cathedral."

== Legacy ==
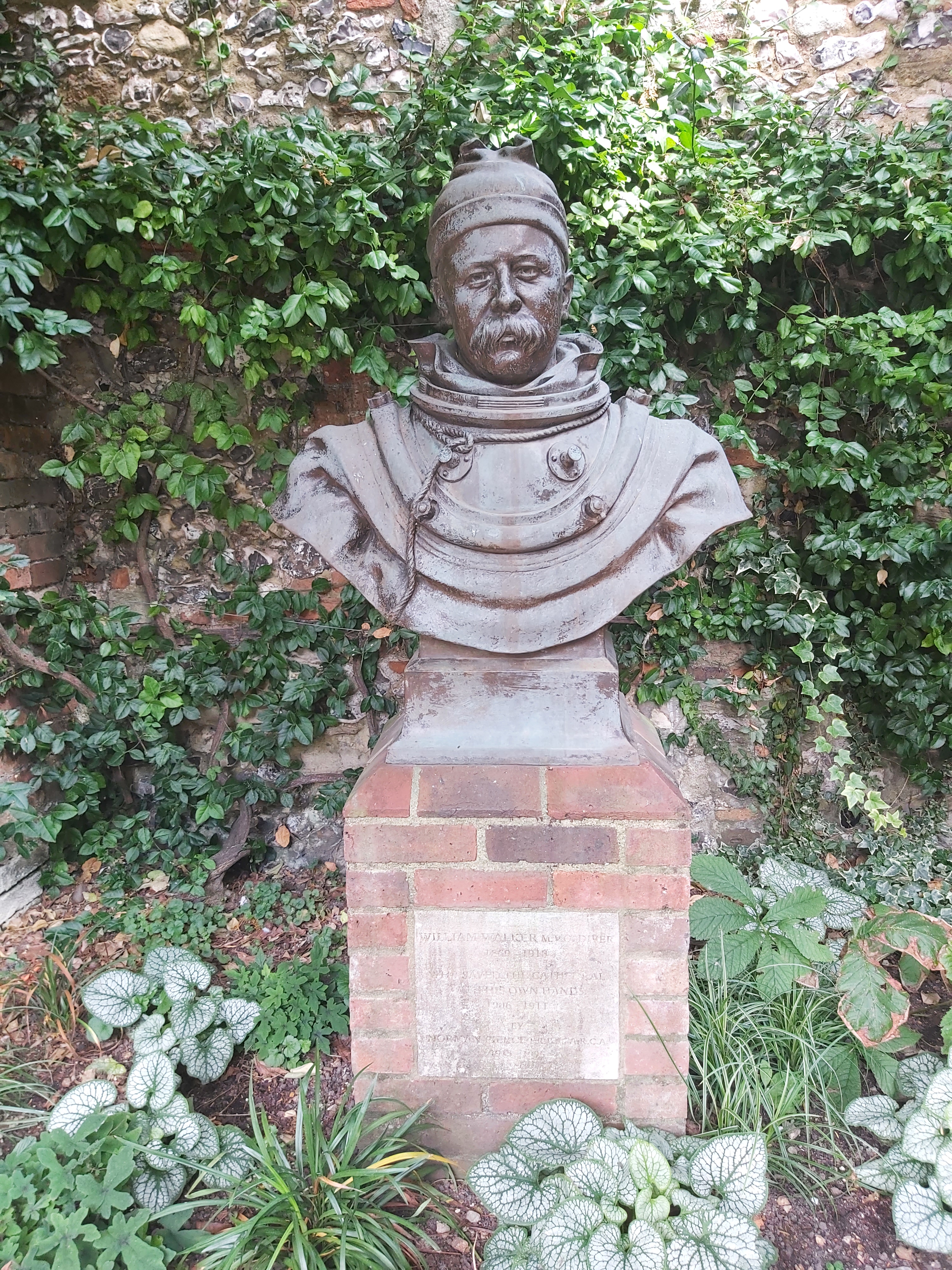
Bust of William Walker in the Cathedral gardens

A small statue of Walker is displayed in the cathedral, near the shrine of St Swithun and the remains of King Canute. Until May 2001 the statue was one mistakenly modelled on the project's consultant engineer, Francis Fox. There is also a bust of Walker in the Cathedral gardens. A public house in Winchester is also named after him. A plaque commemorates him on 118 Portland Road, South Norwood, where he lived.

A service of remembrance for Walker was held at the Cathedral in October 2018. An exhibition about Walker ran until 31 October.

The fifth track, titled "Winchester Diver", on progressive rock band Big Big Train's 2009 album The Underfall Yard is about Walker and his working conditions during the shoring up of the cathedral.
