= Frank Bourne =

British Army officer

Frank Bourne OBE DCM
- Photograph of Frank Bourne taken c.1905
- Born: 27 April 1855; Balcombe, England
- Died: 9 May 1945 (aged 90); Beckenham, London, England
- Burial place: Beckenham Crematorium and Cemetery
- Military career
- Allegiance: United Kingdom/British Empire
- Branch: British Army
- Service years: 1872–1907, 1914–1919
- Rank: Lieutenant colonel
- Unit: 24th Regiment of Foot
- Conflicts: Anglo-Zulu War: Battle of Rorke's Drift; Third Anglo-Burmese War World War I
- Awards: Officer of the Order of the British Empire; Distinguished Conduct Medal

Frank Bourne grave in Beckenham

Lieutenant-Colonel Frank Edward Bourne OBE DCM (27 April 1855 – 9 May 1945) was a decorated British soldier and the last living survivor of the defence of Rorke's Drift during the 1879 Anglo-Zulu War. He also served during World War I.

== Early life ==
Born in Balcombe, Sussex, England on 27 April 1855 to James and Harriett (Gaston) Bourne. He was the youngest of eight children with five brothers and two sisters. Bourne enlisted in the Army at Reigate on 18 December 1872. Four years later he had been promoted to colour sergeant, becoming the youngest NCO of this rank in the entire British Army. This earned him the nickname 'The Kid'.

== Rorke's Drift ==
On 22 and 23 January 1879, Bourne was part of the garrison at Rorke's Drift, Natal, South Africa, which held off a Zulu army. Bourne, who was now an NCO in B Company, 2nd Battalion, 24th (2nd Warwickshire) Regiment of Foot, helped organise the defence at the mission station and field hospital. Throughout the day and night of the battle, the Zulus made repeated attacks against the barricades, but the outnumbered defenders held out until relief arrived.

For his bravery, Bourne received the Distinguished Conduct Medal (DCM) for "outstanding coolness and courage" during the battle, with a £10 annuity. The DCM, until 1993, was the second highest military decoration (after the Victoria Cross) awarded to other ranks of the British Army. He was offered a commission, but "being an eighth son, and the family exchequer ... empty", he declined it.

== Later career ==
After Rorke's Drift, Frank Bourne served in British India and Burma, being promoted to Quartermaster-Sergeant in 1884. He was commissioned in 1890. In 1893 he was appointed adjutant of the School of Musketry at Hythe, Kent, retiring from the army in 1907. During World War I, he rejoined and served as adjutant of the School of Musketry in Dublin. At the end of the war, he was given the honorary rank of lieutenant colonel and appointed OBE. He retired for the second time in 1919, at the age of 64.

== Later life ==
During the Second World War Bourne volunteered and served in the Home Guard. Bourne lived in retirement at 16 Kings Hall Road, Beckenham, Kent. He was the last surviving defender from Rorke's Drift, when he died on 9 May 1945, the day after VE Day, at the age of 90. Bourne was buried in Beckenham Cemetery.

== Legacy ==
Bourne's house in Beckenham has been adorned with a blue plaque.

In the 1964 film Zulu, Bourne is depicted as a middle-aged veteran played by Nigel Green.
