= Selhurst =

Coordinates: 51.3995°N 0.0747°W

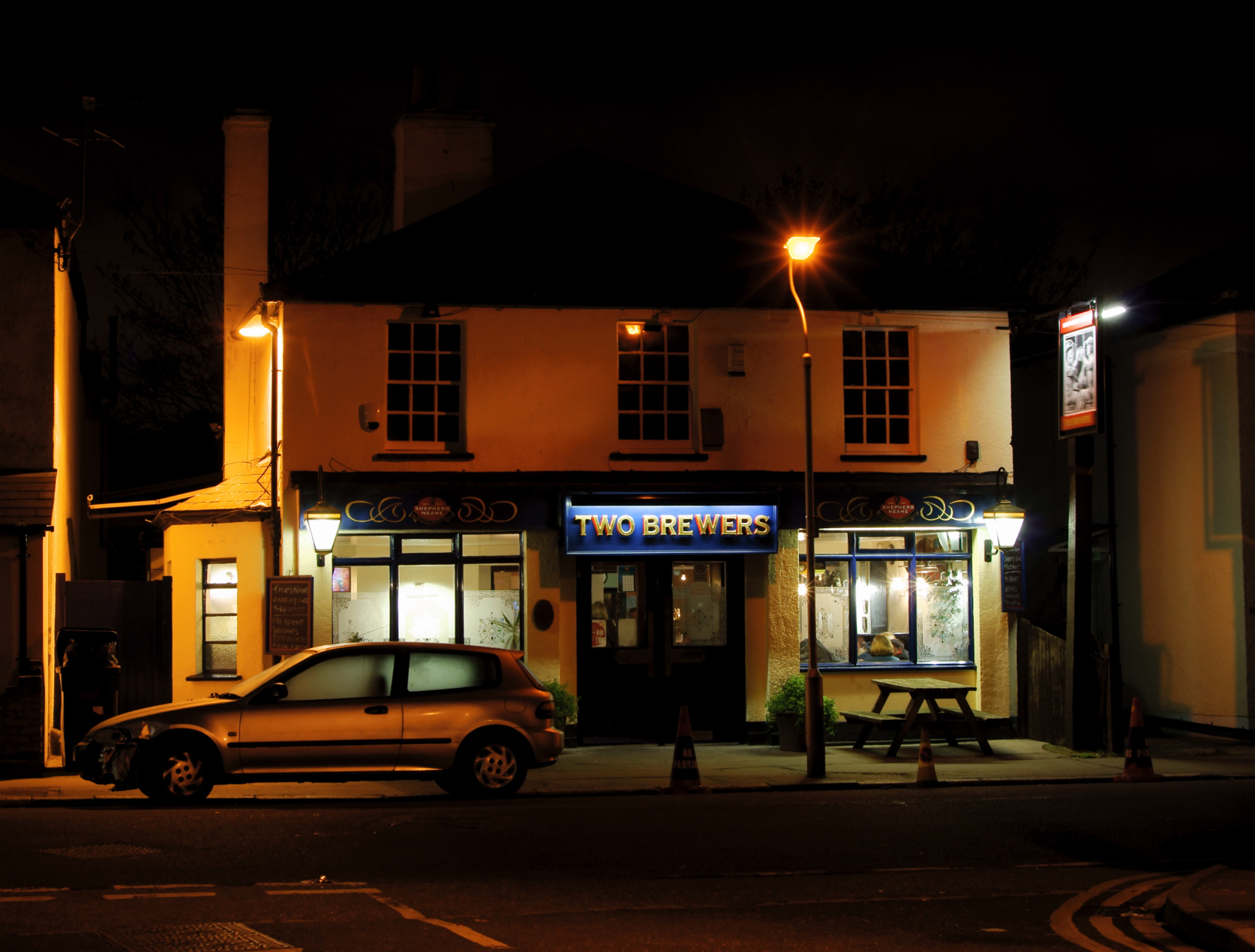
- The Two Brewers pub, Selhurst

- Location within Greater London
- Population: 18,087 (2011 Census. Ward)
- OS grid reference: TQ340684
- London borough: Croydon
- Ceremonial county: Greater London
- Region: London
- Country: England
- Sovereign state: United Kingdom
- Post town: LONDON
- Postcode district: SE25
- Post town: CROYDON
- Postcode district: CR0
- Dialling code: 020
- Police: Metropolitan
- Fire: London
- Ambulance: London
- UK Parliament: Streatham and Croydon North
- London Assembly: Croydon and Sutton

Selhurst is a suburb in the London Borough of Croydon, England, 7.8 miles (12.6 km) south-east of Charing Cross. Historically in Surrey, the suburb is bounded to the west and south by Thornton Heath and Croydon and to the east and south by South Norwood and Woodside. The stadium Selhurst Park, home of Crystal Palace Football Club, is located at the northern end of the neighbourhood.

== History ==
Selhurst is named after the Old English for "dwelling in a wood", or possibly 'dwelling where willows grow'; the name is first recorded in 1225. Saxon coins were found here when the railway station was built. Housing began to be built in the area following the opening of the Croydon Canal in 1809, however the canal proved to be a failure and it closed in 1836. Races were held at Heaver's Farm in the 1850s-60s. Further housing development occurred following the opening of Selhurst train station in 1865.

== Demography ==
White British is the largest ethnic group as of the 2011 census, forming 26% of the population. The second and third largest were Black Caribbean and Black African, both 14% each. 65.5% of the population are of BAME minority background, higher than the Croydon average.

The median house price in Selhurst ward in 2014 was £212,998, which is the 17th lowest out of the 628 wards of Greater London.

== Education ==
The BRIT School, a performing arts school operated by The BRIT foundation, more commonly known for the BRIT Awards, is located in the area.

== Transport ==
Selhurst railway station has frequent trains north to London Victoria, and London Bridge at peak times, and south to Sutton, Caterham and Epsom Downs via East Croydon and West Croydon. Selhurst Depot is mainly used by the Southern train operating company, and lies on the former site of the Nest, which was a football ground used by Crystal Palace F.C. from 1918 to 1924. Selhurst is in Zone 4 of the London Transport Network.

London Bus Route 75 and London Bus Route 157 both run the length of Selhurst Road, terminating at Croydon and Lewisham (75) and Morden and Crystal Palace (157).

== Notable residents ==
- Samuel Coleridge-Taylor (1875–1912), composer, lived at 30 Dagnall Park.

== Gallery ==
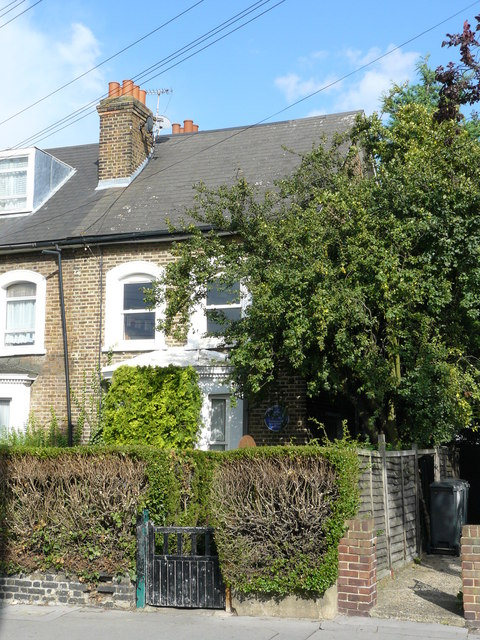
Samuel Coleridge-Taylor's House, Dagnall Park

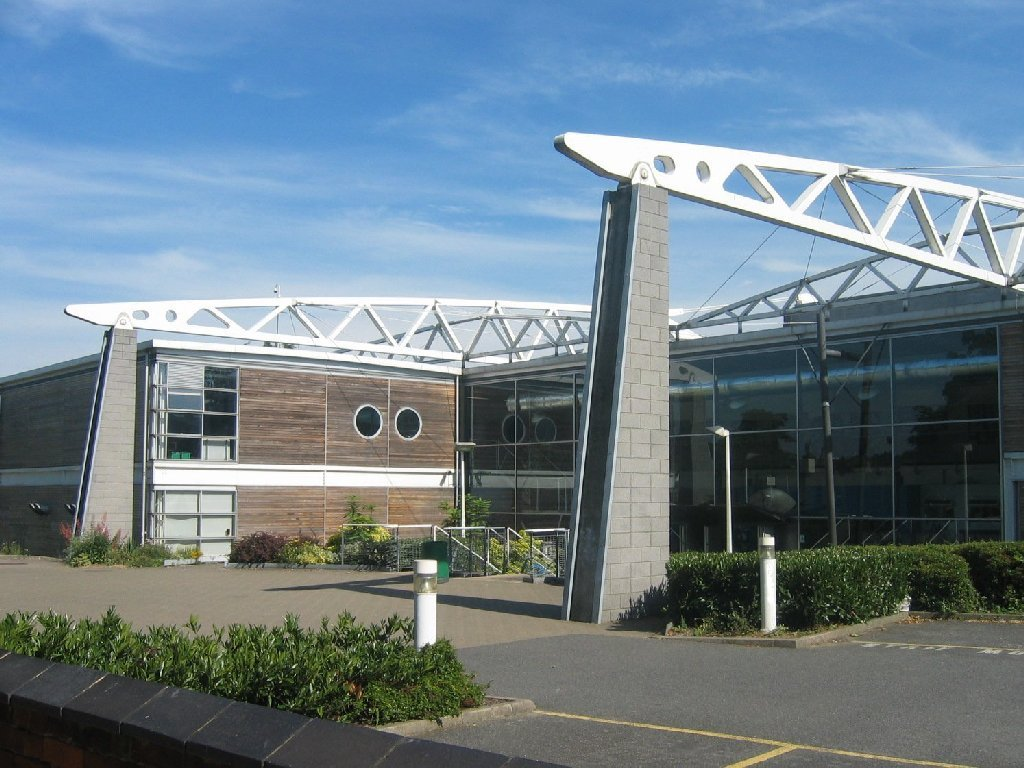
The BRIT School

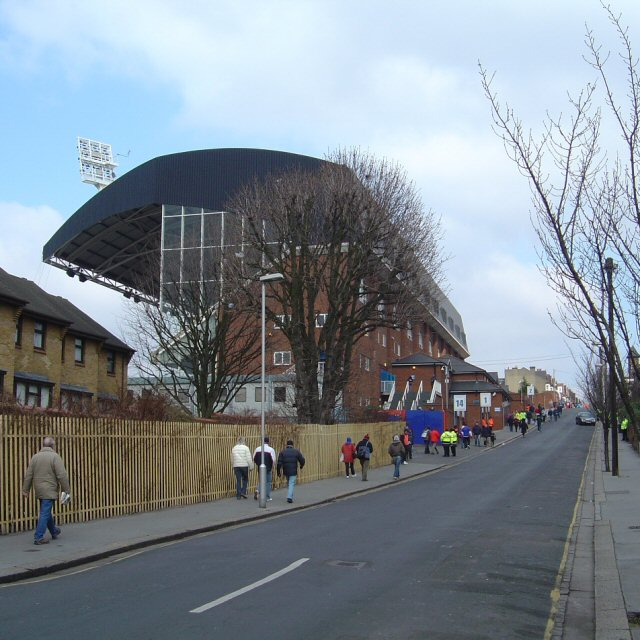
Selhurst Park, home of Crystal Palace F.C.

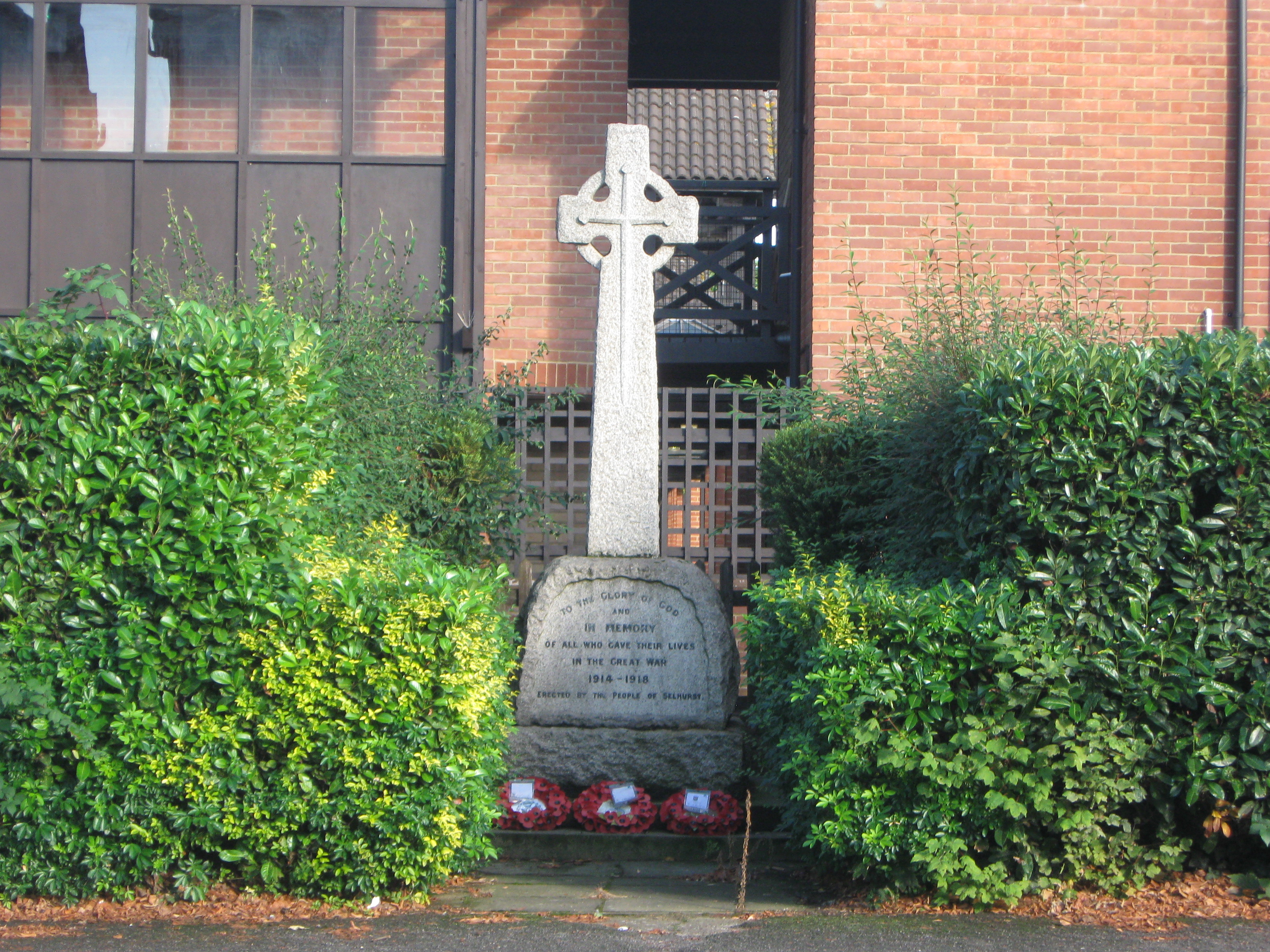
Selhurst War Memorial, a grade II listed structure

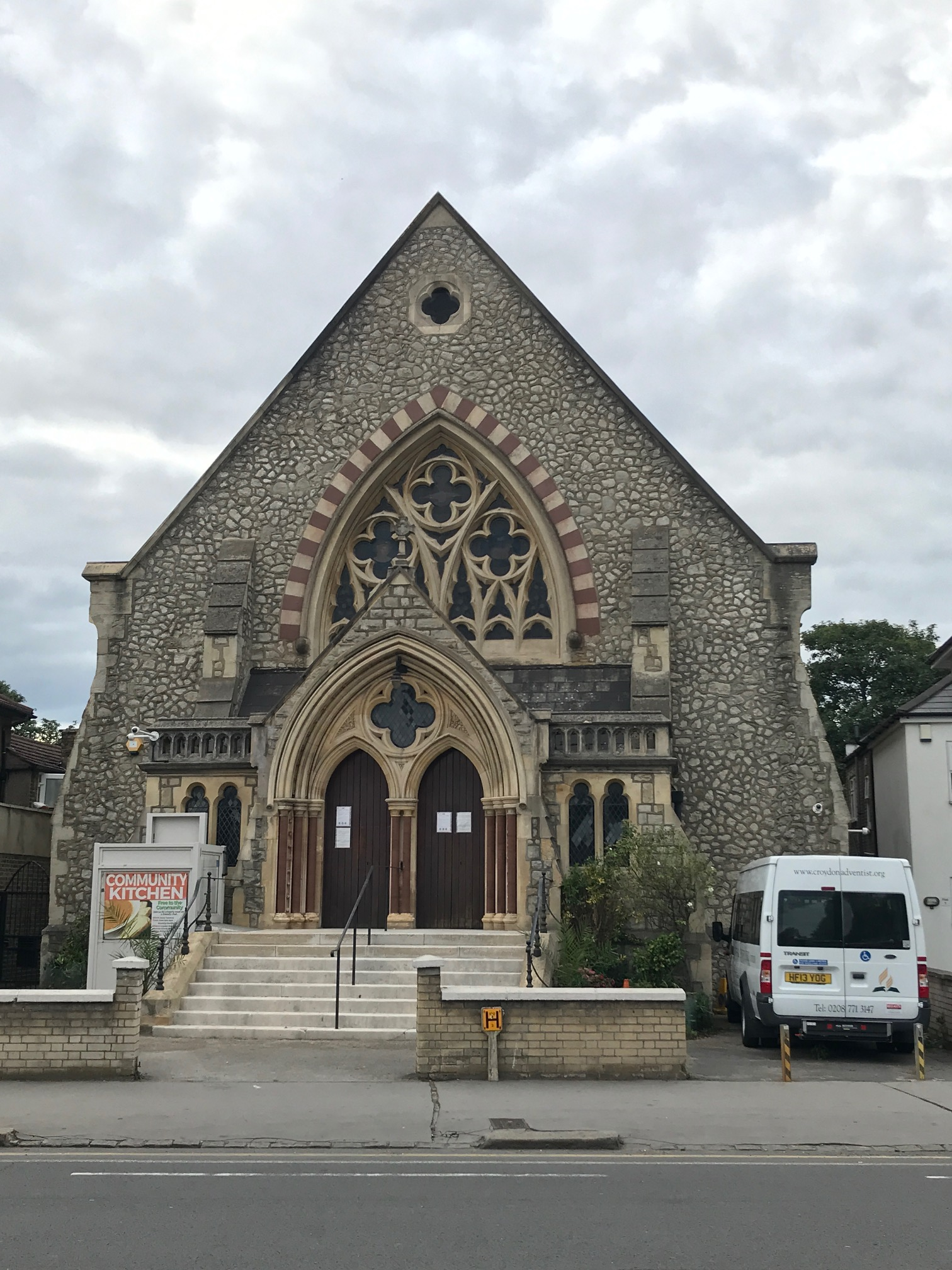
Seventh Day Adventist Church, Selhurst, originally built as a Congregationalist church in 1865

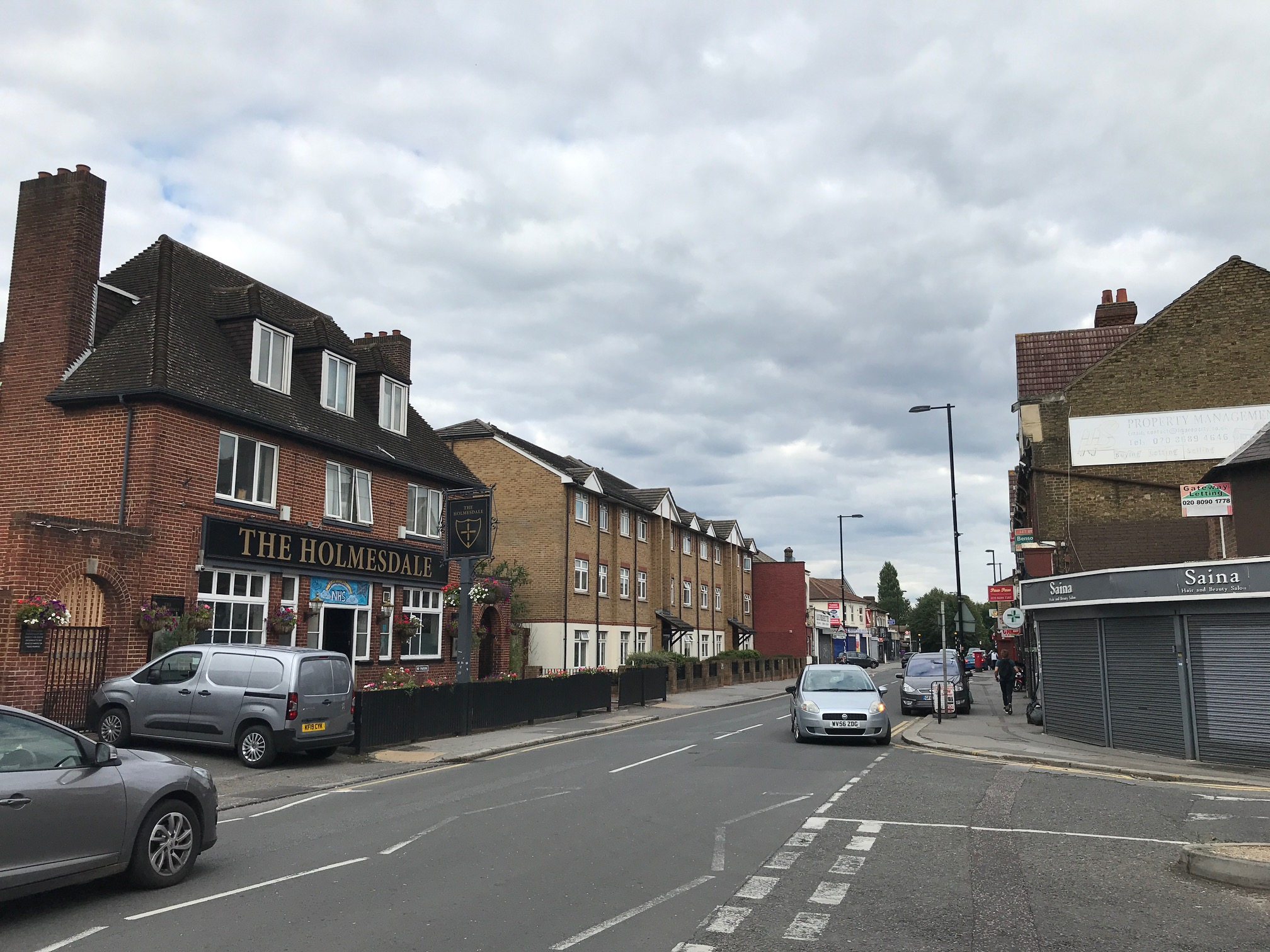
Shops along Northcote Road/Selhurst Road

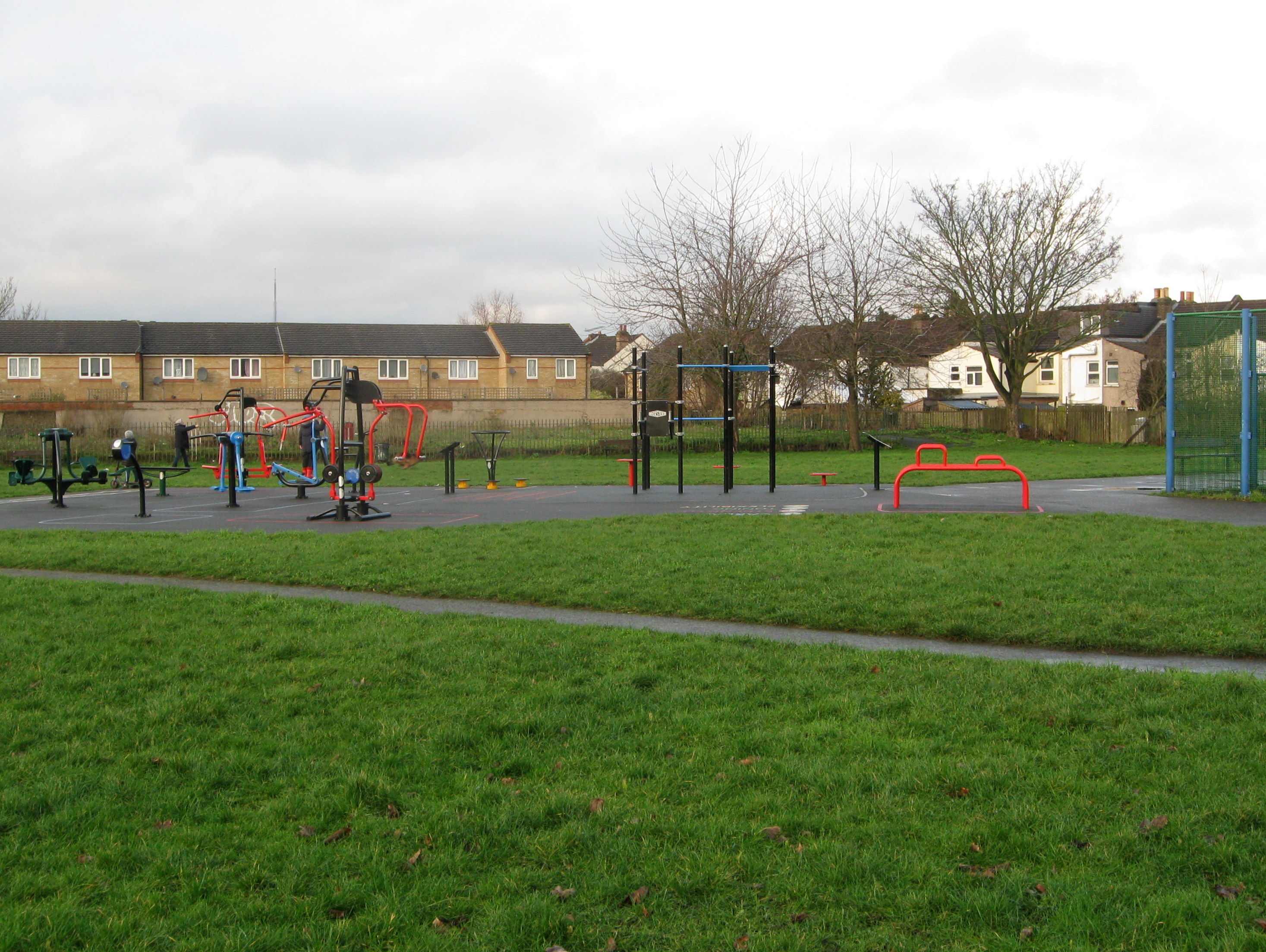
King George's Field
