= South Norwood =

District of south east London, England

Coordinates: 51.3995°N 0.0747°W

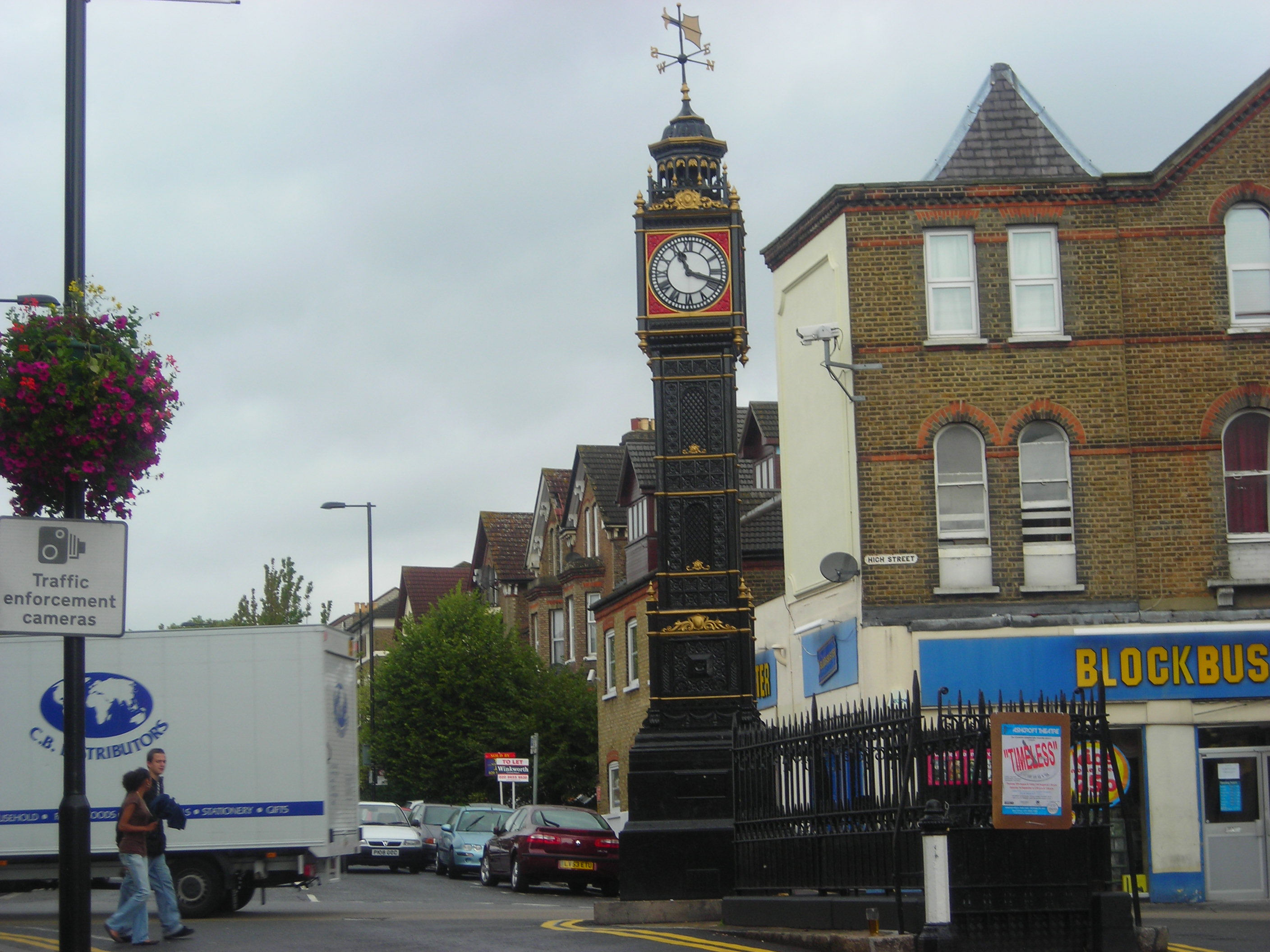
- South Norwood Clock tower in 2007

- Location within Greater London
- Population: 16,518 (South Norwood ward 2011)
- OS grid reference: TQ340684
- London borough: Croydon
- Ceremonial county: Greater London
- Region: London
- Country: England
- Sovereign state: United Kingdom
- Post town: LONDON
- Postcode district: SE25
- Dialling code: 020
- Police: Metropolitan
- Fire: London
- Ambulance: London
- UK Parliament: Croydon East; Croydon West
- London Assembly: Croydon and Sutton

South Norwood is a district of South London, England, within the London Borough of Croydon, Greater London and formerly in the historic county of Surrey. It is located 7.8 miles (12.5 km) south-east of Charing Cross, north of Woodside and Addiscombe, east of Selhurst and Thornton Heath, south of Crystal Palace/Upper Norwood and Anerley, and south-west of Penge.

Together with Norwood New Town, it forms the electoral ward of South Norwood in the local authority of Croydon. The ward as a whole had a resident population in 2001 of just over 14,000.

The south-eastern side of the district is dominated by the 125-acre (0.51 km^{2}) country park which opened in 1989. At the northern end of the town is South Norwood Lake, which was created after the reservoir for the unsuccessful Croydon Canal went out of use. It is used by the Croydon Sailing Club and local anglers who fish for carp, bream and perch.

There are two secondary schools in the area along with a public leisure centre. South Norwood has a high street which forms part of Selhurst Road. It is a commuter district, with many residents travelling to either Croydon or the City of London for employment via Norwood Junction railway station. South Norwood and surrounding areas are covered by the London SE25 postcode, the southernmost London post town.

== History ==
The area was originally covered by the Great North Wood, which was a natural oak forest that covered four miles (6 km) of south London. Apart from South Norwood, the wood covered Upper Norwood, West Norwood (known as Lower Norwood until 1885) and the Woodside and Gipsy Hill areas.

References to rents being paid for a coppice called Cholmerden in the area date to the 1400s. By the 1670s the site had been developed into the grounds of Goat House. Handley's Brickworks' seven chimneys once dominated the landscape of the area. It has been demolished and the site changed into grassland and a lake, called Brickfields Meadow.

The Croydon Canal was constructed in the early 19th century, running from New Cross to the site of West Croydon station. As it passed through South Norwood, pubs sprang up near its course. The Jolly Sailor still stands at the intersection of South Norwood Hill and High Street. The Ship, a few yards to the east, was beside the loading point for bricks from a nearby brick field across what is now the High Street. The passageway through which bricks passed to the canal is still there. The Goat House pub (which has since been demolished) was said to have been named after an island in the canal on which goats were kept.

Jolly-sailor station opened in 1839 by the London and Croydon Railway. It was listed as Jolly-sailor near Beulah Spa on fare lists and timetables and renamed 'Norwood' in 1846. The station was immediately adjacent to a level crossing over Portland Road, making it slightly further north than the site currently occupied by Norwood Junction station. As part of the construction works for the atmospheric-propulsion system, the world's first railway flyover was constructed south of Tennison Road, to carry the new atmospheric-propulsion line over the conventional steam line below. In 1847, the atmospheric propulsion experiment was abandoned.

In 1848 South Norwood remained a small hamlet, however the following 10–20 years rapid development occurred with the construction of roads and the Selhurst Park estate. The area gained its own parish church, Holy Innocents, in 1895. Much of the growth of the area was the result of William Ford Stanley, who constructed a precision instrument factory in the area in 1867 and established a technical school here in 1902 (now the Stanley Halls).

Further development occurred throughout the 20th century with the building of terraced houses and public housing developments. Large numbers of immigrants from the Caribbean settled here and the area retains a large black population.

In 1966, a dog called Pickles discovered, under a bush in Beulah Hill, the FIFA World Cup Jules Rimet Trophy, which had been stolen from an exhibition of rare stamps at Westminster Central Hall.

=== South Norwood today ===
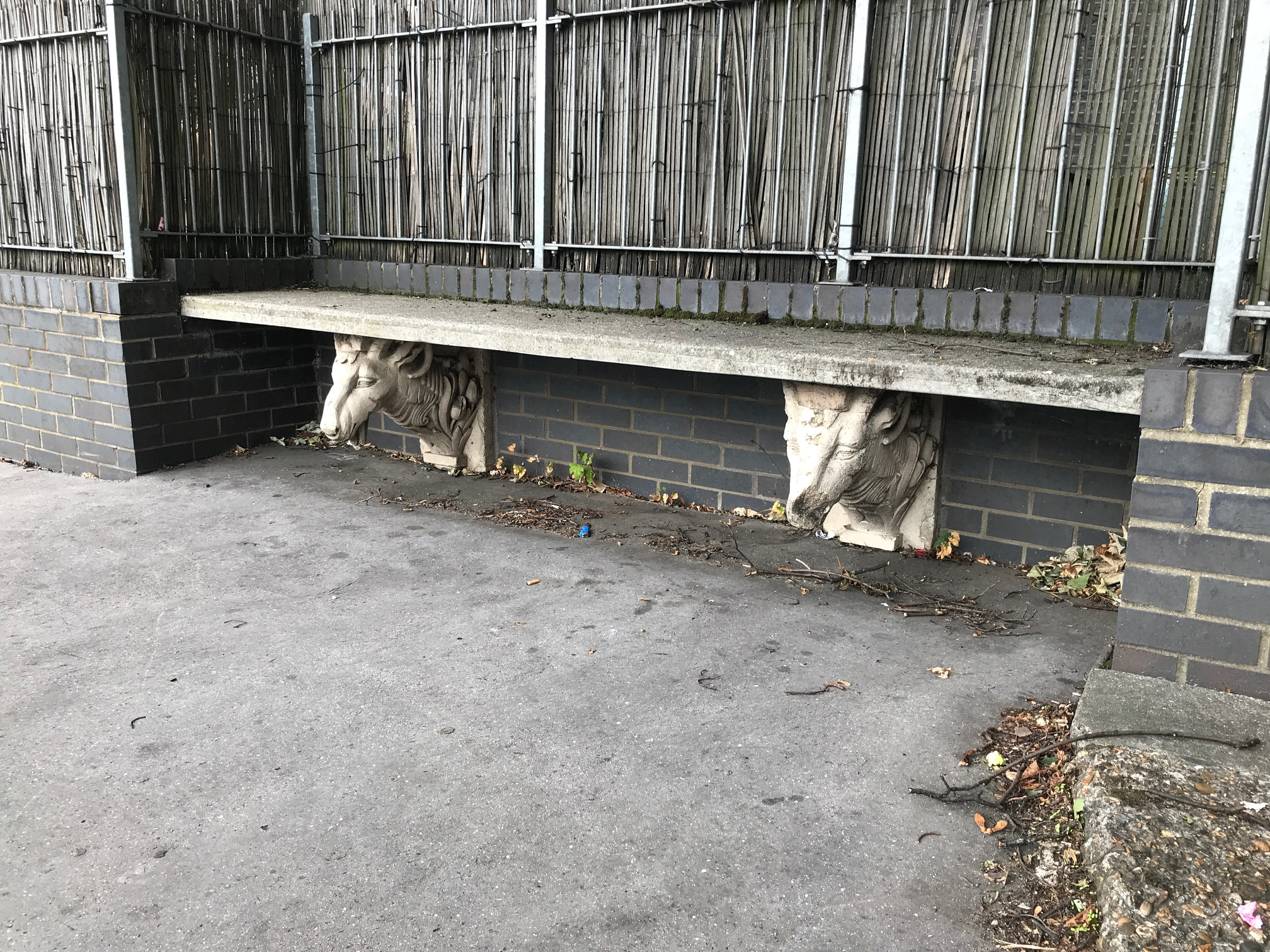
Caprine-themed bench on Goat House Bridge

The area is centred on the junction where the High Street meets South Norwood Hill/Portland Road; the bulk of the shops and amenities are located along the High Street and Selhurst Road/Penge Road, with further shops, restaurants etc. lining Portland Road for some distance. South Norwood is now unofficially divided into the less deprived area in the north west side of the railway, which was the location of a private estate, and the generally more deprived area in the north east. In the south east of the borough, where workers for a former brick factory lived, the entrance to the estate was between a pair of pillars, though they have long since been demolished. However the capitals were preserved and now sit on the two brick pillars at the Selhurst Road entrance to South Norwood Recreation Ground.

== Governance ==
South Norwood was within the County Borough of Croydon until 1965 when, following the enactment of the London Government Act 1963, it became part the local government of Greater London. The town is now in the London Borough of Croydon, which has the responsibility for providing services such as education, refuse collection, and tourism.

South Norwood is represented on Croydon Council by South Norwood ward, a part of the Croydon East parliamentary constituency, and Woodside ward, which is divided between Croydon East and Croydon West constituencies. The sitting Member of Parliament (MP) for Croydon East is Natasha Irons. The MP for Croydon West is Sarah Jones. Both are members of the Labour Party.

Policing services are provided by the Metropolitan Police via the Croydon Police Station branch in Park Lane, Croydon. The London Fire Brigade provide services for the area and Greater London as a whole; the nearest fire station is at Woodside.

== Geography ==
South Norwood is bordered by Anerley to the north, Selhurst to the south, Woodside due east and Thornton Heath to the west. The northernmost point of South Norwood is at Beaulieu Heights (alternatively spelt Beulah Heights, Beaulah Heights and Beulieu Heights) which contains Beulah Heights Park, overlapping with Upper Norwood and New Town. The northern part of the district is situated on the lower parts of the hill that forms Upper Norwood.

South Norwood lies on the southern slopes of the Norwood Ridge which forms the southern edge of the London Basin. This line of hills runs from north-east to south-west for about three miles (5 km) and rises to approximately 360 feet (110 m) above sea level at its highest point. It is formed by a ridge of grey silty deposits known as London Clay, capped in places with the gravel of the Claygate Beds. Because of this gravel working was an important local industry and at one time the road along Beulah Hill was called Gravel Pit Road. South Norwood Hill is the most southerly spur of this ridge and the London Clay extends at its foot to the southern edge of the South Norwood Country Park. Here a brook marks the junction with the sands and gravels of the Blackheath Beds that rise to Shirley, Addington Hills and Croham Hurst. Streams join Chaffinch Brook and the Beck to form the River Pool, which eventually flows into the River Ravensbourne.

== Education ==
=== Primary Schools ===
There are several primary schools in the South Norwood area including Priory Special School, Heavers Farm Primary School, South Norwood Primary School, Cypress Junior School and Cypress Infant School, St. Chad's Roman Catholic Primary School, St. Mark's Primary School and Oasis Academy Ryelands.

=== Secondary Schools ===
The former Stanley Technical High School (the legacy of local inventor and engineer William Stanley) has been replaced and turned into an academy as part of the Harris Federation. After deliberations with local residents it was originally going to be called Harris at Stanley, but the federation changed it to Harris Academy South Norwood, an act which created some controversy. Many local residents were upset that the name Stanley was removed from the school, as Stanley, who had the original school built in 1907, is a famous and well regarded figure in South Norwood. Harris City Academy Crystal Palace is a city academy in the north west of South Norwood, but to avoid confusion with the other school it uses the Crystal Palace name. Other secondary schools in the area include Oasis Academy Arena.

=== Higher Education ===
South Norwood is home of Spurgeon's College, a world-famous Baptist theological college, since 1923; Spurgeon's is located on South Norwood Hill and currently has some 1,000 students. It is one of only four further education establishments in the borough.

=== South Norwood Library ===
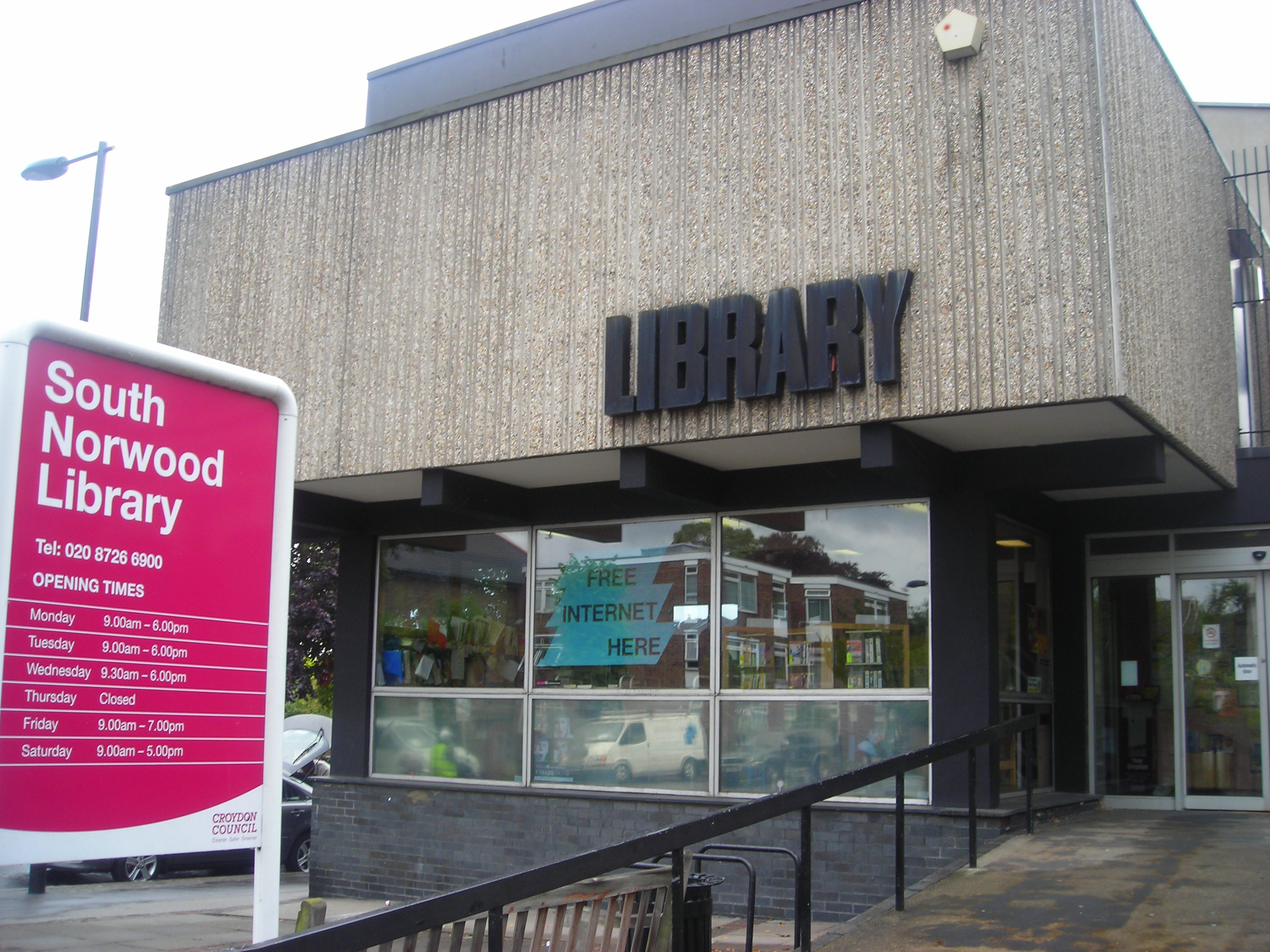
The Brutalist Library designed by architect Hugh Lea in South Norwood

South Norwood Library, nicknamed 'The Brutalist Library' is located on the corner of Selhurst Road and Lawrence Road. A public library part of the Croydon Libraries library system, the building was constructed in 1968 by Croydon borough architect Hugh Lea and is arranged over five levels split across the front and rear of the building in order to maximise the internal space. The front part of the building has the ground floor entrance level, which houses the reception, and the second floor which houses the children's library. The rear of the building has the basement, first and third floors. The levels are offset so that the floors in the front and rear of the building appear like mezzanine levels to each other.

== Sports and leisure ==
=== Leisure Centre ===
South Norwood contains a leisure centre which is owned and maintained by Better on behalf of Sport Croydon. South Norwood Leisure Centre is situated on Portland Road and reopened in late 2007 after refurbishment. It had been closed in early 2006 and was due for demolition, so that it could be redesigned from scratch like the leisure centre in Thornton Heath, at a cost of around £10 million. In May 2006 the Conservatives gained control of Croydon and decided that doing this would cost too much money, so they decided to refurbish the centre instead, although this decision came with controversy. It now includes a 25m swimming pool and a gym.

=== South Norwood Country Park ===
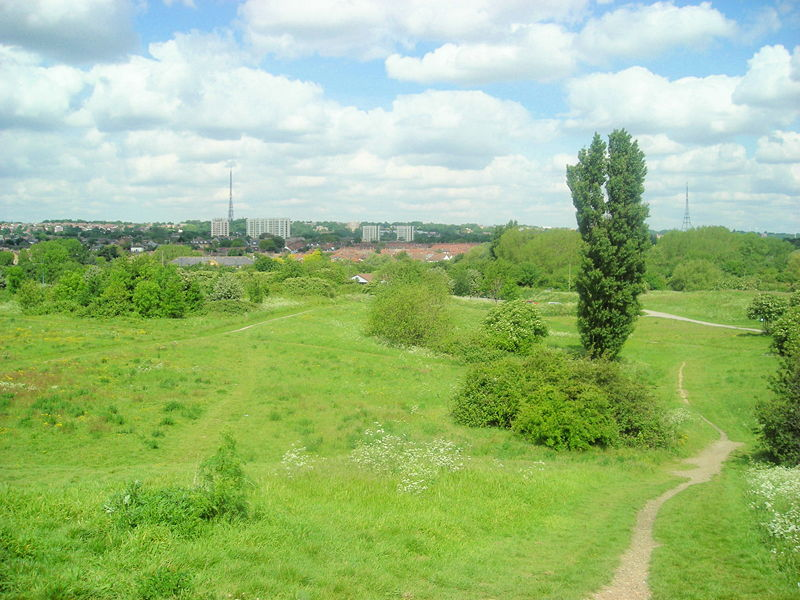
South Norwood Country Park is a nature reserve which is home to an abundance of species and wildlife

South Norwood is also home to South Norwood Country Park, 116 acres of nature reserve. After previously being home to a sewage works (closed in 1966) and fireworks factory; the habitat has been cultivated over time to nurture an abundance of species and wildlife. Other parks in the local area are South Norwood Recreation Ground, Heavers Meadow, Brickfields Meadow, Beaulieu Heights, South Norwood Lake and Grounds, Woodside Green and Ashburton Park.

=== South Norwood Community Festival ===
The South Norwood Community Festival is an annual event at South Norwood Recreational Ground which first began in 2011 as an inclusive event which would benefit the local community. In 2022 over 8,000 people gathered to enjoy live bands, refreshments, arts and crafts and children's entertainment. The event is run entirely by volunteers and profits are donated to local charities and invested back into the future festival plans. The last festival took place on Sunday, 2 July 2023.

=== Croydon Sports Arena ===
Croydon Sports Arena was first opened in 1953 and is a multiple-use sports arena in South Norwood. The arena is located on the edge of South Norwood Country Park. Facilities include an eight-lane 400m running track, with a centre field and training area for throwing events. The stadium is floodlit. During the winter the inner field becomes a football pitch, home to Croydon F.C. In the summer the stadium is mostly used for athletic events. It is used by athletics clubs Striders of Croydon and Croydon Harriers. The stands in the sports arena can hold up to 388 people. From 2018, the arena is being managed by Greenwich Leisure Limited.

=== Football ===
South Norwood F.C. were an amateur football club who were active in the 1870s and played their home matches at Portland Road.

Premier League club Crystal Palace are based in the nearby Selhurst Park and on match days the pubs on the high street are usually busy with fans and ticket-holders.

== South Norwood Tourist Board ==
South Norwood Tourist Board, an anarchist collective, have organised "PicklesFest" with Dave Corbett, owner of Pickles; challenging the Lake District for their title; and more recently proclaimed the People's Republic of South Norwood and renamed the lake in South Norwood Country Park as Lake Conan after Conan Doyle who lived in South Norwood.

In 2013 South Norwood Tourist Board, in partnership with Crystal Palace Transition Town and the local community created a garden out of some wasteland on A213 near Harris Academy South Norwood. The area is known as Sensible Garden, named after Captain Sensible who attended Stanley Boys School, on the site that is now the Harris Academy. On 26 July 2014, Captain Sensible unveiled 'The Sensible Seat'.

== Culture, music and arts ==
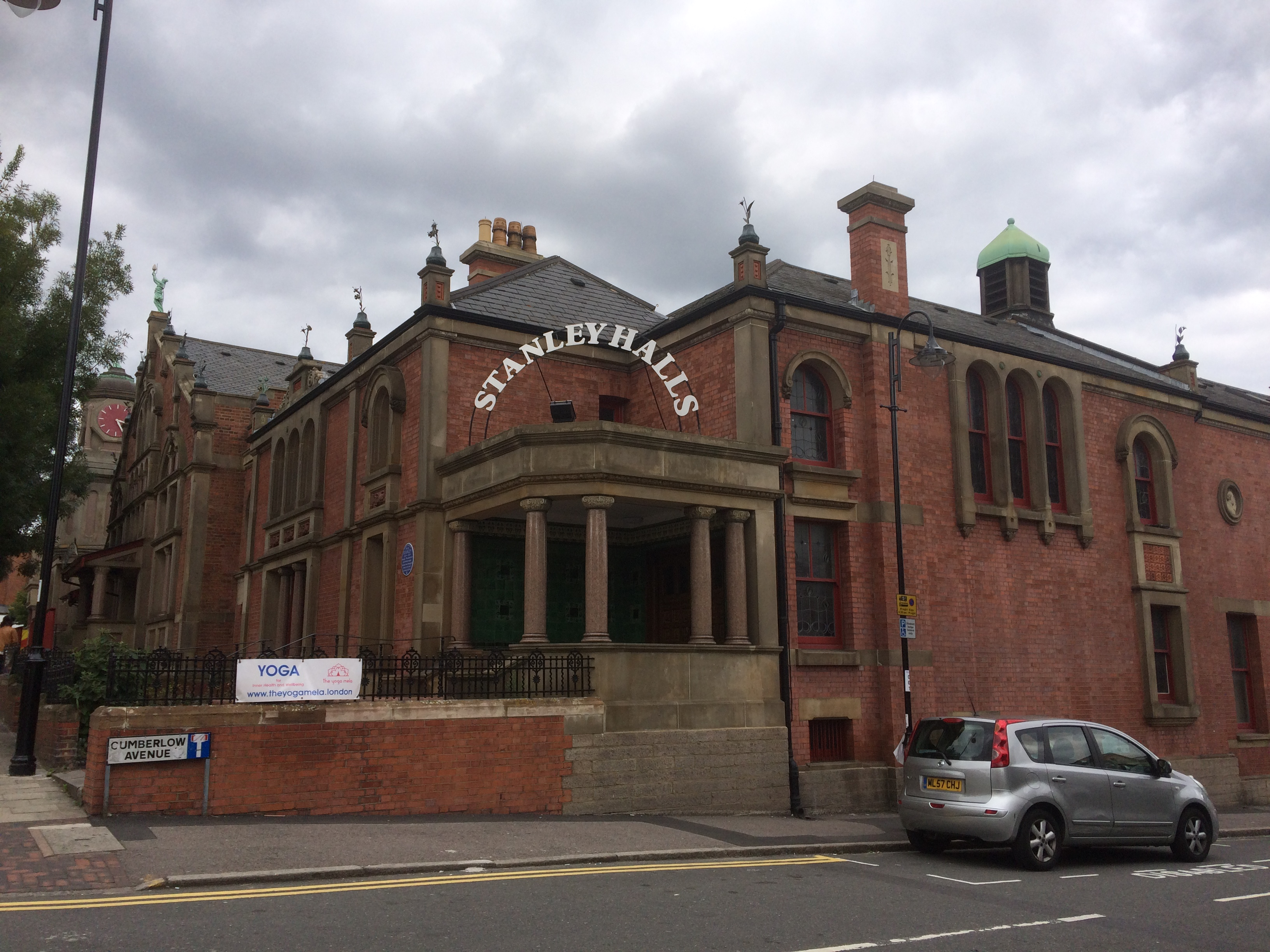
Stanley Arts

=== Stanley Arts ===
Named after the local inventor and engineer who founded and designed the buildings William Stanley, Stanley Arts is one of the larger arts and performance venues in the surrounding area, with a focus on community arts. The organisation's vision focuses on under-represented voices, providing artists of colour and LGBTQ+ creatives with a platform in South London and beyond. The venue is home to a 250-seat and 60-seat theatre space, resident office space for theatre makers, productions from local theatre clubs, a coffee shop, and other community focused activities. Since first opening in 1903, both professional and amateur performers trod its boards; including Samuel Coleridge-Taylor and W.Y. Hurlstone. In the 1960s Shirley Bassey, Matt Munro and Johnny Dankworth were among the professional musicians who rehearsed here for performances at nearby Fairfield Halls in Croydon.

==== History of Stanley Arts ====
Originally named 'Stanley Halls' the venue is a grade II listed building first built in 1903. On its completion, William Stanley invited all the workmen to a supper at the Halls followed by an entertainment to which the wives and relatives of the men were invited. Stanley said that if "the building was not the most beautiful in the world, it was, at least, one of the most substantially built." He hoped that the Halls would become a pleasant home of entertainment for all of them.

The buildings were completed in stages, with Stanley Public Hall (the main hall and art gallery) opening in 1903, the clock tower and Upper Stanley Hall added in 1904 and the Technical Trade School in 1907. The Assembly room and Society Rooms, alongside offices and the venue secretary’s accommodation, were added in 1909 to complete the complex. An inventor rather than a trained architect, Stanley wasn’t interested in following any one architectural style in his designs for the building, resulting in a unique and idiosyncratic combination of styles and materials described by the architecture historian Nikolaus Pevsner as 'one of the most eccentric efforts anywhere at a do-it-yourself freestyle.'

Standing next to Stanley's new technical trade school, which was inspired by the German Gewerbeschulen trade schools and was the first of its kind in Britain, the Stanley Halls complex became a venue for both educational and cultural events. Initially the Halls hosted a wide array of educational classes, exhibitions and political debates. On 2 March 1912, for example, it was reported that "a spirited debate on Votes for Women" took place at Stanley Upper Hall where Alice Abadam (president of the National Women's Suffrage Society and resident of Upper Norwood) spoke in favour of women's right to vote.

==== Stanley Arts - community and social events ====
During the War Years, first aid courses are thought to have taken place here and the building may have been used as temporary shelter for residents bombed out of their homes. It was also a centre for community celebrations and festivals such as the 1951 Festival of Britain and the coronation of Elizabeth II in 1953. Records from the 1950s show that social events in the Halls ranged from birthday celebrations, antique fairs, ‘Meet a Mum’ jumble sales, weddings, aerobics, to a Psychic Festival. The fact that the Halls offered a multi-purpose community venue played a significant role in the promotion of local citizenship and civic pride in the post-war period.

==== Stanley Arts from 1970s onwards ====
As the decades progressed, without a separate cultural identity and no physical separation, the upper and main halls, the gallery and the assembly rooms, all increasingly became part of the expanding Technical school; known locally simply as Stanley Tech. Though the buildings were used to some extent outside of school hours, the record of separate cultural activity in this period is limited, and to all intents and purposes Stanley Halls and Stanley Tech were the same place. By the turn of the 21st century, the Technical School, which had by then seen better days, was being absorbed into the Harris Academy chain; and a new school complex was being built on an L-shaped site around the back of Stanley Halls. In 2007 the newly-opened Harris Academy South Norwood comprised the old Technical School building, the Upper Stanley Hall & Clocktower, and a modern new-build school site stretching around behind Stanley Halls. The rest of the historic Stanley Halls complex, including the main Stanley Hall and gallery, and the assembly & society rooms, were separated from the Upper Hall with a new internal wall that divided the Stanley Halls complex in two.

Over the next five years the future of the larger, lower half, the ‘unneeded’ part of the Stanley Halls complex as it was seen by the developers of the new school academy, was in question. With these remaining buildings under threat, and competing visions for their future, the local community came together to apply to take them on from Croydon Council as a community asset transfer.

In 2015 the buildings were finally signed over to the newly-formed Stanley People’s Initiative, a charity established to save this part the historic Stanley Halls complex, and hopefully to find a new use for this extraordinary set of buildings. Over the first few years of operation this new, reduced, Stanley Halls slowly found its feet; and with it, a renewed sense of purpose. Paradoxically, the pandemic of 2020 helped to re-establish the buildings in the hearts and minds of local people as an essential home for art, performance and community.

This new purpose represents a return to the original intention of William Stanley. In 1901 he had conceived the idea of building a local home for entertainment, art and culture, and nearly 120 years later his vision was to be renewed. The start of 2021 saw the trustees launch a new identity for this part of the historic Stanley Halls complex, rebranding as Stanley Arts – a name that honours the past, whilst looking forward to a brighter future. Stanley Arts seeks to forge a new identity for this part of Stanley Halls, separate from its most recent history as part of Stanley Tech, and one that clearly defines the future of this building as a South London home for community, arts, and culture for the next 120 years at least.

== Transport ==
=== Roads ===
Two A roads, the A215 and the A213 are in the South Norwood area. The A213 is High Street, Penge Road and Selhurst Road. The A215 is Portland Road and South Norwood Hill.

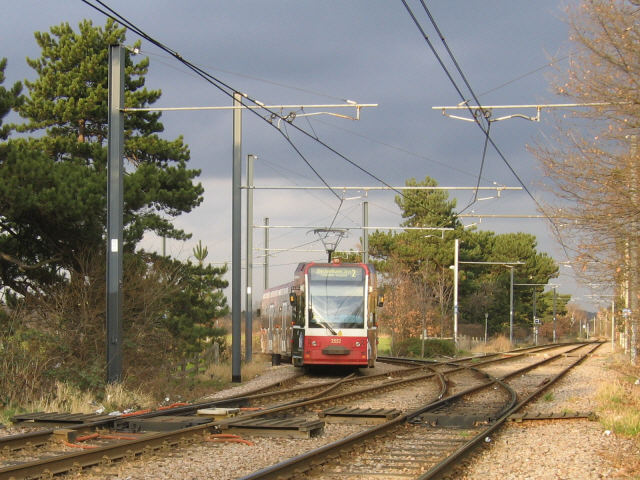
The junction to the north of Arena. This tram is entering South Norwood Country Park.

=== Rail ===
Norwood Junction railway station is situated in the centre of South Norwood just off High Street. It has 7 platforms but only 6 are in use at the present time. Southern and London Overground's Windrush line trains run to London Bridge and Highbury & Islington. Fast trains generally take 10 minutes to reach central London and slow trains 30 minutes. Also London Victoria station trains take 20 minutes. East Croydon and West Croydon stations and urban and rural stations thereafter including regular train service to Clapham Junction, Wandsworth Common, Balham and Streaham. Selhurst station is nearby, from which one can catch direct trains to Kensington Olympia and Shepherd's Bush via a train service to Milton Keynes.

The Thameslink Programme (formerly known as Thameslink 2000), is a £3.5 billion major project to expand the Thameslink network from 51 to 172 stations spreading northwards to Bedford, Peterborough, Cambridge and King's Lynn and southwards to Guildford, Eastbourne, Horsham, Hove to Littlehampton, East Grinstead, Ashford and Dartford. The project includes the lengthening of platforms, station remodelling, new railway infrastructure (e.g. viaduct) and additional rolling stock. The new Thameslink timetable for Norwood Junction started 20 May 2018: "Norwood Junction gain[ed] an all-day-long Thameslink service to Bedford via Blackfriars and St Pancras, with two trains per hour to Epsom via Sutton" and timetables will continue being expanded and adjusted into 2019.

Transport for London began work on the southern extension of the East London line in 2005 as part of the London Overground. On completion in May 2010, services run between West Croydon and Dalston Junction via London Docklands. It is now part of the Windrush line.

=== Trams ===
Trams do not run through the town centre of South Norwood, with the nearest stops on the Tramlink network being Harrington Road, Arena and Woodside. In the mid-2000s there were proposals for an extension to Crystal Palace, which would have resulted in the construction of an additional stop on Penge Road.

=== Bus ===
Buses in South Norwood are run by Transport for London (TfL).

== Notable people ==
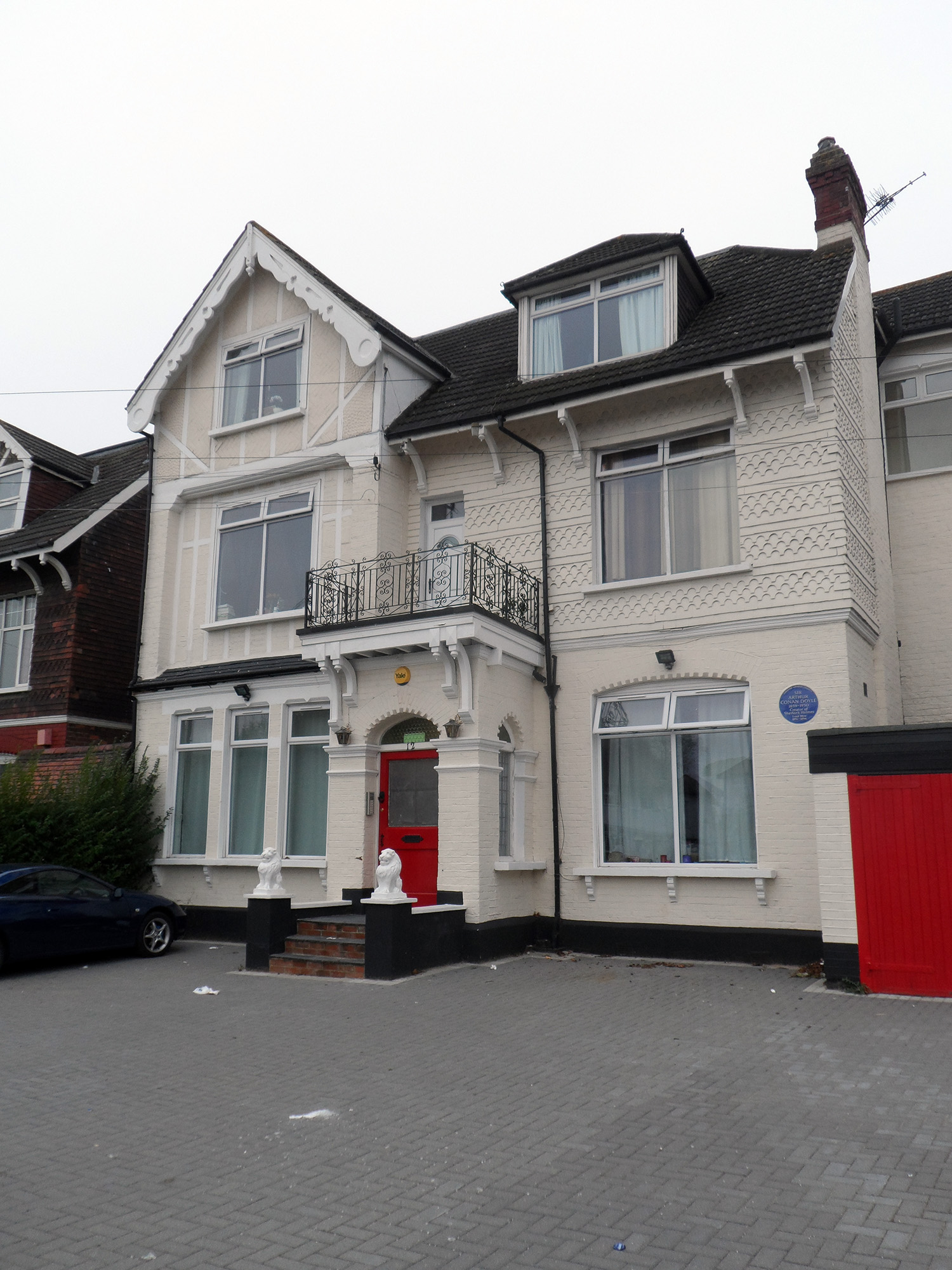
12 Tennison Road

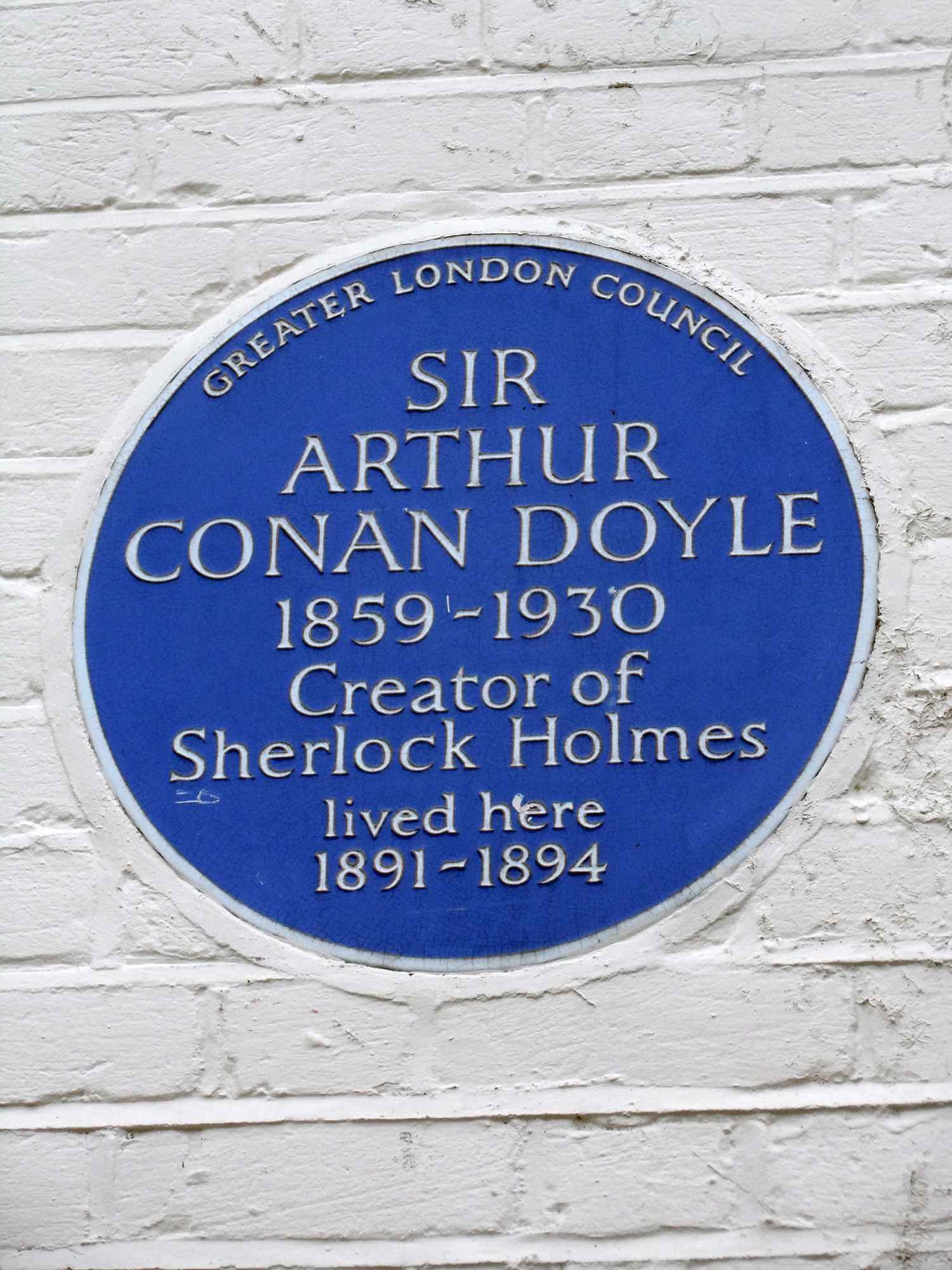
Close-up of plaque

12 Tennison Road, former home of Sir Arthur Conan Doyle
- Edward Vernon Arnold, Indologist and Classical scholar, born 1857 in South Norwood, where his father was Vicar of St. Mark's Church.
- Hannah Arterton – actress, lives in South Norwood.
- Lionel Atwill (1885–1946) – actor, was born, and spent the early part of his childhood, at 2 Upton Villas, Albert Road.
- Alex Beckett (1982–2018) – actor, lived and died in South Norwood.
- Mary Bell – child murderer. The murders of two young boys was committed in Newcastle when she was 10 and 11. For a time, Bell lived in a girls' remand home at Cumberlow Lodge in South Norwood, off of Chalfont Road behind Stanley Halls.
- Roy Budd (14 March 1947 – 7 August 1993), musician
- Captain Sensible – musician, attended school here.
- Samuel Coleridge-Taylor (15 August 1875 – 1 September 1912) was an English composer and conductor. Of mixed race birth (his father was a doctor from Sierra Leone), Coleridge-Taylor achieved such success that he was referred to by New York musicians as the "African Mahler" when he had three tours of the United States in the early 1900s. There are two blue plaques in his memory, one in Dagnall Park, South Norwood, and the other in St Leonards Road, Croydon, at the house where he died.
- Margaret Chute (1886–1948) – stage actor, suffragist, freelance Hollywood journalist and photographer born in South Norwood.
- Arthur Conan Doyle (1859–1930) – author, lived at 12 Tennison Road in South Norwood, from 1891 to 1894 (commemorated with a blue plaque). Contrary to popular belief, he did not use the area as the setting for the Sherlock Holmes short story "The Adventure of the Norwood Builder" (1903). This story, for the most part, takes place in Lower Norwood (today known as West Norwood). The only connection between this story and South Norwood is that South Norwood's railway station Norwood Junction is used by the character Jonas Oldacre. The NatWest Bank on South Norwood High Street was, in Victorian times until the mid-1980s, the local police station and is the most likely candidate for the police station mentioned in the second Sherlock Holmes novel, The Sign of the Four (1890).
- Peter Grant (1935–1995) – music manager, most notably for Led Zeppelin, born and grew up in South Norwood.
- William Stanley (1829–1909) – inventor and architect, set up a technical institute and factory in the area.
- Stormzy – rapper, grew up in South Norwood.
- William Walker (1869–1918) – diver, most notable for shoring up Winchester Cathedral and thereby saving it from collapse. Lived at 118 Portland Road (commemorated with a plaque).
- Ellen E Ciss Wright – athlete, All England 440 yards champion, lived at 6 Clifford Road; a plaque on the Portland Road leisure centre commemorates her.
