= Sanderstead Court =

Former country house in England

Coordinates: 51.336°N 0.073°W

Sanderstead Court in the early 1800s

Sanderstead Court was a country house in Sanderstead, Surrey, England, dating from at least the 17th century. It was destroyed by fire in 1944, and its ruins are Grade II listed.

== History ==
The building is located next to the All Saints' Parish Church (c. 1230) in Sanderstead. Sanderstead Court did not appear on the Tithe map of 1844.

In 1675, the house was a three-story, red brick mansion comprising a central core with two large wings at either end which were adorned with decorated chimneys. The central portion of the house had a great room, two stories in height, supported by fluted columns with Corinthian capitals; this great room was probably originally constructed by an earlier Atwood in the 16th century. Many of the rooms in Sanderstead Court were panelled with wood. The Atwood shield with a lion rampant between three acorns, the initials “H.A.” (Harman Atwood) and the date “1675” were once were carved in stone over the main entry to Sanderstead Court.

John Preston Neale described the Sanderstead Court's grounds in 1818 by saying, "The site of the Court House is on an eminence, having in front a spacious lawn, skirted by a shrubbery of rich and varied foliage, separated from the adjoining pleasure grounds by a light range of iron palisades. The Park was enlarged by the addition of an Estate, called Place House; and the whole now forms quite a sequestered residence; the grounds, which are extensive, admit the most beautiful prospects: on one side are seen the counties of Buckinghamshire and Berkshire; and on the other, a fine open country for many miles, over all Bansted Downs" (Neale 1818).

During World War II, it was used by the Royal Air Force. Sanderstead Court burned, leaving only the outside walls in 1944. As of 1947, the mansion was still standing but reduced to ruins. Part of it still remains as a Grade II listed building. The grounds around the house have now been built on. These include Cedar Court (three blocks of apartments) and a new Sanderstead Court (also three blocks of apartments).

Behind the house, was a stable building, this was used by Selsdon Park Golf Club as a clubhouse. But the club later moved to Selsdon Park Hotel. The stables then formed part of the New Sanderstead Court apartments.

== Owners ==
In 1346 Justice Peter Atte Wood (Atte Wode) and his wife Laurencia purchased land there (Lewis 1894, p. 338). Some time in the 15th century they moved to Sanderstead and began improving the property. (Atwood 1928).

The Atwood family were benefactors to the Sanderstead Parish Church which was adjacent to their home, and John Atwood (Atwodde) and his wife, Denys, have a brass plaque in the church dated 1525. John's grand son, Nicholas Wood-Atwood, who died in 1586, is identified as “of Sandersted Corte who served quene Elizabeth sens the second yearr of her rayne” on his brass in the church (Stephanson 1919).

Nicholas Wood lost a portion of Sanderstead Court to Sir John Gresham, Lord Mayor of London. The Atwoods regained control of Sanderstead Court, and Nicholas Wood's son, Harman Atwood Jr., transformed Sanderstead into a more significant country house when he made renovations in 1675. Harman Atwood left Sanderstead Court to his sister Dame Olivia Atwood. Olivia also died and the house passed through a succession of distant Atwood relations until it passed out of the family line entirely in 1759. Later owners included members of the Wigsell family.
