= Selsdon =

Village in South London, England

Coordinates: 51.3453°N 0.0535°W

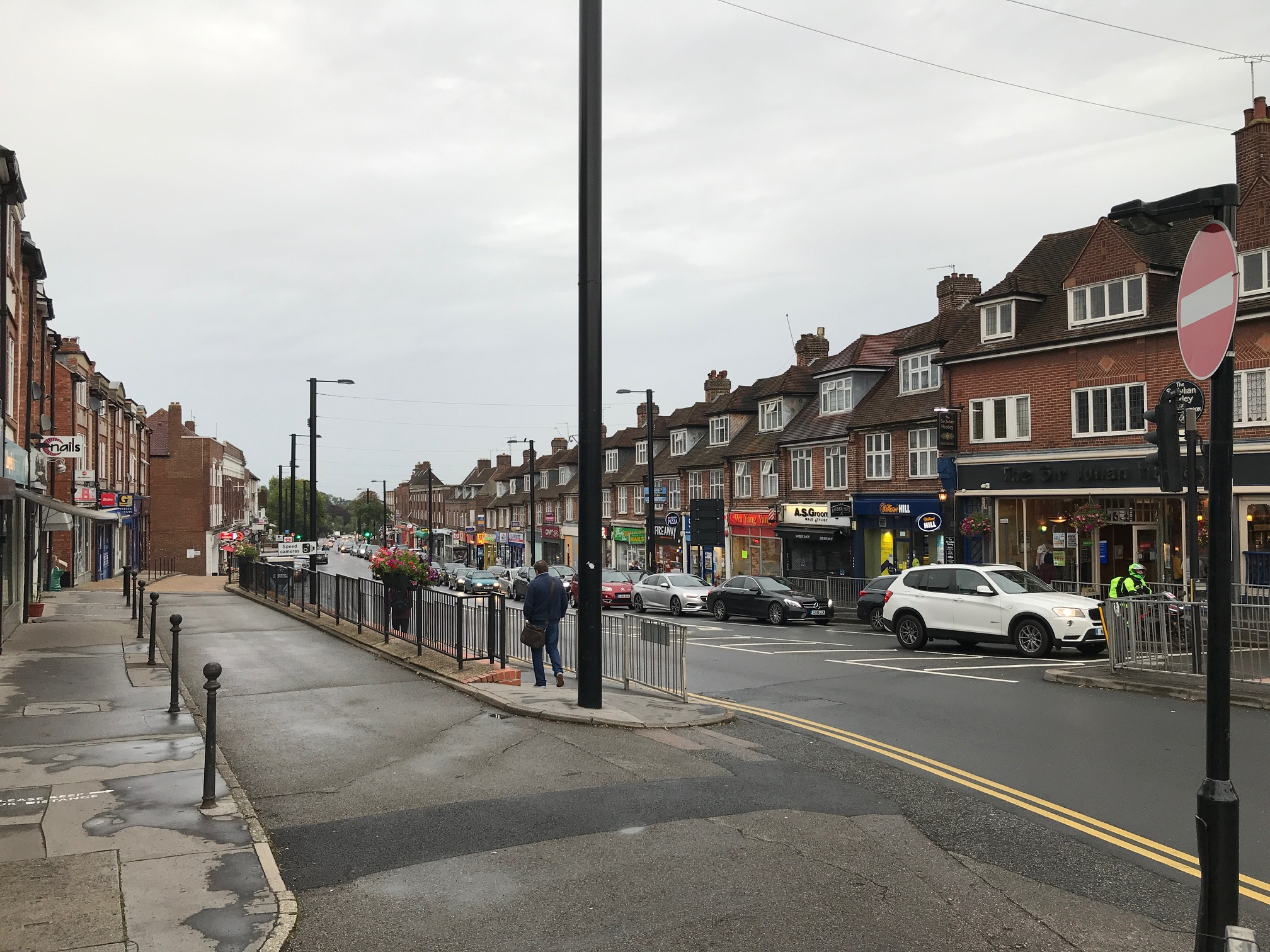
- Shops on Selsdon High Street

- Location within Greater London
- OS grid reference: TQ355625
- London borough: Croydon
- Ceremonial county: Greater London
- Region: London
- Country: England
- Sovereign state: United Kingdom
- Post town: SOUTH CROYDON
- Postcode district: CR2
- Dialling code: 020
- Police: Metropolitan
- Fire: London
- Ambulance: London
- UK Parliament: Croydon South
- London Assembly: Croydon and Sutton

Selsdon is a village in South London, England, located in the London Borough of Croydon, in the ceremonial county of Greater London. Prior to 1965 it was in the historic county of Surrey. It now has the character of a suburb and sits at a high elevation, bordering downland.

== History ==
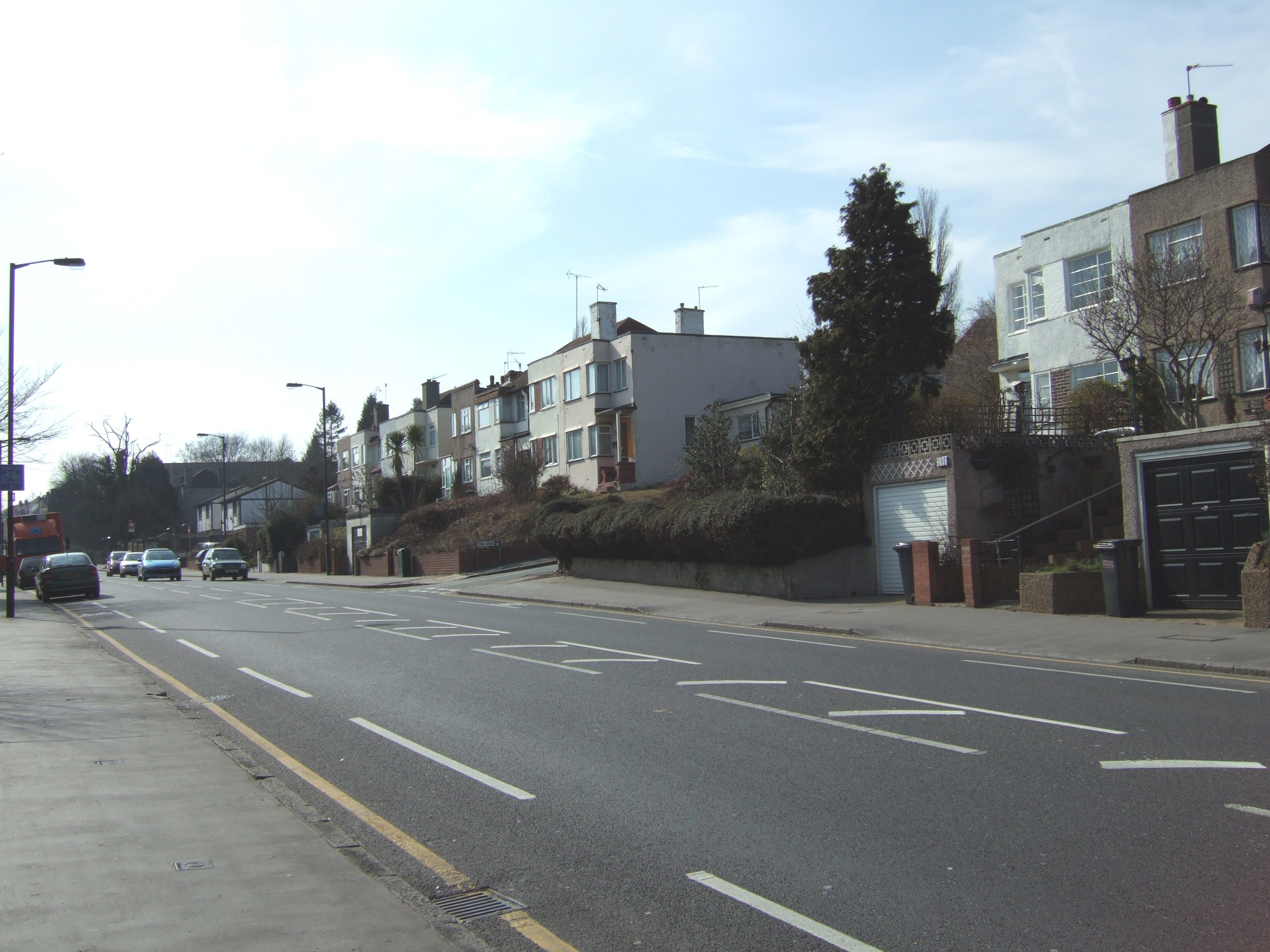
One of several areas of Art Deco houses in Addington Road

Selsdon was historically a rural area; most of it was part of Selsdon Park Estate, once well known as hunting and shooting grounds. It is mentioned in the Domesday book (associated with Sanderstead). George Smith (30 April 1765 – 26 December 1836) MP, banker and a director of the East India Company, bought the freehold in 1810. He transformed the Selsdon farm into a manor house, 'Selsdon Park'. Smith was a great-great-grandfather (through George's granddaughter Frances Bowes-Lyon, Countess of Strathmore and Kinghorne) of Queen Elizabeth the Queen Mother (wife to King George VI), and therefore also ancestor of Queen Elizabeth II and King Charles III. His memorial is in All Saints Church, Sanderstead. Following his family's residence in Selsdon, from 1890 there were two further owners until 1925, when the last 'Squire' died and the manor was sold for development. The house was to become a hotel and golf course (golf course closed and 'rewilded' in 2023) and from 1926 onwards the surrounding farmland began to be developed into what was then known as 'Selsdon Garden Village'.

After concerns were raised about the rapid development of the village, a committee was formed to ensure that an area of 200 acres (0.81 km^{2}) would be set aside and saved for a nature reserve and bird sanctuary. This took over 10 years of public fundraising and became was one of the earliest parts of London's green belt. This opened to the public in 1936 and was given to the National Trust after Coulsdon and Purley Urban District Council and the Corporation of Croydon agreed to manage it jointly. Selsdon Wood now consists of five large meadows surrounded by extensive woodland and ancient hedges, and it retains the character of a historical woodland. Much wildlife may be found in the wooded areas of Selsdon; such as deer, and more recently parakeets. In a similar way, Selsdon's second largest public woodland, Littleheath Woods was also saved by public subscription. Through Selsdon nature Reserve and Littleheath Woods runs the Vanguard Way and the London Loop which are well marked walking trails.

The old Estate mansion had been converted into the Selsdon Park Hotel in 1925. The accompanying golf course was designed by John Henry Taylor. There was also a 25m lido. In 1970 it was the venue of a Conservative Shadow Cabinet meeting to settle the party's manifesto for the impending general election. Labour Party leader Harold Wilson coined the phrase Selsdon Man to describe the free market approach which was agreed, and the Selsdon Group was later formed within the Conservative Party to campaign for its retention.

The Selsdon Resident Association is one of the longest running associations in the UK, formed in 1926. It organises and fundraises for an annual highstreet 'cross street' Christmas light display. The Selsdon Gazette, also organised by the association is a monthly free publication of local news and stories; it has been published since 1946.

Singer Kirsty MacColl grew up in Selsdon and attended local schools. Premiership footballer Wilfried Zaha was a pupil at Selsdon High school (Quest Academy) – the same school where, in 1975, the later England football team manager Roy Hodgson taught PE and English. Supermodel Kate Moss lived on the borders of Selsdon during her childhood (from 1974 to c. 1988). There have also been several famous alumni of Croydon High School, which is based in Selsdon.

== Geography ==
Selsdon sits at an elevation of 150m above sea level. Nearby Sanderstead Plantation (between Selsdon and Sanderstead) has a height of 175m above sea level. The main shopping area of Selsdon is concentrated on Addington Road east of the junction with Farley Road/Old Farleigh Road. It contains a variety of shops, banks, cafes, the local Baptist Church and two pubs (the Sir Julian Huxley and a micro-pub).

In January 2007 the prominent Selsdon Clock, in rustic style with a brushwood motif round its face by Jon Mills, was installed on the Selsdon Triangle, on the plinth of a former public lavatory, in front of the library and Sainsbury's supermarket.

Selsdon Hall is based underneath Sainsbury's supermarket and the library. It is designed to be a hub for the local community. It comprises a hall that can be hired privately and a coffee shop, which is open to all members of the public.

== Transport ==
=== Rail and tram ===
There was a Selsdon railway station, though it was actually two miles from Selsdon (it was originally named Selsdon Road). It was closed in 1983.

East Croydon station is connected to Selsdon by bus. (This station providing access to Gatwick airport, Luton airport, London and the South Coast.) Two smaller stations, Sanderstead and South Croydon are two miles from Selsdon. There are Tramlink stops at Gravel Hill and Coombe Lane, about 1.5 and 2 miles from the town centre respectively.

=== Buses ===
Selsdon is served by London Buses routes 64, 359, 412 and 433 which provide connections to Croydon Town Centre, New Addington, Purley, Croydon University Hospital and Thornton Heath.

It is also served by Metrobus routes 409 and 411 which provide connections to Caterham, Redhill, Godstone, Lingfield and East Grinstead.

== Demography ==
In the 2011 census, Selsdon and Ballards was White or White British (80.1%), Asian or Asian British (10.4%), Black or Black British (5.2%), Mixed/multiple ethnic groups (2.6%), and Other ethnic group (1%). The largest single ethnicity is White British (75.1%).

== See also ==
- John Ruskin College
