= Michael Willett =

Michael Willett may refer to:

- Michael J. Willett (born 1989), American actor and musician
- Michael Willett (cricketer) (1933–2002), English cricketer
