= Peter Atte Wode =

Peter Atte Wode (fl. c. 1325–1382) was a Justice in Eyre for England south of the Trent from 1360–1367.

Atte Wode was probably born in Coulsdon in Surrey (now Greater London) according to Manning and Bray's History of Surrey. The precise date of his birth is not known, but it is presumed to have been sometime before 1325. His father was Geoffrey Atte Wode (Abt 1297–1346), a Serjeant-at-Arms to Edward III and his mother was Anisia. Peter and his wife, Laurencia, had at least one son who was also named Peter Atte Wode (Bef 1363-aft 1384) who was a Knight of the Shire and married Petronilla.

On 15 March 1351 Peter Atte Wode and John De Roulegh along with seven others were appointed as "keepers" to the "joint commission for the peace and for labourers" in Surrey. This commission was formed in several counties in England to provide an enforcement for new laws that had been enacted to regulate labour and provide for peace after the Black Death decimated the population in 1348–49. On 15 September 1351 de Roulegh and Peter Atte Wode were removed from their positions on the commission as a result of complaints of impropriety by fellow commissioners. They were both tried and Peter Atte Wode was found to be innocent of the charges. De Rouglegh, however, was found guilty of extorting money from labourers, sent to prison and fined heavily Ruth Sewill maintains that the Peter Atte Wode described in this court document was from Charlwood, Surrey; however, she does not provide documentation for her claim. No other Atte Wode's from this part of Surrey rose to prominence, so it seems unlikely that her assertion is correct.

Atte Wode became associated with William of Wykeham (1320–1404). His association with Wykeham undoubtedly enhanced his stature and helped increase his wealth. Jean Froissart (1337–1405), the famed chronicler of medieval England and France, says in his Chronicles (1395):

At this time reigned a priest called William of Wykeham. This William of Wykeham was so much in favour with the King of England, that everything was done by him, and nothing was done without him.

Atte Wode was jointly appointed a Justice in Eyre south of the Trent along with Wykeham on 13 July 1361, a position he held until about 1367. The Eyre Court was created to hear cases involving forest law in the Royal Forests of England. Wykeham eventually became the Bishop of Winchester, and was also the Lord Chancellor under both Edward III and Richard II.

William of Wykeham was appointed the King's Commissioner in charge of rebuilding Windsor Castle and Clerk of all the King's Works in his Manors of Henley-on-Thames (Oxfordshire) and Easthampstead (Berkshire). E. F. Atwood has found a reference in the Rotulorum to Peter acquiring a commission to rebuild a portion of Windsor Castle during this period (there is no indication which Rotulorum records were used by Atwood during his research).

The Atte Wodes had been in the employ of King Edward III since at least 1341. By 1346 three members of the Atte Wode family were serving in his royal bodyguard as Sergeants-at-Arms, including his father Geoffrey Atte Wode, his grand father Sir William Atte Wode (who had been knighted by the king), and his uncle Richard Atte Wode. Jesse's Memorials of London describes his grandfather's service to Edward III as Captain of the Guard The London Letter Books describe Richard's role in moving the invasion fleet down the Thames in 1345 during the Hundred Years' War with France. Based on Peter's land transactions after the successful campaign in 1346, the Atte Wodes seem to have acquired a considerable amount of wealth during this time. E. F. Atwood speculates that this family's treasure was gained as a result of the English success during the war. Froissart makes this observation in his Chronicles:

After the battle of Caen "...the Englishmen were lords of the town three days and won great riches, the which they sent by barks and barges to Saint-Saviour by the river of Austrehem, two leagues thence, whereas all their navy lay".

In 1346 Peter Atte Wode and his wife Laurencia recorded the first of many land transactions in Sanderstead in Surrey (now Greater London) and surrounding counties. This would begin a long association with the Atwood family in Sanderstead. While he owned land in several locations (including Woodmansterne acquired in 1360 and Chipstead Manor acquired in 1364), it seems likely that Peter lived at Wood Place in Coulsdon, the ancestral home; in 1350, he was licensed by the Bishop to maintain an oratory (a private chapel) at Wood Place.

The precise date of his death is not known, but on 20 December 1382 Laurencia, now a widow, founded a chantry at Newark Priory (which was dissolved in 1538) and endowed a mass for the soul of Peter Atte Wode.

Peter Atte Wode amassed a sizeable estate during his lifetime as the scattered records demonstrate, and he stands an example of the emerging new class of wealthy land owners in England who were not members of the aristocracy but grew wealthy through their association with the royal family. His ancestors would continue to acquire land, particularly in Surrey, construct the large manor house known as Sanderstead Court which is depicted in Neal's Views, continue serve the royal family in a variety of positions, and also become elected as Knights of the Shire.

== Bibliography ==
- Atwood, Charles (1888), History of the Atwood Family in England and the United States, to which is Appended a History of the Tenney Family
- Atwood, Elijah Francis (1928), Ye Atte Wode Annals, Sisseton, SD: Atwood publishing Co.
- Froissart, Jean (1904), The Chronicles of Froissart, New York: P. F. Collier & Son, Harvard Classics
- Jesse, John Heneage (1847), Literary and Historical Memorials of London, London: R. Bentley
- Lewis, Frank B. (1894), Pedes Finium; or, Fines Relating to the County of Surrey, Guildford: Surrey Archaeological Society
- Malden, H. E., ed. (1912), The Victoria History of the County of Surrey, np: Victoria County History
- Manning, Owen (1804–14), The History and Antiquities of the County of Surrey; Compiled from the best and most authentic historians, valuable records, and manuscripts in the public offices and libraries, and in private hands. With a fac simile copy of Domesday, engraved on thirteen plates. By the late Rev. Owen Manning ... Continued to the present time by William Bray, London: Printed for J. White, by J. Nichols and son
- Neale, John Preston (1818), Views of the Seats of Noblemen and Gentlemen in England, Wales, Scotland and Ireland, London: W. H. Reid
- Putnam, Bertha Haven (1908), The Enforcement of the Statute of Labourers, During the First Decade After the Black Death, 1349–1359, New York: Columbia University
- Sewill, Ruth (1951), The Free Men of Charlwood, np: Rose Garland Press
- Sharpe, Reginald, ed. (1904), Calendar of letter-books of the city of London: 1337–1352, London: Center for Metropolitan History
- Turner, G. J. (1903), The Justices of the Forest South of Trent, vol. 18, The English Historical Review pp. 112–116
