= Selsdon Wood =

Woodland in Croydon, England

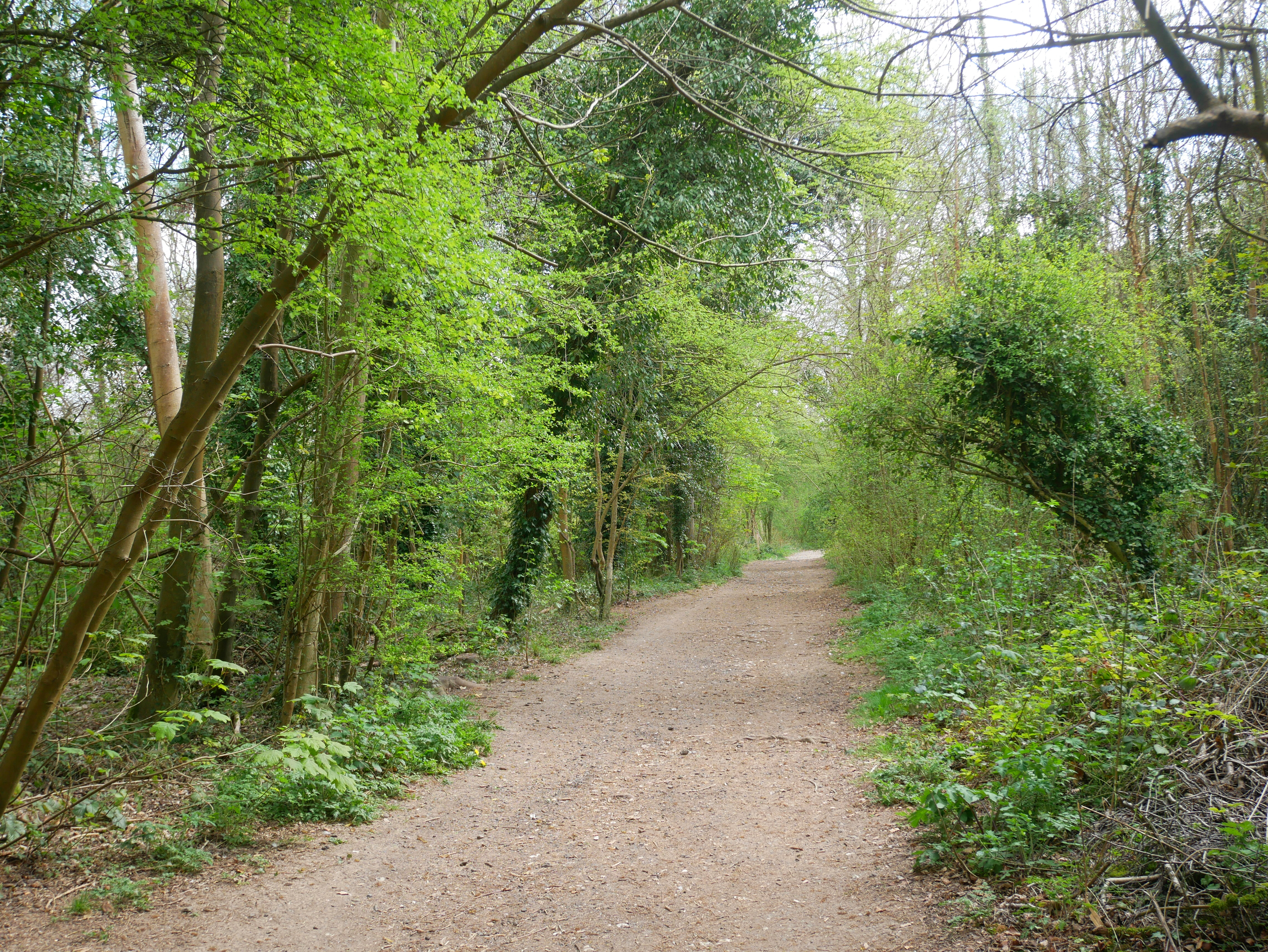
- Path in the Greenhill Shaw area of Selsdon Wood

- Location within Greater London
- Type: Public park
- Location: Selsdon, London
- Coordinates: 51.3383°N 0.0463°W
- Area: 200 acres (81 ha)
- Owner: The National Trust
- Operator: London Borough of Croydon
- Status: Open all year

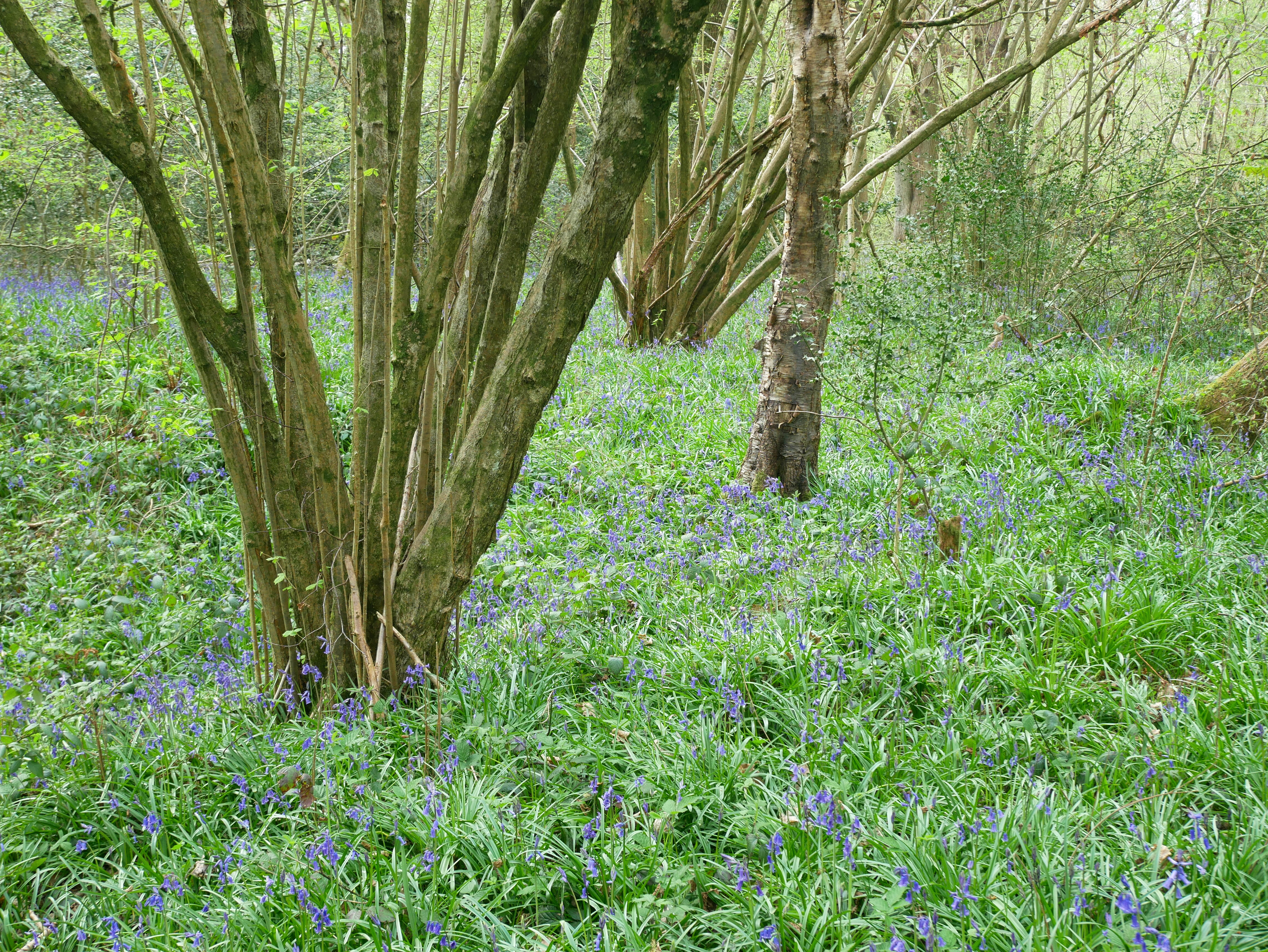
Bluebell carpets in Selsdon Wood nature reserve

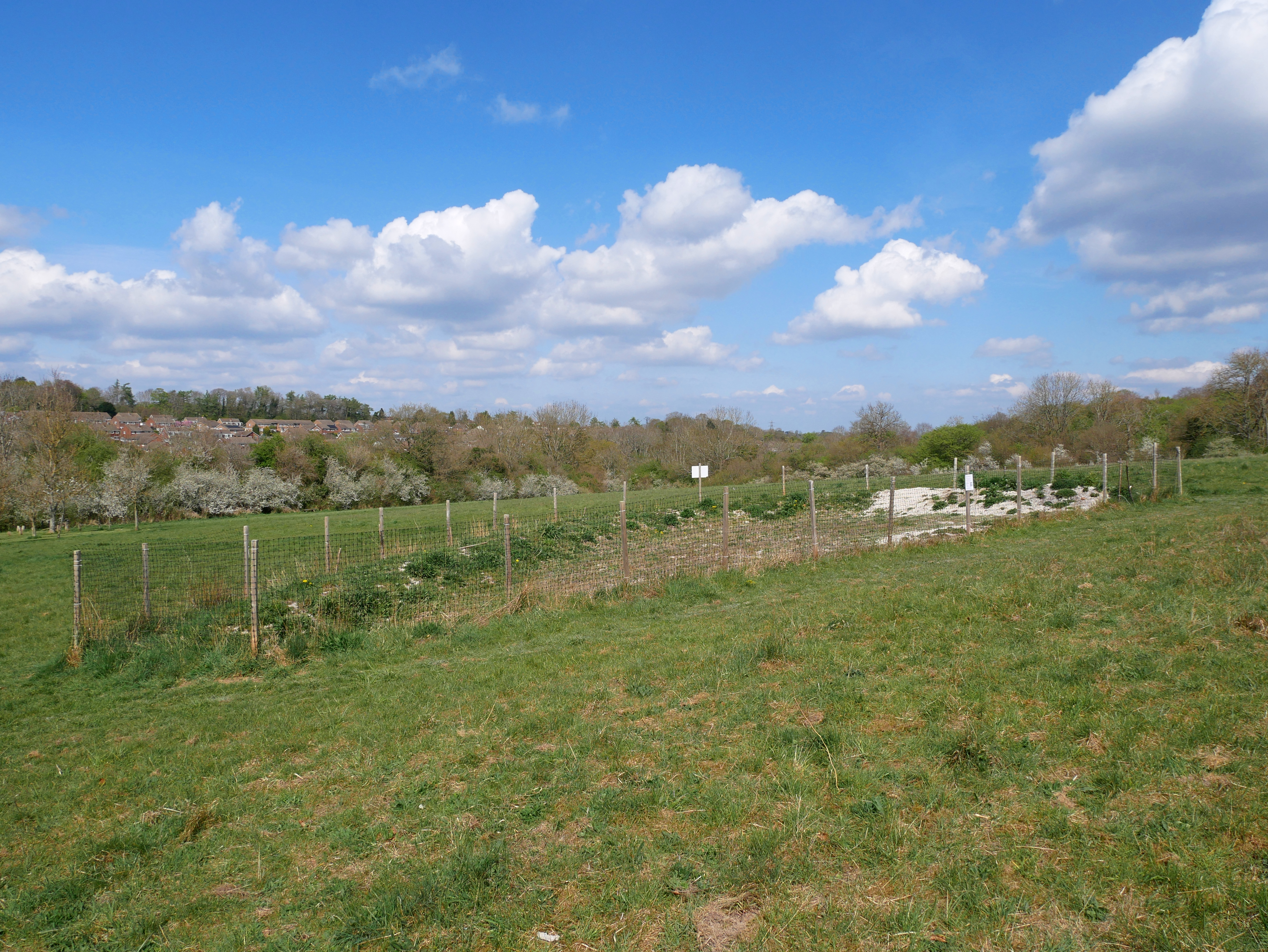
Green Hill, an area of open grassland at the reserve

Selsdon Wood is a woodland area located in the London Borough of Croydon in south London. The park is owned by the National Trust but managed by the London Borough of Croydon. It is a Local Nature Reserve. The wood has a Friends group – the Friends of Selsdon Wood (FSW) – who have their own website.

Following the death of the 'Squire' in 1923 the large private rural estate of Selsdon was to be broken up and developed for housing. A group of five called the 'Selsdon Wood Preservation Scheme' banded to raise public funds to buy and save the area. This took 10 years with appeals in major newspapers of the time.

The five leaders of the Preservation groups were Sir Lawrence Wesley Chubb, Alice Mabel Bonus (niece of Anna Kingsford), Winifred Mary Hudson (sister of Hilda Phoebe Hudson), Ernest Alfred Earl and Malcolm Sharpe (saviour of Croham Hurst).

Sir Julian Huxley (a zoological scientist) was a celebrity supporter of the Selsdon Wood Nature Reserve campaign. It was also supported by the early Royal Society for the Protection of Birds (RSPB), notably Etta Lemon.

In 1988 the first Forestry Show, as it was then called, was held in The Great Field of the wood. The purpose was to show off Croydon Council's new equipment and to explain what actions the Council were taking after the storm of 1987 that had brought down so many trees.

The show continued as an annual event, later called the Country Show, until 2002. Over the years it grew in scale and scope, with livestock even fairground rides and it became product of its own success with attendance in thousands. There were safety concerns over access for emergency services, traffic and parking problems, the risk of damage to the environment from so much heavy equipment and escalating costs so it was decided that there should be no further shows after 2002.

The statuesque bear that stands beside the car park was carved in the first year (1988) as a spectator event during the show. It was carved by a local tree surgeon, Selwyn Smith, who now lives in Wales.

The Wood is part of the London green belt and bounds Farleigh Golf Course and Kings Wood, creating an important wildlife corridor.

== Access ==
Main entrance to the park is off Old Farleigh Road, served by bus stop Selsdon Nature Reserve on Surrey routes 409 and 411; the London Buses route 433 serves nearby Sandpiper Road, while the London Buses route 353 serves Court Wood Lane at the back of the wood. The London Loop path (Section 4 West Wickham Common to Hamsey Green) runs through the park. as does the Vanguard Way. The park is fully accessible at all times.

== Facilities ==
Selsdon Wood facilities include:

- Car park (One bay available for the disabled) at Old Farleigh Road entrance
- Pond
- Public footpaths — including Section 4 of the London LOOP (London Outer Orbital Path); West Wickham Common to Hamsey Green section.
- Includes part of the Vanguard Way
- Seats
- Toilets at Old Farleigh Road entrance (Closed)
- Woodlands and open meadows

== See also ==
- List of Parks and Open Spaces in Croydon
  - Addington Hills
  - Addington Interchange
  - Ashburton Park
  - Brickfields Meadow
  - Woodside Green
  - Littleheath Woods
  - Sanderstead Plantation
  - Queenhill Playspace
  - Hutchinson's Bank
  - Bramley Bank
  - Heathfield
  - Croham Hurst
