= John Doane =

John Doane (c. 1590 – 1685/6) was a politician in English Colonial North America. He arrived in Plymouth Colony on an unknown ship sometime between 1628 and 1632. He served the colonial government as a committee member, deputy for Plymouth, and Assistant Governor in 1632/33. He left government service for a time in the 1630s to serve as deacon in the Plymouth Church.

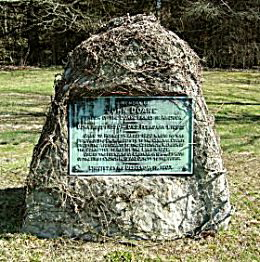
Memorial erected in 1907 by descendants of John Doane.

== English origins ==
John Doane stated he was born in England and in his 1678 will he stated he was about eighty-eight years of age, making his birth year to be about 1590. Nothing else is known of his English ancestry. There is no record of John Doane being in Leiden, Holland, although he was a Plymouth church deacon.

== In Plymouth Colony ==
In 1632/33 he was Assistant Governor.

Records show that on January 2, 1632/33 William Bradford, Myles Standish, John Alden, John Howland, Stephen Hopkins, Samuel Fuller, and John Doane and other notables were ordered by the court to assess taxes on the colonists payable in grain or the equivalent.

1633 was the first year that the records show all seven Governmental Assistants. Edward Winslow as governor and the Assistants were William Bradford, Myles Standish, John Howland, John Alden, John Doane, Stephen Hopkins and William Gilson.

On April 8, 1633, John Doane sold the indenture of Walter Harris - who had bound himself to serve Mr. Atwood of London under command of Mr. John Doane of New Plymouth - to Henry Howland.

On January 2, 1633/34 tax rates were again assessed by the new governor, Thomas Prence, and William Bradford, Myles Standish, John Howland, Stephen Hopkins, John Doane and others associated with colony government. Eighty individuals to be taxed were listed.

Nathaniel Morton wrote that John Cooke, Mr. John Doane and Mr. William Paddy were deacons under Reverend John Reyner, and John Dunham became a deacon later. John Doane was at least a deacon as early as January 2, 1633/34 when he resigned his office as Assistant (governor) because of his deaconship.

In January 1633/34 he was "freed from office" so that he could devote his full-time to church functions.

Per records of the time, Martha Harding died before October 28, 1633, with John Doane presenting her inventory and also was administrator on behalf of her son. She died without a will, leaving one son in the custody of Mr. John Doane and it has been thought she may have Doane's sister.

As early as January 5, 1635/36, John Doane, John Winslow, his brother Kenelm Winslow and others were chosen to assist the governor and council to set rates on goods to be sold and wages to be paid to laborers. The court not only regulated prices, but sometimes quality.

In 1636 Eleanor Billington was fined and sentenced to sit in the stocks and be whipped for slandering John Doane. The Billingtons were Mayflower passengers and had been a troublesome family in the colony since 1620, with her husband John Billington being hanged for murder in 1630.

In October 1636 the General Court appointed William Brewster, John Doane and others as a special committee to join with the governor and Assistants in reviewing all laws and to make commendations for changes at the next court meeting. This committee was one of various committees upon which John Doane served.

On December 30, 1636, John Atwood, late of London, bought John Doane's half-interest in a house and land near Plain Dealing that they had jointly owned.

Per the records of the time, John Doane had a business connection with Mr. John Atwood, who was an Assistant in 1638. John Doane, who became a deacon in the Plymouth Church, was probably a Separatist, for church membership and Separatism went hand in hand.

In the 1640s (undated) records list freemen residing in the area of Nauset on Cape Cod planning to establish a town separate from the control of Plymouth. These freemen included Governor Thomas Prence, Edward Bangs and John Doane, among other notables. John Doane was one of the men appointed to buy land at Nauset from the Indians and later became one of the first settlers there. On March 3, 1644/45 the General Court granted to the Plymouth Church "or those that goe to dwell at Nosett," all the land between sea and sea "from the Purchasors bounds at Naumskeckett to the Hering Brooke at Billingsgate." The court on June 2, 1646, ordered that "Nawsett" be made a township and Samuel Hicks was appointed as constable. (Samuel Hicks was married to John Doane's daughter Lydia.) On June 7, 1651, the court ordered the name of the town of Nauset to be changed to Eastham.

John Doane was very active in colonial government, serving on numerous committees and as a deputy to the Court for Eastham.

Doane was usually given the honorific title of "Mr.", a mark of the gentry, and in one document he referred to himself as "Gent., Tayler".

In other documents John Doane commonly identified himself as "husbandman" or "Yeoman", but in a 1681 deed of land to his daughter Abigail, he listed himself as a "tailor".

== Family ==
Coat of Arms of Samuel Appleton

John Doane married:

1. Ann ____ and had six children. She died on June 1, 1654, and was buried in Cove Burying Ground, Eastham.
2. Lydia ___ by April 1, 1659 and "presumably deceased by December 23, 1681." Her burial place is unknown.

Children of John and Ann Doane:

1. Unknown
2. i. Lydia, b. about 1625. She married Samuel Hicks on September 11, 1645.
3. ii. Abigail, b. Jan. 13, 1631 and died in Norwich, Conn. on Jan. 23, 1734/5. She married Samuel Lothrop in 1690.
4. iii. John, b. about 1635 and died about Mar. 15, 1707/8. He married Hannah Bangs(1644-1677) 30 April 1662

Eastham, Plymouth Colony, British Colonial America.

1. iv. Daniel, b. about 1637 and died Dec. 20, 1712.
2. v. Ephraim, b. about 1642 and died 1700.

In his will dated May 18, 1678, inventory taken May 21, 1686, and sworn by Abigail Doane May 29, 1686, he named his "loving wife," daughter Abigail, sons John, Daniel and Ephraim, and granddaughter Margaret Hicks, and left the remainder of his estate to "all my sons and daughters". He described himself in the will as "aged eighty and eight or there about" and in the inventory he was said to have died February 21, 1685/86, "aged about a hundred years."

== Death and burial ==
John Doane died in Eastham, Massachusetts, on February 21, 1685/6. He was buried in Cove Burying Ground in Eastham where his tombstone is existent as well as memorials in his honor.

== Memorial ==
In 1869 the Doanes erected a memorial stone on the site of Deacon John's house in Eastham, Massachusetts. That site, overlooking Nauset Bay, is now a part of the Cape Cod National Seashore. In 1906, a perpetual lot in the Old Town Cove burial ground, including the grave site of Deacon Daniel Doane, a son, was set aside. The following year a memorial stone with a bronze tablet honoring Deacon John Doane was erected. In 1994 a granite stone and bronze marker commemorating the 350th anniversary of the founding of Nauset was dedicated at the homesite.

In 1936, the Doane Family Association of America was incorporated and remains active. The purpose of the organization is to research and record genealogical data from all sources pertaining to John Doane and his descendants.
