= Lawrence Chubb =

Anglo-Australian environmental campaigner (1873–1948)

Sir Lawrence Wensley Chubb (21 December 1873 – 18 February 1948) was an Anglo-Australian professional Secretary known for his work on environmentalist causes.

== Early life ==
Chubb was born at Lauraville in the Colony of Victoria, the son of Lawrence Wensley Chubb and Esther Lydle Collins. He migrated to England and, in 1891, was working as an auctioneer’s clerk while living with an uncle in Southwark, who was an undertaker.

== Career ==
In 1895, through the influence of Sir Robert Hunter, Chubb became the first Secretary of the newly formed National Trust and was later called "the first man to make what we call the environment his professional career".

Since at least 1906 was the Secretary of the Coal Smoke Abatement society.

A knighthood for Chubb was announced in the 1930 New Year Honours, with the citation noting that he had been Secretary of the Commons and Footpaths Preservation Society for thirty-five years and of the National Playing Fields Association since 1928. The knighthood was conferred by George V at Buckingham Palace on 8 March 1930.

In the late 1930s, Chubb became a Patron of the newly-formed Right Book Club, established to act as a counterbalance to the influential Left Book Club.

He spent ten years (from 1926) helping to raise funds to save 200 acres in Croydon from development to create the Selsdon Nature Reserve, which was initially hoped to be one of the first UK bird sanctuaries. The woods were handed to the National Trust so that they could be preserved forever. Furthermore, in line with his other interests, two popular well-marked walking routes (footpaths) run through the woods: The Vanguard Way and The London Loop.

== Personal life ==
In 1905, at Southwark, Chubb married Gertrude Elizabeth Anthony. With his wife, he had a son, also named Lawrence Wensley Chubb, who became a chemical engineer, and a daughter, Gertrude. In October 1939, Chubb and his wife were living at Windrush, Midford, near Bath.

Chubb died in February 1948 at Richmond, Surrey, leaving an estate valued at £9,144.

A memorial shelter for walkers was placed in his name on Hampstead Heath in 1952.

== Publications ==
- The Maintenance of Public Ways (Commons, Open Spaces and Footpaths Preservation Society, 1946)
