= Sanderstead =

Village in South London, England

Coordinates: 51.3358°N 0.0818°W

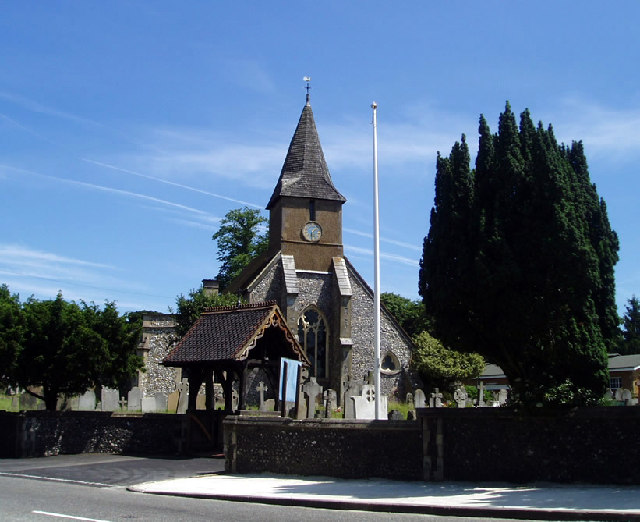
- All Saints' Church, Sanderstead

- Location within Greater London
- Population: 12,777 (2011 Ward)
- OS grid reference: TQ337613
- London borough: Croydon
- Ceremonial county: Greater London
- Region: London
- Country: England
- Sovereign state: United Kingdom
- Post town: SOUTH CROYDON
- Postcode district: CR2
- Dialling code: 020
- Police: Metropolitan
- Fire: London
- Ambulance: London
- UK Parliament: Croydon South
- London Assembly: Croydon and Sutton

Sanderstead /ˈsɑːndərstɛd/ is a village and medieval-founded church parish at the southern end of Croydon in south London, England, within the London Borough of Croydon, and formerly in the historic county of Surrey, until 1965. It takes in Purley Downs and Sanderstead Plantation, an area of woodland that includes the second-highest point in London. Sanderstead sits above a dry valley at the edge of the built-up area of Greater London. Cementing its secular identity from the late 19th century until abolition in 1965 it had a civil parish council. (Note: for the last fifty years of which, the CPC was an inferior body to the Coulsdon and Purley Urban District of Surrey, co-run by Surrey County Council and all of the London Borough of Croydon formed in 1965 lay in the latter county as 1965 saw the county's second major reduction) The community had a smaller farming-centred economy until the mid 19th century.

All Saints' Church's construction began in about 1230 followed by great alterations and affixing of monuments including a poem attributed to John Dryden, the first Poet Laureate nationally; it is protected under UK law as Grade I listed. Sanderstead station is at the foot of the dry valley and has frequent, fast trains to East Croydon, connected to a range of London terminals and interchanges. (Note: Other direct destinations are further from London: East Grinstead and Uckfield) Sanderstead is claimed to an origin of the English Sanders surname, noting at least four separate geographical clusters formed by the 19th century, two of which were by 1881 far more populous.

Sanderstead's Interwar growth coincided with the electrification of the Southern Railway leaving largely a suburban community of households having at least one commuter to central London or Croydon.

== History ==
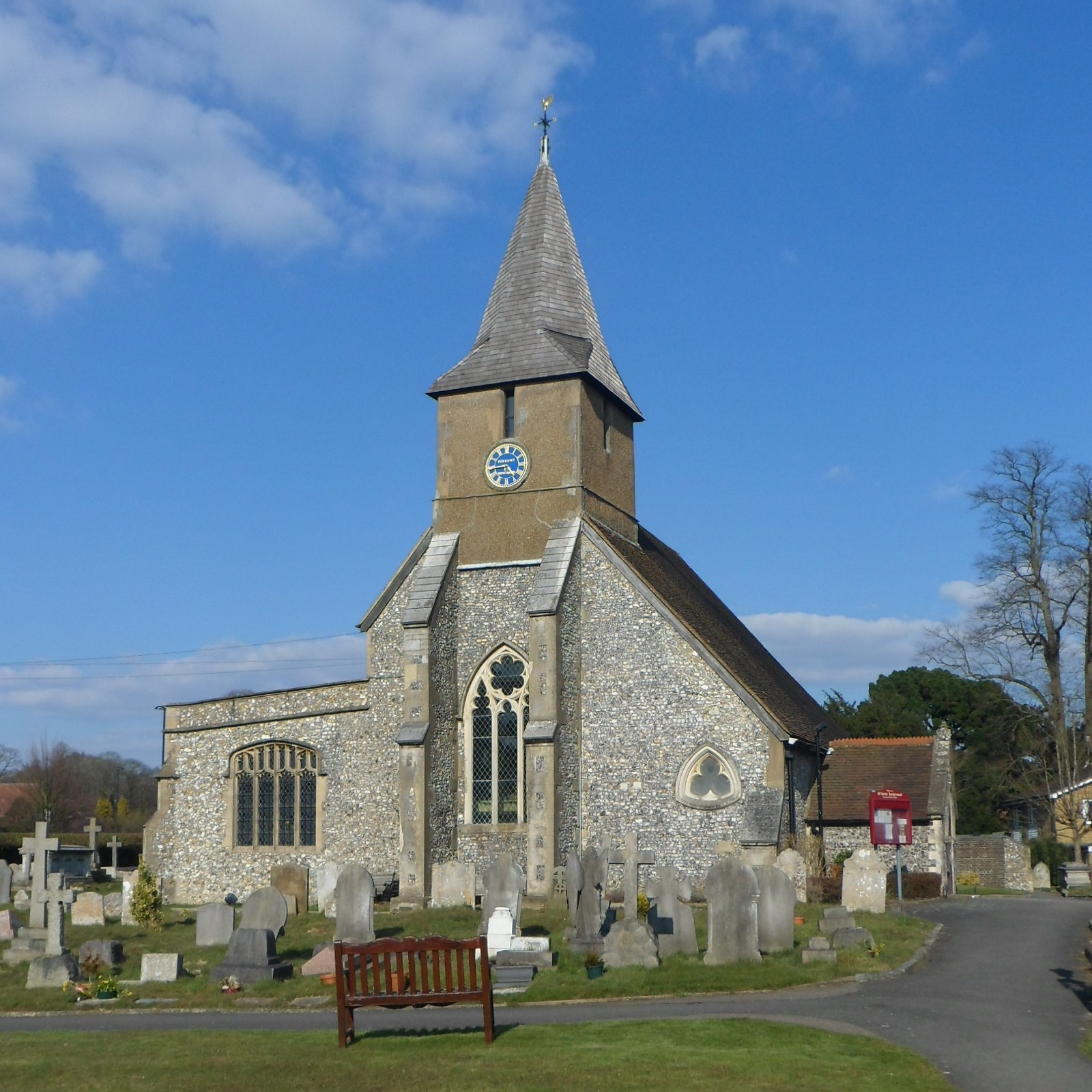
The Grade I listed All Saints' Church, Sanderstead

There is evidence of prehistoric human activity in and around Sanderstead. In 1958–60 the Sanderstead Archaeological Group excavated in the vicinity of Sanderstead pond and revealed the presence of man as far back as the Mesolithic Period nearly 12,000 years ago, as well as pottery fragments dated between 100 AD and 1300 AD and a bronze belt from the end of the Saxon era. North of the village at Croham Hurst, upon a wooded hill, are circular barrows believed to be from a Bronze Age settlement. This is now part of a public open space and the site is marked by a brass monument. A Romano-British homestead (small farming settlement) was discovered during the construction of the Atwood School. During the 1980s, when the school was extended, further excavation revealed the remains of several round huts, hearths, a brooch, and pottery, some of which hailed from North Africa.

An Anglo-Saxon reference to Sanderstead can be found in the will, dated 871, of Alfred, an ealdorman. The village lay within the Anglo-Saxon administrative division of Wallington hundred. It later appears to have been given to St Peter's Abbey, Winchester (Hyde Abbey) by Æthelflæd, the wife of Edgar the Peaceful and mother of Edward the Martyr, where it remained after the Norman Conquest.

Sanderstead appears in the Domesday Book of 1086 as Sandestede, and belonging to St Peter's Abbey, Winchester. It had a noted population (probably of just the adult males) of 26 including 21 villagers, 4 slaves and 1 cottager. Its Domesday assets were assessed as 5 hides, and 10 carucates of arable land. It had 9 ploughs and wood worth 30 hogs. Its Domesday entry records that in the time of Edward the Confessor it was valued at 100 shillings, and now 12 pounds; and yet it produces 15 pounds.

The village was granted to Sir John Gresham by Henry VIII following the Dissolution of the Monasteries. It was passed to his son Richard who subsequently sold it to John Ownsted, the transfer being ratified in 1591. Ownsted died without issue in 1600, and devised his estates to his two sisters and cousin Harman Atwood, with Atwood subsequently purchasing the shares of his joint legatees. The Atwood family had a long association with Sanderstead, with inscriptions at the local church indicating a presence in the village from the reign of Edward II.

The manor house, known as Sanderstead Court, was substantially remodelled by Harman Atwood. This large country house was probably first constructed in the early sixteenth century. The Atwoods continued to occupy the house until 1778, when it was devised to Atwood Wigsell. It was turned into a hotel in 1928, and before the Second World War it was used by the Royal Air Force (RAF). It was very badly damaged by fire (not a bomb) in 1944 and was demolished in 1958. One very small part of the hotel building does however still stand. On the site now stands "Sanderstead Court", a cluster of two-storey blocks of flats.

One of the more curious aspects of Sanderstead is that it has no pub, unlike nearby Warlingham which has around six.

On the edge of the village lies the site of the Old Saw Mill, now home to a number of private residences and the picturesque setting for Sanderstead Cricket Club. Cricket has been played in the area since the 18th century, with matches recorded in 1731 and 1732. The Old Saw Mill cricket ground itself has been in use since 1926 and continues to the present day with five teams playing in the Surrey Championship and a number of other Colts, The legendary Sunday XI and other friendly teams.

Located between Limpsfield Road and Kingswood Lane is the large Kings Wood. It derives its name from a small wood to the north of Kings Wood Lodge. In 1823, Ordnance Survey Maps called the wood Sanderstead Wood, but this might be due to a mistake. It covers some 147½ acres, criss-crossed by ancient rides and is on relatively flat ground. It was purchased in 1937 under the Green Belt Act by the local council and is now public open space. There is the site of a Romano-British settlement on the northern boundary, a small farmstead undisturbed for 2000 years.

== Education ==
Sanderstead has four schools, namely; Atwood Primary School, Gresham Primary School, Kingsdown Secondary School and Ridgeway Primary School. It is also conveniently placed for a number of others located within a couple of miles from the village including Croydon High School, Harris Academy Purley, Riddlesdown Collegiate, Royal Russell School, The Quest Academy, Thomas More Catholic School, Warlingham School, and Whitgift School.

== Demography ==
In the 2011 census, Sanderstead was White or White British (80.3%), Asian or Asian British (9.5%), Black or Black British (4.4%), Mixed/multiple ethnic groups (3.8%), and Other ethnic group (0.9%). The largest single ethnicity is White British (76.2%).

The crime rate in 2014/15 in Sanderstead was 29.6, the 7th lowest out of the 628 wards of Greater London.

== Politics ==
Sanderstead has consistently returned Conservative Party MPs to the local seat of Croydon South and has also returned Conservative members to the local council. Since the north of Croydon tends to return Labour councillors, a near-identical split in representation follows. The current MP for Croydon South is Chris Philp.

Sanderstead is one of the twenty-four wards constituting Croydon London Borough Council. Three councillors are elected every four years to represent the ward on the council. The current elected Councillors are:

Elected	Member	Ward
1998	Lynne Hale	Sanderstead
2022	Helen Redfern	Sanderstead
2006	Yvette Hopley	Sanderstead

Sanderstead 2022 (3)
Party	Candidate	Votes	%	±%
Conservative	Yvette Hopley	3,826		
Conservative	Lynne Hale	3,806		
Conservative	Helen Redfern	3,596		
Liberal Democrats	James Clark	718		
Liberal Democrats	Annie Jordan	705		
Labour	Laura Doughty	658		
Green	Helen Buckland	591		
Labour	Alan Malarkey	572		
Labour	Tim Rodgers	549		
Liberal Democrats	Edward Wells	510		
Green	Connie Muir	465		
Green	Oliver Duxbury	407		
Turnout			48.36	
Conservative hold		Swing		
Conservative hold		Swing		
Conservative hold		Swing		

On 1 April 1965 the civil parish was abolished. At the 1951 census (one of the last before the abolition of the parish), Sanderstead had a population of 20,940.

== Notable residents ==
In alphabetical order:

- Samuel Ogden Andrew (1868–1952), classical and Anglo-Saxon scholar
- John Atwood (1576–1644), was the Assistant Governor of the Plymouth Colony, in the US state of Massachusetts, in 1638. His childhood was spent at Sanderstead Court.
- Margaret Bondfield (1873–1953), the first woman to sit in Cabinet in the United Kingdom (1929–1931), died in Sanderstead.
- Dorothy Boyd (1907–96), actress
- Ruth Ellis (1926–55), the last woman to be executed in the UK, lived on Sanderstead Hill.
- Helen Harrison-Bristol (1909–95), pioneering Canadian female civil aviation instructor, lived at 33 Heathurst Road in the 1930s.
- Charlie Kray (1927–2000), criminal and elder brother of gangsters Ronald and Reggie Kray, lived for a time in Limpsfield Road in the 1990s.
- Laurier Lister (1907–86), theatre director and producer, was born in the village.
- Stephen Rumbold Lushington (1775–1868), lived for a time at Sanderstead Court, and his daughter was born there in 1816. He was Joint Secretary of the Treasury (1824–7), Governor of Madras (1827–32), and MP for Rye (1807–12) and for Canterbury (1812–30).
- Ronald Mansbridge (1905–2006), author and publisher
- Kate Moss (born 1974), model, lived at Church Way as a child and teenager. She went to Ridgeway Primary School, then Riddlesdown High School.
- Malcolm Muggeridge (1903–90) was born in Broomhall Road on 24 March 1903.
- Louisa Stammwitz (1850–1916), pharmacist
- Hilary Page (1904–57) was born in Sanderstead. Invented the interlocking plastic brick Kiddicraft.
- Marian Pepler (1904–97), architect and textile designer
- Eileen Ramsay (1915–2017), photographer
- John Randolph (1821–81), cricketer
- David Rippingale, aka William Hung, lead singer of I, Ludicrous, spent his formative years in Sanderstead (1958–71).
- Tony Sewell (born 1959), educationalist, lives in Sanderstead.
- Joan Turner (1922–2009), comedian and singer
- John Wenham (1913–96), Anglican biblical scholar
- Michael Willett (1933–2002), cricketer

== Nearest places ==
- Selsdon
- South Croydon
- Hamsey Green
- Warlingham
- Kenley
- Purley
- Riddlesdown

== Nearest railway stations ==
- Sanderstead railway station
- Purley Oaks railway station
- Riddlesdown railway station
