= John Randolph (cricketer) =

English cricketer

Personal information
- Full name: John Randolph
- Born: 15 May 1821; Sanderstead, Surrey, England
- Died: 11 July 1881 (aged 60); Sanderstead, Surrey, England
- Batting: Right-handed
- Bowling: Unknown

Domestic team information
- Years: Team
- 1842–1844: Oxford University
- 1846–1864: Marylebone Cricket Club

Career statistics
Competition	First-class
Matches	11
Runs scored	45
Batting average	2.36
100s/50s	–/–
Top score	10
Balls bowled	24
Wickets	1
Bowling average	19.00
5 wickets in innings	–
10 wickets in match	–
Best bowling	1/19
Catches/stumpings	8/–
- Source: Cricinfo, 18 June 2020

John Randolph (15 May 1821 – 11 July 1881) was an English first-class cricketer and clergyman.

The son of John Honywood Randolph, he born in May 1821 at Sanderstead, Surrey. He was educated at Westminster School, before going up to Brasenose College, Oxford in 1839, having decided initially to attend the University of Cambridge. While studying at Oxford, he played first-class cricket for Oxford University from 1842–44, making five appearances. He struggled with the bat for Oxford, scoring just 16 runs in ten innings. While still studying at Oxford, he made his debut for the Marylebone Cricket Club against Sussex in 1846 at Brighton.

After graduating from Oxford, Randolph took holy orders in the Church of England. He was appointed rector of Tyringham in Buckinghamshire in 1849, after which he was appointed chaplain of Tattenhoe from 1850–66. He continued to play first-class cricket for the MCC until 1864, making a total of six appearances from his debut for the MCC in 1846. His struggles with the bat continued for the MCC, with Randolph scoring just 29 runs in twelve innings. He was appointed rector of Sanderstead in 1866. His body was discovered in the rectory at Sanderstead on 11 July 1881, with Randolph having committed suicide by firearm.
