= John Atwood (colonial administrator) =

American politician (1576–1644)

John Atwood (1576–1644) was an assistant governor of the Plymouth Colony, in the future US state of Massachusetts, in 1638.

His parents were Nicholas Wood (abt. 1539–1586), of Sanderstead Court in the English county of Surrey (now Greater London), and Olive Harman (1548–1603), daughter of the wealthy London merchant, James Harman (abt. 1527–1581). He had nine brothers, two sisters, and one half brother (from his mother's marriage to John Buck in 1592).

Atwood's baptism record in Saint Martin in the Fields Church in London is dated 20 September 1576 and identifies him as "John Woode." His baptism is also recorded in Sanderstead parish church under the Latin form "Johannes". Despite being baptised as John Woode, he apparently went by the name Atwood, for this is the name he uses in his will prepared in 1643 and is also the name that Governor William Bradford uses when referring to him in his book Of Plymouth Plantation. To add confusion to the family names, John had a younger brother who was also named John ("Johanem" was his younger brother's baptismal name); this younger brother, John Wood (1582–1644), was a leather seller in London who emigrated to America in 1635.

He is mentioned in a legal proceeding in England in which his half brother, Oliffe (Oliver) Buck, claimed that both John and Harman Atwood (one of John's brothers) attempted to defraud him. Oliffe maintained that John owed him money, but that the two brothers conspired to hide John's assets so they could not be collected. The case also mentions that "John Attwood, became decayed in estate, was sued and cast into prison." Harman Atwood claimed he was innocent and that others had attempted to defraud Oliffe.

Atwood married Anne Lee, but they did not have any children; Anne died in Plymouth in about 1654. While he appears to have been a merchant in England before coming to Plymouth, Atwood's reasons for emigrating have never been explained. He was in America at least by 1637, and possibly as early as 1635.

He apparently had contact with colonists in Plymouth before he left England, because in 1633 Walter Harris signed a contract with him in London to become an indentured servant. In the contract Walter was expected to go from England to the Plymouth Colony and then work for a colonist named John Doane. John Doane became an Assistant Governor in Plymouth in 1633. Thomas Roberts is mentioned as being a servant to John Atwood in 1637 as are John Long and Richard Clark on 24 October 1638.

It appears that Atwood was in Plymouth at least by 1637 as there is a reference to him in Davis' Ancient Landmarks of Plymouth:

"As nearly as can be ascertained, the remainder of the land fronting on the north side of North Street, below the westerly boundary of the garden lot east of the Winslow house, was occupied by Thomas Prence as a place of residence while he was Governor of the colony, for the first time in 1634, and sold by him in 1637 to John Atwood. After the death of Mr. Atwood, which occurred in 1644, his widow, Ann Atwood, sold it in 1649 to Benjamin Vermayes." (Benjamin Vermayes was the husband of Mercy Bradford, Governor Bradford's daughter.)

John Atwood became an Assistant Governor in Plymouth in 1638. This position to which he was elected by other colonists who had taken the Oath of a Freeman indicates that he was viewed as a person of stature within the colony.

== Plymouth Adventurers ==
Atwood became a mediator in the ongoing dispute between Governor Bradford and his Plymouth Colony partners with the London owners of the Plymouth Company (the Plymouth Adventurers) over the amount owed to each party as a result of trade goods (mainly beaver pelts and other furs) that had been shipped to London. In his history Bradford states:

"Mr. Shereley being weary of this conrtoversie, and desirous of an end, (as well as them selves) write to Mr. John Atwode and Mr. William Collier, two of the inhabitants of this place, and of his speatiall acquaintance, and desired them to be a means to bring this business to an end, by advising and counselling the partners here..."

James Sherley was the Treasurer of the Plymouth Adventurers in London. This was a consortium of investors who financed the Plymouth Colony. The colonists had been shipping goods and products back to London to repay their loans, but the Plymouth Colony partners in America felt that they had not been getting adequate accounting for the sale of their goods in England; in short, they felt they were being cheated by their London partners. After "diverse days" spent on this matter, John Atwood was finally able to get the partners in London and Plymouth to agree to a compromise. It took two years, however, before the situation was finally resolved in 1642.

Atwood did not live long in his new home in Plymouth, for he died less than ten years after coming to America. It is not known precisely when he died—it was sometime between the date of his will, 20 October 1643, and the date that his will was probated on 5 June 1644. E. F. Atwood provides a transcript of his will in Ye Atte Wode Annals, and his wife Ann is named his sole executrix "to whom I will and bequeath all the rest of my estate". His will was witnessed by William Bradford and Robert Hicks. His wife, Ann (Lee) died in 1654.
