= Joan Turner =

British comedian and singer (1922–2009)

- Born: Joan Theresa Turner; 24 November 1922; Belfast, Northern Ireland
- Died: 1 March 2009 (aged 86); Banstead, Surrey, England

Joan Theresa Turner (24 November 1922 – 1 March 2009) was a British comedian and singer, born in Belfast and brought up in London. She appeared on stage and TV and had her own radio show, becoming the highest-earning female singer in Britain.

== Early years and education ==
Joan Theresa Turner was born in Belfast, Northern Ireland, on 24 November 1922. Her father was Leonard Turner, who became a London bus driver and subsequently taxicab driver after serving with the British Army in Ireland.

At the age of 11, Turner won a talent competition at a cinema in Peckham, South London, doing impressions of Shirley Temple and Jessie Matthews.

She won a scholarship to the Sacred Heart convent in Victoria, London, but told her teachers of her intention to pursue a theatrical career, and left school. In 1937, aged 14, she performed onstage at the Queen's Theatre, Poplar, a London music hall; the following year she toured in a revue, and she performed with The Crazy Gang in 1954.

== Career ==
In the 1960s and 1970s, she was a major star in the UK, becoming the highest-earning female singer in Britain, and a disc jockey on her own radio show. Turner was nicknamed "the women's answer to Harry Secombe" and presented her own television show. She topped the bill at the London Palladium and appeared in the 1963 Royal Variety Show, topping the bill ahead of The Beatles. She also topped bills in New York City and the Las Vegas Valley, and was romantically linked to Peter Sellers, Tony Hancock, and Terry-Thomas.

The London Evening News once said that she had "the voice of an angel and the wit of a devil". In its obituary, The Guardian claimed "she could sing a pop or operatic song with her four-and-a-half-octave soprano voice, do an almost eerily convincing impersonation of Bette Davis, and then switch to a stand-up comic routine."

According to her obituary in The Times, "she gained a reputation in show business for being difficult, despite her talent and managements soon became wary of booking her." In later years, it was reported that, after two divorces, she "drank and gambled away her fortune" and she was declared bankrupt in 1977, the same year she appeared in the Queen's Silver Jubilee performance. It was also in 1977 she was given the role of Widow Corney in a tour of Cameron Mackintosh's revival of the stage version of Oliver!. However, when the show subsequently opened in London, she was sacked after two weeks for throwing empty wine bottles out of her dressing room window.

In 1981, she guest starred on the Danish selection show for the Eurovision Song Contest. She continued singing 25 minutes longer than planned on the live broadcast. Finally, one of the hosts handed her a large fern to stop her from singing further, angering the singer.

== Later life and death ==
In 1990, she was a guest of honour at the celebrations of the Queen Mother's 90th birthday.

In the early 1990s, attempting to revive her career, she had a cameo role in EastEnders and a role as Auntie Lou in the Channel 4 soap opera Brookside. However, she was sacked from the latter after four episodes because of her drinking. In 1996, she went to California to attempt to give it "one more try" by auditioning for The Fabulous Palm Springs Follies, a dance troupe in Palm Springs for performers aged over 60. She failed the audition but decided to stay on in California illegally, her green card having expired in the 1980s.

In March 2001, the Sunday Mirror newspaper reported that she was living "among the winos, drug addicts and down-and-outs in Beverly Hills, Los Angeles... dressed in charity shop clothes and surrounded by her worldly possessions – with barely a penny to her name." She was interviewed in situ as a "bag lady" on Sunset Boulevard in the August 2001 Channel 4 documentary Celebrity: The Rise and Fall and it was reported elsewhere that she had spent five years "down-and-out" in L.A.

Later that year, she returned to the UK. In her final years, spent in sheltered accommodation in Surrey, she wrote an autobiography called I Thought It Grew on Trees.

She died on 1 March 2009 at her home in Banstead, Surrey, of a heart attack.

On 16 December 2010, BBC Radio 4 broadcast a programme entitled Joan Turner: The Highs and Lows of the Wacky Warbler in which Lesley Garrett told the story of the operatic comedian, containing interviews with her friends, stage associates and family as well as excerpts from her musical and comedy routines.

== Personal life ==
Her first husband was (William Hugh) Christopher Page of Lincoln, the grandson of Thomas Edmund Maynard-Page. He had divorced his first wife, Nancy Page, in November 1945. He married Joan Turner the next year.

By 1953 they lived at Heath House, on Cross O'Cliff Hill in Bracebridge Heath. On 26 June 1953 they had a daughter, Anne Therese. Anne Therese was christened at St Hugh's Church, Lincoln on Sunday 19 July 1953. On 19 June 1955, they had another daughter, (Pauline) Joanna, at Bromhead Nursing Home.

In 1957 she had a nervous breakdown. By the early 1960s they lived at Aisthorpe Hall in Aisthorpe, north of Lincoln.

In June 1963 she married 37-year-old Leslie Edward Cocks, at St Marylebone register office, whom she lived with at Sanderstead in the Surrey hills. They divorced on 7 November 1967. He would go on to produce New Faces.

Her daughter Anne Page lived at the Manor House in Waddington in 1970, attending the sixth form of Christ's Hospital Girls' High School, gaining English A-level in 1971. Both daughters also attended St Joseph's Convent RC school.
