= Marian Pepler =

British architect and textile designer

- Born: 24 August 1904; Sanderstead, Surrey, UK
- Died: 13 October 1997 (aged 93); Eynsham, Oxfordshire, UK
- Known for: Architect and Textile Design
- Spouse: R. D. Russell

Marian Pepler (24 August 1904 – 13 October 1997) was a British architect and textile designer. She specialized in carpet and rug designs producing over 90, often individually named, designs. She was an associate member of Royal Institute of British Architects, she held an Architectural Association diploma and featured on the National Register of Industrial Designers.

== Early life ==
Pepler was born in Sanderstead, Surrey, England, the daughter of the architect and subsequently town planner George Lionel (later Sir George) and Amy Pepler. She was also the niece of (Douglas) Hilary Pepler, the founder of the Ditchling Press.

The family lived in Surrey, and spent their holidays near Lulworth Cove in Dorset. Marian's background was a liberal one: it must have instilled in her a broad, even social sense of the importance of design, and the love of the country which is reflected in the natural earth colours of her rugs.

== Education ==
Marian attended Croydon School of Art from 1922–1923, then the Froebel Institute in Roehampton for a year of teacher training, and finally, in 1924, entered the Architectural Association schools in Bedford Square, at her father's suggestion, to learn model-making. Instead she became so interested that she stayed on to qualify as an architect.

On qualifying, in 1929, Marian was one of the few women of the minority that were at the Architectural Association to decide that she wanted strongly to work and design.

In 1930, Marian enrolled on a short course at the London School of Weaving, at Bryanston Street, Mable Arch, where she learned to make a warp, set up a loom, and weave a rug.

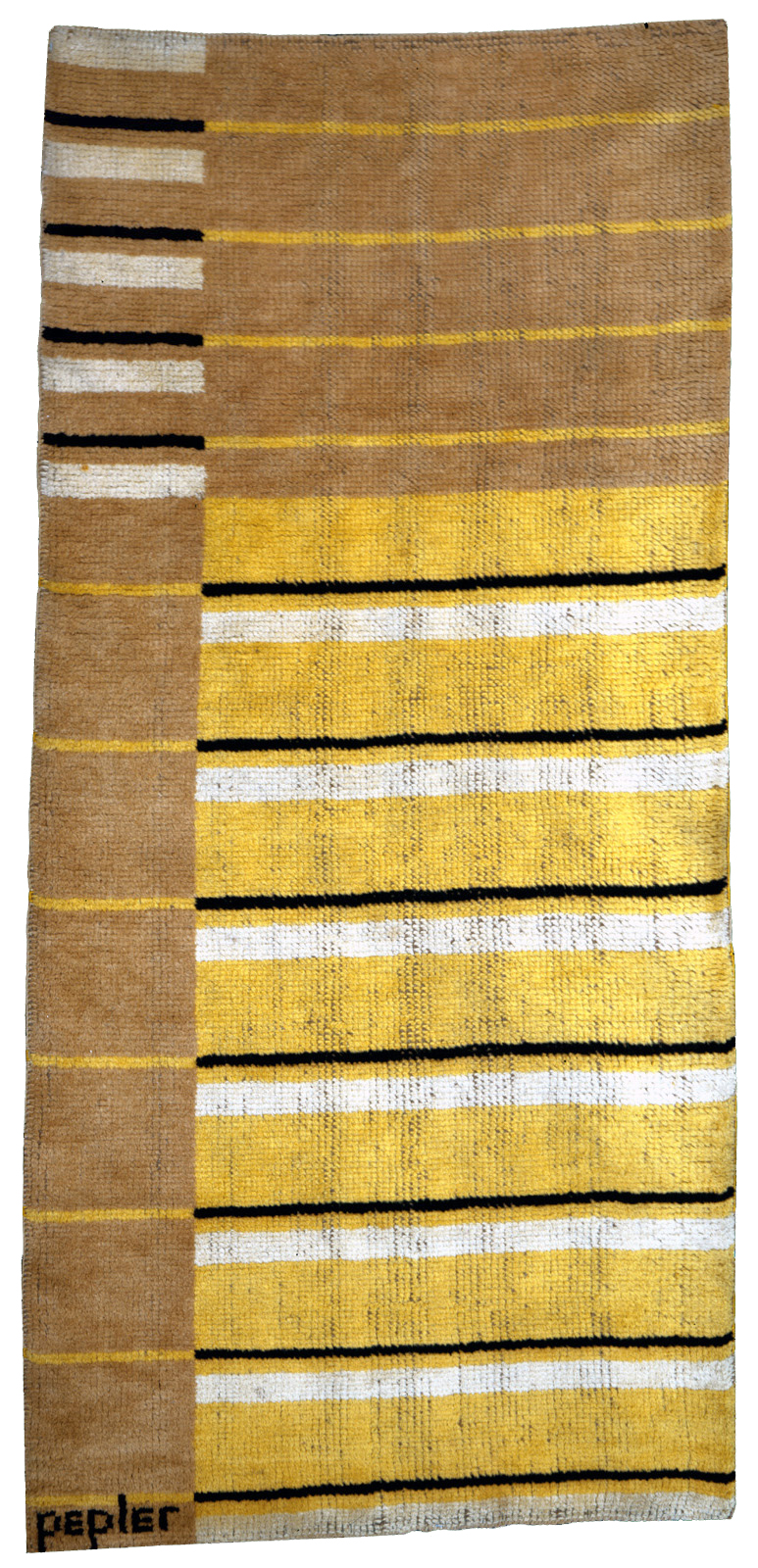
"5757" Rug by Marian Pepler designed in 1933

== Career ==
In 1930, Marian designed her first rug, Snowshill, a design of interlocking rectangles crossed by parallel lines of dots and crosses. Colour was also extremely important to her. Marian describes colour as more than half the design, and visited the various firms who made her rugs to make sure they had matched the dyes exactly.

The British carpet industry in the 1930s was in an extremely sluggish state, producing, because they could be sure of sales, designs that were either reproductions of Oriental carpets, or else the clichéd jazz patterns of what Pevsner called a deplorably mis-understood Continental cubism. The three firms who wove Marian's rugs were exceptions in an industry that was rarely prepared to take risks.

During the 1930s, Marian worked for Wilton Royal in two ways. Usually they paid her a royalty for each rug sold, and she retained the copyright. Such rugs were made on the whole, exclusively for Gordon Russell Ltd. Occasionally, however, she would sell copyright to Wilton Royal, receiving no royalty.

The Russell company used many of her designs in their interiors over the years and for a short period from 1933 to 1935 she acted as a buyer for the firm's London shop at 28 Wigmore Street, quickly expanding her role to include Broadway as well. While she was mainly occupied with acquiring fabrics she also moved into other components of the interior including ceramics and glass. When illness forced her to abandon this role she was superseded by the architectural historian Nikolaus Pevsner, who later described her work as possessing ‘a sensitivity and a quiet perfection not surpassed anywhere in Europe’ (The Independent, 25 Oct 1997). Pepler then became a consultant for the Gordon Russell firm, advising on furnishings and, in particular, colour. It was a role which she undertook again for her husband's practice after the war.

Pepler's rugs were all characterized by soft, earthy colours and simple, abstract decoration. She used mostly fawns and browns in the early 1930s but moved to include blue, green, and yellow a little later. Aquamarine, a rug of 1932, for example, had wavy lines and circles on its surface and it combined aquamarine, yellow, raisin brown, and natural in its subtle colour scheme. Throughout her career she was inevitably compared with the more flamboyant rug designer Marion Dorn, but Pepler's main purpose in designing a rug was to use it to bring together all the elements of the room and, for her, restrained colours did this more effectively. Her approach emanated from her training in architecture. In 1947 Pepler was elected a fellow of the Society of Industrial Artists, recognition that she had reached the peak of her profession. She continued to design, concentrating more and more on carpets. Post-war work of note includes rugs for the interior of the Oriana, produced in the mid-1950s.

The designs of Russell and Pepler shared a common goal and achieved the same standards although, as with so many designer couples, the work of the former is much more widely recognized. The consistently high quality of her work which came through at an exhibition of their work which was held at the Geffrye Museum in 1983 surprised many people who had not realized her full artistic capacity, however. They both played a key role in formulating a peculiarly British brand of modernism in the middle years of the century and in ensuring that with the enthusiasm for all things new the past was not entirely forgotten.

== Personal life ==
Marian met her husband R D Russell at the Architectural Association Schools where they both studied architecture. They got married on 1 December 1933. They moved to London, where they lived in Hanover Terrace Mews.

== Death ==
Marian Pepler died on 13 October 1997 at Eynsham, Oxfordshire.

== See also ==
- Women in architecture
