= William Atte Wode =

Sir William Atte Wode (bef. 1300 – c. 1346) was Captain of the King's Guard at the Palace of Westminster under King Edward III of England.

He was probably born sometime before 1300 in Coulsdon, Surrey, England. He was the son-in-law of Peter Atte Wode and Alice, who owned both Hooley House and Wood Place in Surrey. Sir William had at least three children with his wife Juliana: Geoffrey Atte Wode, Richard Atte Wode, and William Atte Wode.

While it is not known when he was knighted, it was at least by 1341, because by that time he is referred to as Sir William and is Captain of the King's Guard at the Palace of Westminster, the king's royal residence in London; members of parliament also met at Westminster Palace at this time. As a Sergeant at Arms, Sir William was part of the royal body guard that was composed of about thirty men at that time. It is not known what events occurred to bring William to King Edward III's attention for this position, but he must have had some connection through either friendship or family relations to the royal family.

An interesting anecdote about Sir William's life is recorded in John Heneage Jesse's Memorials of London (1341):

"In the 14th year of the reign of Edward III, John de Stratford, Archbishop of Canterbury, with a great number of London bishops, clergy, soldiers, came to the gate of Westminster Palace and demanded admittance to the chamber where Parliament was assembled. He was forbidden to enter in the King's name by Sir William Atwood, Captain of the King's Guard. The Archbishop was stopped because the followers were not members. The Archbishop was a member, but the King commended Sir William."

The Atte Wode lineage can be traced back to about 1204 when Peter de Wyckhurst (an older form of the name Atte Wode) purchased 'Hooley House' from the Bertan Marten, the Abbot of Chertsey Abbey. Over the next hundred years, the family added to its land holdings in Surrey and his father, Peter Atte Wode, purchased the 220-acre (0.89 km^{2}) estate known as 'Wood Place' in 1279. The Atte Wodes emerged as one of the new influential class of yeomen who were becoming substantial land owners in England. In 1318 Sir William and Juliana added to the family's fortune by purchasing another estate known as 'Beckenham' in Kent.

Two of Sir William's sons, Geoffrey and Richard, also became sergeants at arms to the king. Richard is mentioned in the London Letter Books for his role in moving the fleet being assembled at London down the Thames to invade France during the 1346 campaign in the Hundred Years' War.

E. F. Atwood asserts that Sir William and both of his sons accompanied the army on their invasion of France; however, his source for this information is not given. It does seem likely, however, given their positions as body guards to King Edward. Based on subsequent land transactions in England, it appears possible that both Sir William and his son Geoffrey were killed in the French campaign in 1346, (possibly at the Battle of Crecy), however, this is not certain.

Sir William's grandson, Peter Atte Wode, continued to expand both the family's land holdings and its influence by being appointed a Justice in Eyre; Peter's association with William of Wykeham who became the Bishop of Winchester and the Chancellor of England undoubtedly also helped to increase the family's influence.

The Atte Wode family name underwent a number of changes through the centuries with numerous variations in spelling: in the earliest records they are known as de Wyckhurst, by about 1300 they were commonly known as Atte Wode, a name that evolved into the modern version, Atwood, and finally, some (though not all) family members adopted the surname Wood in the 16th century.
