= Birch Selsdon Hotel =

Luxury hotel in Selsdon, London, England

Coordinates: 51.3391°N 0.0615°W

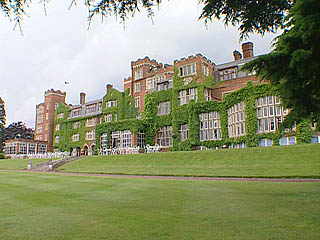

General information
- Location: Selsdon, London, United Kingdom
- Opening: 1927

Technical details
- Floor count: 4

Other information
- Number of rooms: 200
- Number of suites: 7
- Number of restaurants: 2
- Parking: 230 Spaces

Birch Selsdon was a luxury hotel located in Selsdon, London, England. It was housed in a country house.

== History ==
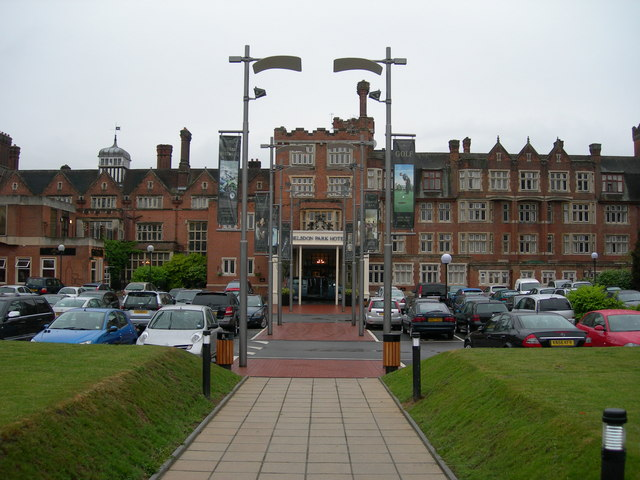
View of the front entrance

Selsdon Park passed through several private owners until 1924 when Allan Doble Sanderson bought the house and the accompanying 200 acres (0.81 km^{2}) of land for £13,000. In 1924 the Victorian country residence was converted into a 24-bedroom hotel which opened in 1925, and the first lift (elevator) was installed. Between 1927 and 1930, the East Wing was built and in 1935 the West Wing was added. At the same time, the whole of the building was covered in brick to give a Neo-Jacobean appearance. In 1929, the golf course was added. It was designed by J. H. Taylor, five-time British Open champion.

In 1960, Basil Sanderson took over the running of the hotel from his parents, whereupon he employed a young and up and coming hotel manager called John Aust. John Aust was instrumental in turning the hotel into one of the best hotels in the country. Improvements and additional rooms were added to the hotel, and in 1985 the leisure complex was completed at a cost of £1.5 million. The latest addition to the building, the Cambridge Wing, was finished in 1988 and has 25 bedrooms and a conference suite. On 13 March 1997, Principal Hotel Company purchased the De Vere Selsdon Estate and commenced with a £2.5 million refurbishment, including a new reception area, additional conference and banquet facilities and a business centre. Furthermore in 2020 the hotel undertook a further £1 million refurbishment to complete the hotel bedrooms and further meeting rooms to complete the multi-million pound refurbishment, having all of the hotel refurbishment between 2018 – 2020 including all public areas, meeting rooms and all 150 bedrooms.

In 2023, the hotel was completely renovated again and reopened as Birch Selsdon, a combination luxury hotel and private club.

In late 2023, the Hotel closed permanently.

The hotel has a minor role in British political history as it was the venue for a meeting of the Conservative Party Shadow Cabinet before the 1970 parliamentary elections. At that meeting the party agreed on an election manifesto that was notably more ideologically free market than at any previous election after World War II. It gave rise to the expression 'Selsdon Man'. The Conservative Party under Heath won the election, however, Heath failed to follow his election promises, eventually leading to his replacement by Margaret Thatcher.

== Facilities ==
The Selsdon Estate possesses 205 acres (0.83 km^{2}) of parkland. It has 26 conference rooms and a leisure centre including indoor swimming pool. Dining facilities include the Cedar restaurant, Phoenix grill and bar, and a terrace. The grounds include an 18-hole golf course, two grass tennis courts, two all-weather tennis courts, a jogging trail, a boules pitch, a croquet lawn, and a putting green.

== See also ==
- Selsdon Group
