= Littleheath Woods =

Woodlands in London, England

Coordinates: 51.3493°N 0.06064°W

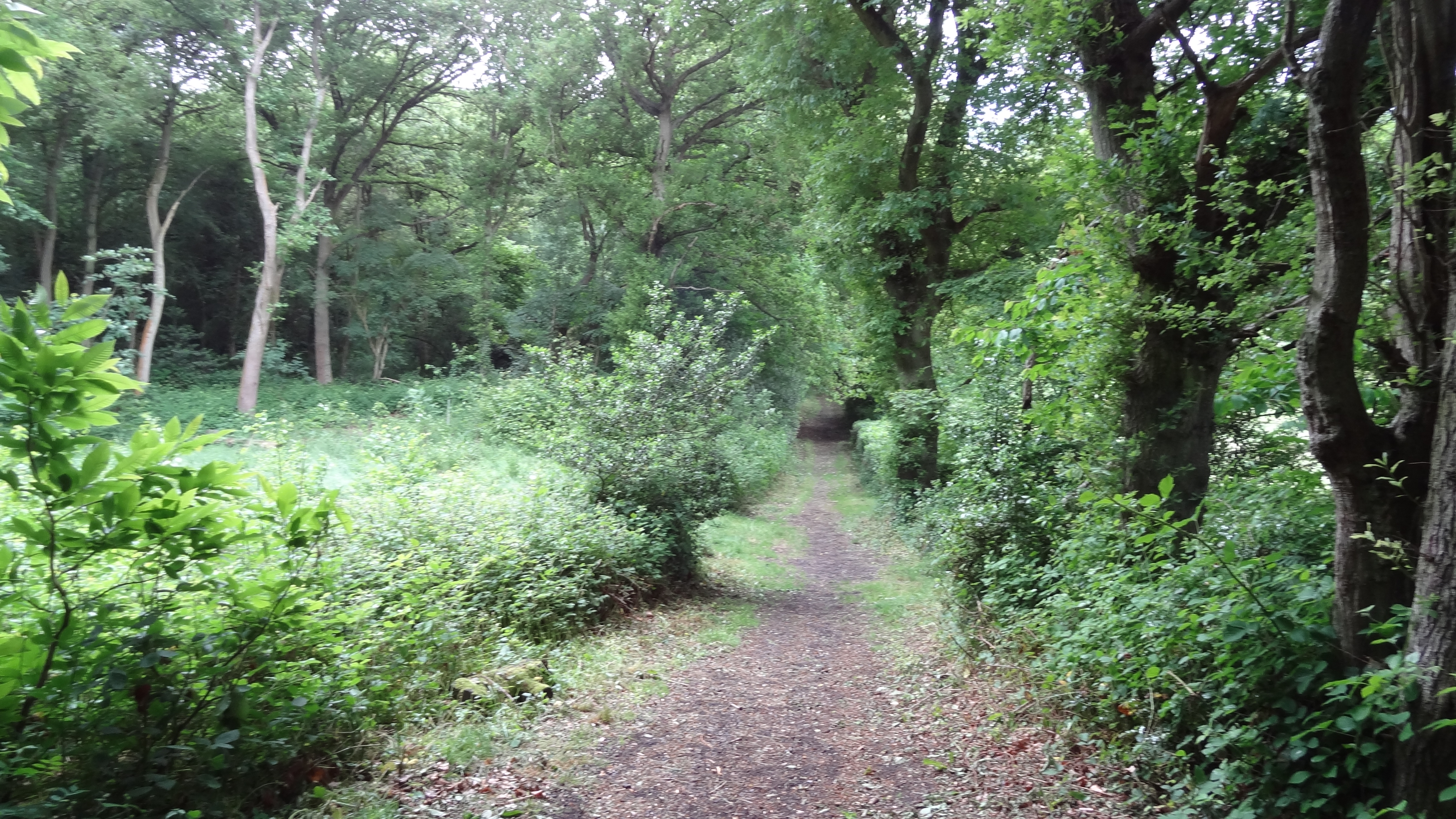
Littleheath Woods

Littleheath Woods is the collective name for Littleheath Wood, Foxearth Woods, part of Queenhill Shaw and part of Gee Wood in Selsdon in the London Borough of Croydon. It is a Site of Borough Importance for Nature Conservation, Grade I, with an area of 64 acres (26 ha). It is owned by Croydon Council and the Friends of Littleheath Woods assist with the management.

The woods were saved from housing development of the area in the late 1920’s thanks to the campaigning and fundraising efforts of The Selsdon Resident Association and in particular local conservation hero Malcolm Sharpe. The Woods opened to the public in 1932.

The woods have tall oaks above a layer of sweet chestnut, rowan and birch, and there are several areas of grassland. Plants include wood anemone, bluebell and greater stitchwort and at the southern end there is a small pond with amphibious bistort and brooklime. In the north there is acid grassland.

There is access from neighbouring roads including Croham Valley Road, Littleheath Road, Edgecoombe and Foxearth Road.

The wood was once used for shooting and a pheasantry was established on part of the land. Much of the low-level planting was established to provide cover for the game-birds.

The soil (soft sand) is of a type suitable for badgers and there are active setts within the woodland.
