= Michael Willett (cricketer) =

English cricketer

Mike Willett

Personal information
- Full name: Michael David Willett
- Born: 21 April 1933; West Norwood, London, England
- Died: 24 January 2002 (aged 68); Sanderstead, London, England
- Batting: Right-handed
- Bowling: Right-arm medium

Domestic team information
- Years: Team
- 1955 to 1967: Surrey

Career statistics
Competition	FC	List A
Matches	172	8
Runs scored	6535	188
Batting average	28.66	24.77
100s/50s	8/35	0/0
Top score	126	46*
Balls bowled	2779	255
Wickets	23	5
Bowling average	48.04	34.20
5 wickets in innings	–	–
10 wickets in match	–	n/a
Best bowling	3/36	2/20
Catches/stumpings	94/–	3/–
- Source: Cricinfo, 23 November 2018

Michael David Willett (21 April 1933 – 24 January 2002) was an English cricketer who played first-class cricket for Surrey from 1955 to 1967. He was awarded his county cap in 1962, and had a benefit season in 1969.

Mike Willett was a hard-hitting batsman who played for Surrey for several years before establishing himself in the team: between his first-class debut in 1955 and the end of the 1960 season he played only 25 matches, reaching 50 once. He made a century in his first match in 1961 and finished the season with 1593 runs at an average of 30.63. His most productive season was 1964, when he made 1789 runs at 45.87 and finished ninth among English players in the first-class averages. He hit the fastest century of the 1964 season against Middlesex, reaching 100 in 80 minutes, while in equalling his highest score of 126 against Hampshire he hit his second 50 in 30 minutes.

Willett missed most of the 1965 season after a cartilage operation and never recovered his best form. He retired after the 1967 season, during which he hit 103 in 64 minutes for Surrey Second XI against Warwickshire Second XI, out of the 116 runs his team made while he was at the wicket. His innings included 12 sixes.
