= Selsdon Man =

1970s British political term

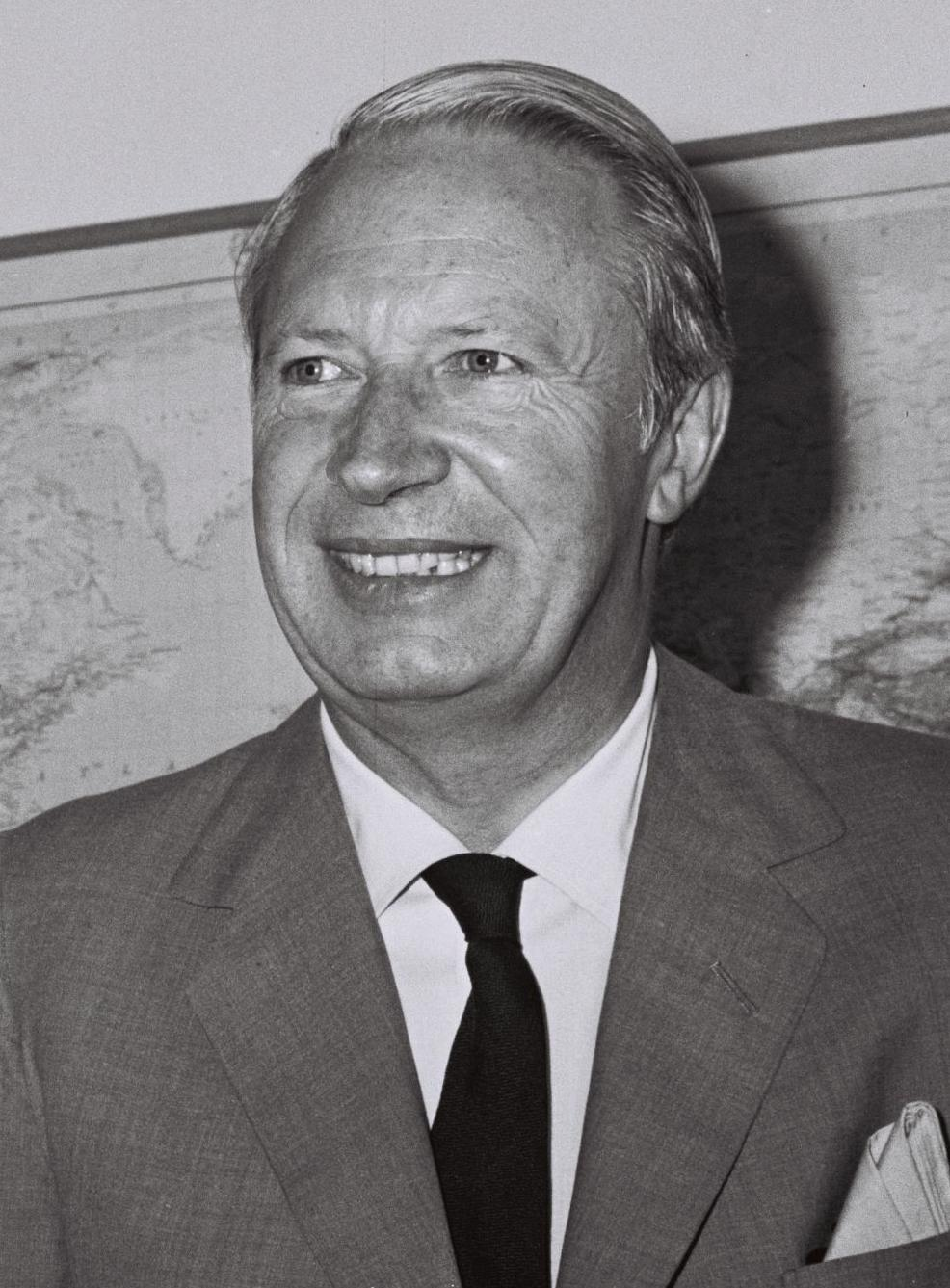
Edward Heath in 1969

The term 'Selsdon Man' was coined by Labour Party Prime Minister Harold Wilson to describe the free-market economic policy of his principal rival, Conservative leader Edward Heath. It was intended as a derogatory reference to the historic 'Piltdown Man', the supposed remains of an early human later determined to be an elaborate fraud.

In January 1970, the Conservative shadow cabinet held a conference at Selsdon Park Hotel to plan future policy ahead of that years' general election. The result was a series of free-market policies that would eventually be included in the 1970 Conservative Party Manifesto. Edward Heath's Conservative Party won the 1970 general election in a surprise victory, securing a majority of 30 seats.

Though Heath's Conservative government initially put some of their Selsdon free-market policies into practice, they had largely been reversed by the end of 1972.

== Selsdon Man policies ==
In its 1970 manifesto, the Conservative Party pledged to:

- reduce income tax
- cut state spending
- prevent further nationalisation
- reduce the size of government
- reduce the scope of state intervention
- promote competitive free enterprise to combat inflation
- abandon Labour's compulsory wage controls
- restrict the power of trade unions

== In government ==
Chancellor of the Exchequer Anthony Barber cut direct taxation and public spending during his first few years in office. In an October 1970 statement, Barber announced that he would cut corporation tax, cut income tax and oversee a reduction of £330 million in public spending over the course of 1971/2. The same statement saw a rise in NHS prescription charges and the abolition of free school milk for 7-11 year-olds. In his 1971 budget, Barber made more than £1.1 billion worth of cuts to taxation. Barber's 1972 budget saw a further £1 billion cut to income tax. Barber also oversaw the abolition of the Prices and Incomes Board.

Heath appointed the former director-general of the Confederation of British Industry, John Davies, as the Secretary of State for Trade and Industry. Davies spoke out against subsidising the 'lame ducks' of British industry, aligning himself with the Conservative Party's commitment to reduce state spending and the scope of state intervention. Furthermore, the Heath government introduced a new legal code to regulate trade union practices with the Industrial Relations Act of 1971. This act introduced the National Industrial Relations Court.

By mid-1971, the Heath government had reversed much of its pledged non-interventionism in response to a sharp rise in both unemployment and inflation. Rolls-Royce and Upper Clyde Shipbuilders were both taken into public ownership in 1971. The 1970 promise to avoid wage controls was abandoned by September 1972, when Heath's government introduced a compulsory prices and incomes policy. 1972 also saw John Davies removed from his role as Secretary for Trade and Industry and considerable increases in public spending on health, education, and welfare.

Heath ultimately failed to restrict the power of the trade unions. Union opposition to the measures included in the 1971 Industrial Relations Act contributed greatly to the collapse of the Heath government in 1974.

== Wilson's response ==
Prime Minister Harold Wilson was strongly critical of the policies formulated at the Selsdon Park conference, repudiating the Conservative Party's support of free-market reform in several speeches:

What they are planning is a wanton, calculated and deliberate return to greater inequality. The new Tory slogan is: back to the free for all. A free for all in place of the welfare state. A free for all market in labour, in housing, in the social services. They seek to replace the compassionate society with the ruthless, pushing society. The message to the British people would be simple. And brutal. It would say: 'You're out on your own.' — Harold Wilson, 6th of February, 1970

== The Selsdon Group ==
The Selsdon Group is a free-market pressure group created in 1973 to support the policies set out at the 1970 Selsdon Park Conference. The Group's website declares that its purpose is 'to promote the case for free market policies within the Conservative Party'.
