= All Saints, Sanderstead =

All Saints
- All Saints' Church
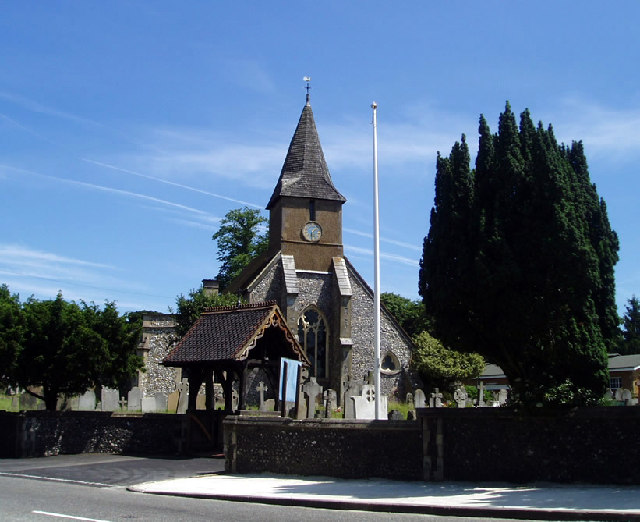
- All Saints' Church
- All Saints
- 51°20′12″N 0°04′32″W
- Location: Onslow Gardens, Sanderstead, South Croydon, CR2 9AB
- Country: England
- Denomination: Church of England
- Churchmanship: Anglicanism

History
- Dedication: All Saints

Architecture
- Heritage designation: Grade I listed
- Years built: 1230

Administration
- Diocese: Diocese of Southwark
- Archdeaconry: Archdeaconry of Croydon
- Deanery: Croydon Central
- Parish: All Saints

Clergy
- Bishop: The Rt Revd Jonathan Clark (Bishop of Croydon)

All Saints is a church of England church in Croydon, London, England. It is a Grade I listed building.

== History ==
It was built in 1230, with the tower being added in 1330; the north aisle and vestries in 1937; and a northern extension in 1981.

=== Present day ===
The church falls within Croydon Central Deanery in the Diocese of Southwark.

All Saints is a parish in the Anglican tradition.
