= Sutton Underground line proposal =

Unopened London Underground line

Coordinates: 51.3606°N 0.1919°W

Sutton Underground Line Proposal
- Interactive map of Sutton Underground Line Proposal

General information
- Location: Sutton
- Local authority: Sutton
- Owner: Never opened

Other information

The Sutton Underground Line was a proposed extension to the London Underground network in Sutton, South London that ultimately never materialised. Although Sutton does not have a direct Tube station today, historical plans indicate that, had certain factors played out differently, the area could have been connected to both the District line and the Northern line. The proposal was part of broader efforts in the early 20th century to expand London's Underground network and reduce the dominance of other railway companies.

== Background ==
Sutton's railway history dates back to 1847, when the London, Brighton and South Coast Railway (LB&SCR) opened a station on its Portsmouth line. At the time, Sutton was a small village with a population of just over 1,000. However, as the 20th century progressed, Sutton grew rapidly, reaching a population of over 20,000 by the turn of the century. Local landowners, eager to enhance property values and reduce the LB&SCR's monopoly, began exploring the idea of a new railway connection to Wimbledon, which would lead to the formation of the Wimbledon and Sutton Railway.

== The Wimbledon and Sutton Railway proposal ==
The initial goal of the Wimbledon and Sutton Railway was to provide an alternative route into London, breaking the LB&SCR's monopoly over local rail services. The landowners behind the project first approached the London and South Western Railway (LSWR), which controlled Wimbledon station. However, the LSWR showed little interest in the proposal. As a result, the Wimbledon and Sutton group turned to the District Railway (now part of the London Underground's District line), which already ran services to Wimbledon. The District Railway saw potential in the plan, as it could feed additional passengers onto their routes into central London. While the District Railway did not make a formal commitment at this stage, it expressed conditional interest in supporting the scheme.

=== Proposed route and stations ===
The proposed line would have started at Wimbledon, where it would connect with District line services, and run through then rural areas, eventually terminating at Sutton. Intermediate stations were to include Cannon Hill, Green Lane, Morden, Elm Farm, Sutton Common and Cheam. At Sutton, the line would have connected with the existing LB&SCR station, creating an interchange between the two networks. A bill to construct the line was presented to Parliament in 1909. However, the proposal faced strong opposition from the London, Brighton and South Coast Railway, which argued that Sutton lacked the necessary passenger demand to justify a new line. Additionally, the London, Brighton and South Coast Railway accused the District Railway of attempting to extend its services towards Brighton, a claim partly based on the District Railway's earlier plans to run services to Southend-on-Sea by 1910.

== Failure of the proposal ==
=== The Southern Railway and the Underground Group ===
The landscape shifted dramatically in the 1920s, particularly after the formation of the Southern Railway in 1923. This new company, which had absorbed several major railway lines including the London, Brighton and South Coast Railway, began electrifying its commuter routes, prompting the Underground Group (which owned the District Railway and several other lines) to consider an extension to Sutton. This was part of a broader strategy to connect the Underground network with South London. A 1922 bill aimed to extend the City and South London Railway (now part of the Northern Line) from Clapham Common to Sutton, but it encountered resistance from the Southern Railway, which viewed the London Underground's expansion as a threat to its own electrification projects.

=== Political and financial negotiations ===
The Southern Railway's opposition led to a compromise in 1924, when the company agreed to build the Sutton line, but with the condition that the District Railway would be permitted to operate trains over the new route. Additionally, while the CSLR would extend southwards, it would not be directly connected to Sutton. Construction of the Sutton line commenced soon after, but the project was hindered by challenging geography, including steep gradients and sharp curves. World War I also delayed the construction, and by the time the line was completed in 1930, the original vision of an Underground-style service to Sutton had been significantly scaled back.

=== The opening of the Sutton Line ===
The Sutton line was officially opened in 1930 as part of the Southern Railway network, but it was not incorporated into the Underground system as initially planned. Due to logistical challenges at Wimbledon station, where the junction for the proposed line would have been located on the opposite side of the station, the District Railway never extended its services to Sutton.

== Legacy ==
Sutton remains an important part of South London's transport network, but the absence of a direct Underground link stands as a significant point in the area's transport history. Had the original plans for the Sutton Underground line been realised, the area would have benefited from direct access to both the District Line and the Northern Line, enhancing travel options and positioning Sutton as a major transportation hub in London.
