= Morden tube station (District Railway) =

Unbuilt London Underground station

Morden
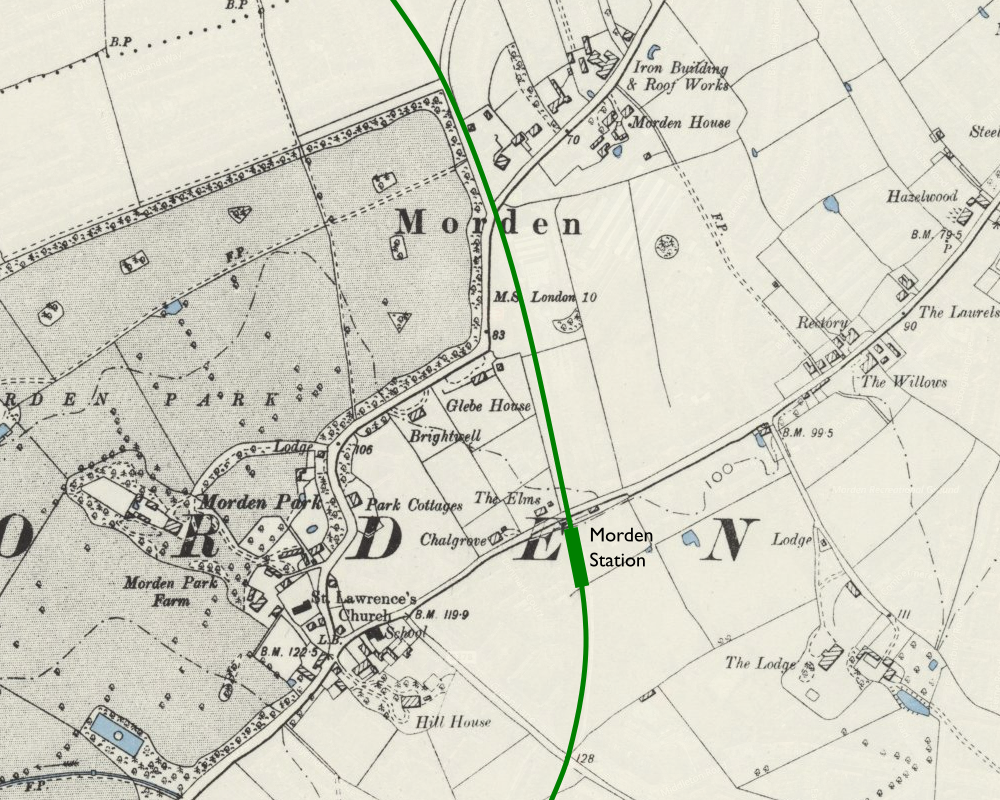
- Proposed location superimposed on Ordnance Survey map

- Location of Morden in Greater London
- Location: Morden
- Owner: Never built

Railway companies
- Original company: Wimbledon and Sutton Railway

Other information
- Coordinates: 51.3934596°N 0.199563°W

Morden (later South Morden) was an authorised railway station planned by the Wimbledon and Sutton Railway (W&SR) and Underground Electric Railways Company of London (UERL), but never built. It was to be located close to the original centre of Morden village in the London Borough of Merton, in south-west London.

== Plan ==
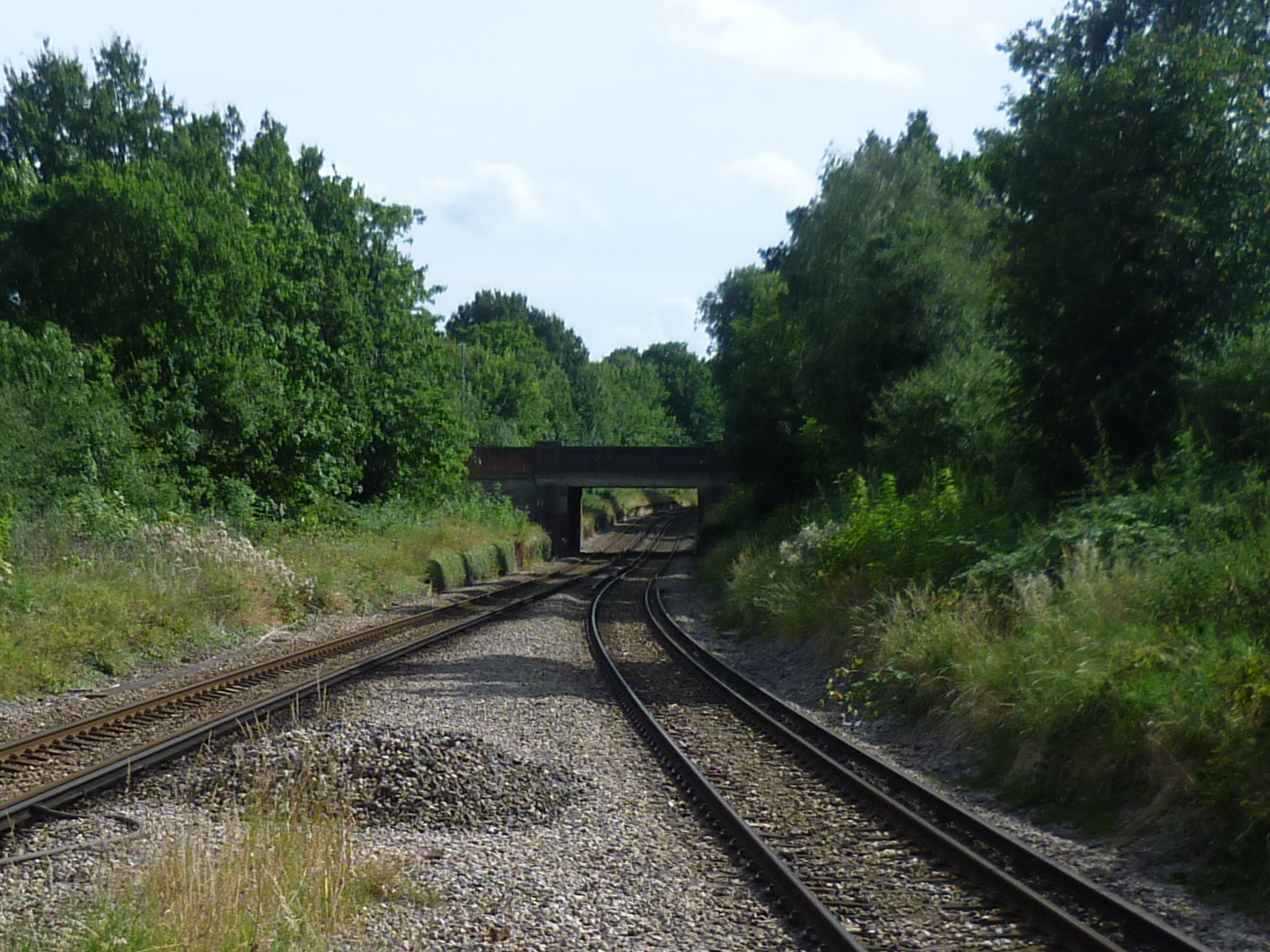
Road bridge carrying Central Road over the railway. The site proposed for the station was on the other side of the bridge.

The station was to have been built on the W&SR's planned surface railway line in Surrey (now south-west London) from Wimbledon to Sutton. The station was to be on the south side of Central Road. The construction of the railway was approved in 1910. In 1911 the UERL agreed to provide funding for the line's construction and to operate its train services by extending the UERL's District Railway (DR) from Wimbledon station.

Delays in the purchase of land along the railway's route and the outbreak of the First World War prevented the works from commencing; the permission was extended several times, with a final extension granted in 1922. Following the war, the UERL presented new proposals to construct an extension of the City and South London Railway (C&SLR, now part of the Northern line) southward in tunnel from Clapham Common, coming to the surface at Morden, and thence joining the W&SR route. Both DR and C&SLR trains were to run to Sutton. The first C&SLR station to the north was to be named "North Morden" and the W&SR station near the village was to be named "South Morden". The plan to extend the C&SLR was opposed by the Southern Railway (SR), the operator of the mainline services through Wimbledon and Sutton. A settlement between the companies agreed that the extension of the C&SLR would end at North Morden (which opened as plain "Morden"), and the W&SR would be taken over and its route would be constructed by the SR.

When the Wimbledon-to-Sutton line was constructed by the SR in the late 1920s, Morden village station was omitted and replaced with Morden South to the north adjacent to London Road, and St Helier to the south on Green Lane.

Abandoned plans
Preceding station	London Underground	Following station
Elm Farm towards Sutton	District line (Wimbledon & Sutton Railway 1910)	Merton Park towards Barking or Edgware Road
Sutton Common towards Sutton	District line (Wimbledon & Sutton Railway 1922)	Merton Park towards Barking or Edgware Road
Sutton Common towards Sutton	Northern line (City & South London Railway)	North Morden towards Edgware, Mill Hill East or High Barnet

== Bibliography ==
- Jackson, Alan A. (December 1966). "The Wimbledon & Sutton Railway – A late arrival on the South London suburban scene" (PDF). The Railway Magazine. pp. 675–680.
- Wilson, Geoffrey (September 2008). "The Wimbledon & Sutton Railway" (PDF). Merton Historical Society: Bulletin 167: 10–13.
