= Merton Park =

Suburb of London, England

Coordinates: 51.4106°N 0.2017°W

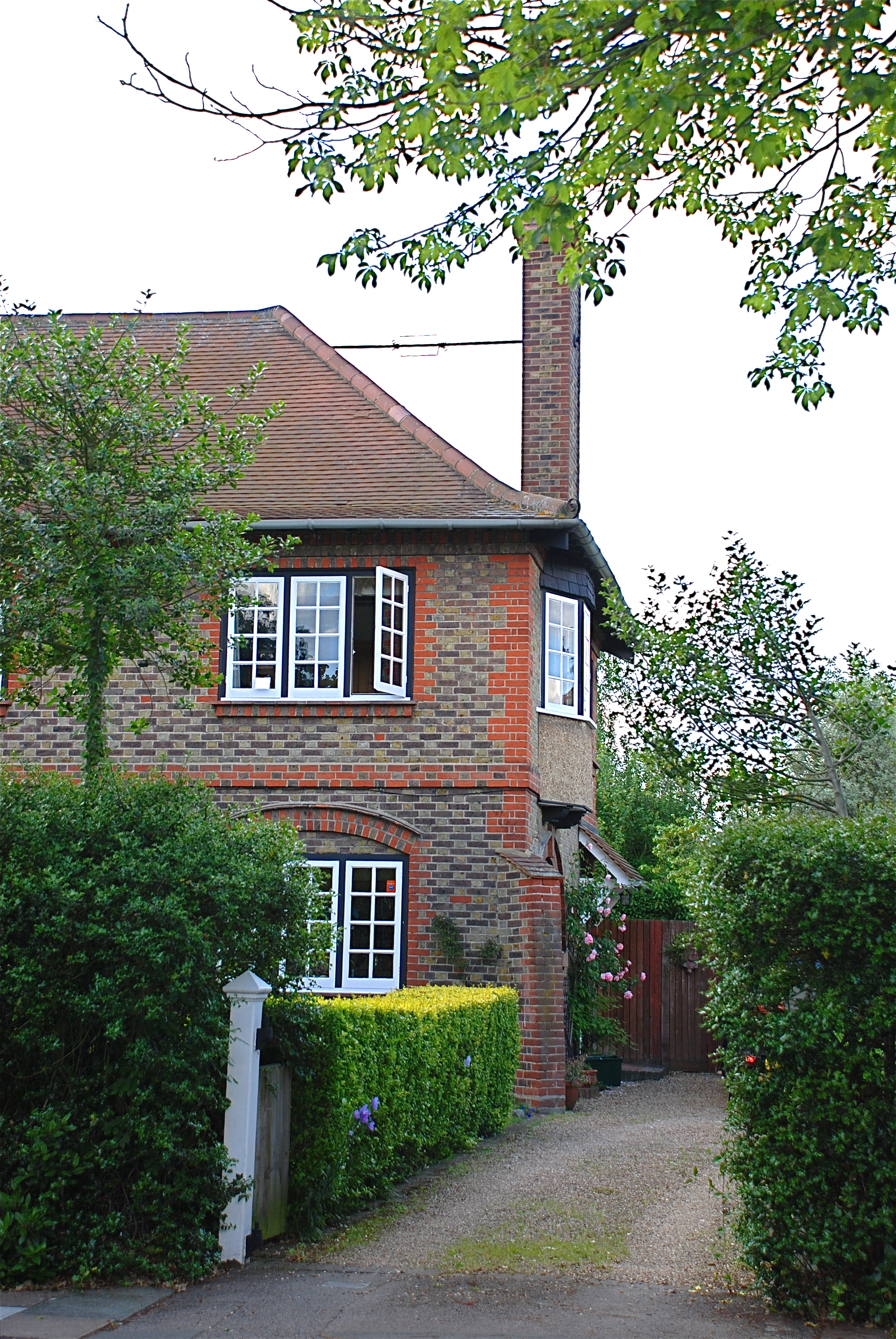
- A house in Merton Park

- Location within Greater London
- Population: 9,485 (2011 Census. Ward)
- OS grid reference: TQ250695
- London borough: Merton
- Ceremonial county: Greater London
- Region: London
- Country: England
- Sovereign state: United Kingdom
- Post town: LONDON
- Postcode district: SW19 and SW20
- Dialling code: 020
- Police: Metropolitan
- Fire: London
- Ambulance: London
- UK Parliament: Wimbledon
- London Assembly: Merton and Wandsworth

Merton Park is an area in London Borough of Merton. Bordering areas are Colliers Wood, Morden, South Wimbledon and Raynes Park. It is 7.25 miles (11.67 km) southwest of Charing Cross. It lies 2.8 miles (4.5 km) east of Kingston upon Thames, 3 miles (4.8 km) west of Mitcham and 4.5 miles (7.2 km) north of Sutton.

Farmland in the area was bought by John Innes in 1864 and developed in the following decades. Innes provided in his will for his home, the Manor House, to become what is now the John Innes Centre which remains a leading centre for plant genetics albeit now in Norwich. While in Merton it created new plant varieties such as the ‘Merton Thornless’ blackberry and the Malling-Merton (MM) series of apple rootstocks, as well as John Innes composts.

== History ==
Until the last quarter of the 19th century, the parish of Merton was mainly rural. The area now known as Merton Park was farmland bought by City wine merchant John Innes in 1864 following the rapid development of Wimbledon to the north. He took as his model the garden suburbs (particularly Bedford Park in Chiswick) and between 1870 and 1904 developed the tree-lined roads of detached and semi-detached houses for which the area is known.

Innes bought Manor Farm for his own home, and in the 1890s had it rebuilt as the Manor House by architect Henry Goodall Quartermain. Around 1872, Innes became Lord of the manor of Merton. After his death in 1904 he left most of the grounds of the Manor House to be converted into a public park, with the rest becoming the John Innes Horticultural Institution . The first director was William Bateson, who had coined the word "genetics" and would found The Genetics Society in 1919. The geneticist J. B. S. Haldane worked part-time at the Institution from 1927 to 1937. When Sir Alfred Daniel Hall became director after Bateson's death in 1926, one of his earliest tasks was to appoint as assistant director "a man of high quality in the study of genetics" as Hall lacked a background in genetics. Upon the recommendation of Julian Huxley, the council appointed Haldane in March 1927, with the terms: "Mr. Haldane to visit the Institution fortnightly for a day and a night during the Cambridge terms, to put in two months also at Easter and long vacations in two continuous blocks and to be free in the Christmas vacation." He was officer in charge of Genetical Investigations. Haldane was credited with helping the John Innes become "the liveliest place for research in genetics in Britain".

The genetics research of Dorothea De Winton and Haldane required the reliable cultivation of large numbers of primulas; after large losses in the 1933-34 season William Lawrence and John Newell formulated composts that would give consistently good and reliable results. In 1938 they published their recipes for what became known as John Innes composts. New fruit varieties released by the Institution included the blackberries ‘Merton Early’ (1936) and ‘Merton Thornless’ (1941), and the Malling-Merton (MM) series of apple rootstocks. The Institution moved to Bayfordbury, Hertfordshire, in 1950 and subsequently to Norwich, where it is now known as the John Innes Centre.

== Government ==
A notable feature of the Merton Park ward is that it regularly returns Merton Park Ward Independent Residents to Merton London Borough Council. Five MPWRA have also been Deputy Mayor of Merton: Peter Southgate in 2005/06, Krysia Williams in 2008/09, Karin Forbes in 2009/10, John Sargeant in 2013/14 and Edward Foley 2019/20.

The John Innes Society is a charity that promotes good design and area embellishment in Merton Park.

== Geography ==
The approximate boundaries of the Merton Park area can be considered to be The Broadway (A219) to the north, Morden Road (A24) to the east, Martin Way to the south and Cannon Hill Lane to the west. Additionally, the area north of Kingston Road between Merton Hall Road, Avebury Road and Kingswood Road is often included. This definition of the area does not correspond directly with the Local Government ward of the same name which for administrative convenience includes areas as far south as Morden South railway station.

The area contains two state schools: Merton Park Primary and Rutlish School (boys) and is almost entirely residential in character without shops or pubs except a bar at the Old Rutlishians ('Old Ruts') playing field and clubhouse in Poplar Road.

Residential roads in Merton Park include: Dorset Road (B285), Hartfield Road (B285), Mostyn Road (B2850), Kenley Road, Windermere Avenue, Sandbourne Avenue, Gladstone Road, Russell Road, Pelham Road, Merton Road (A219), The Broadway (A219), Poplar Road, Cannon Hill Lane (In SW20), Aylward Road (In SW20). Several of these are named after former Prime Ministers.

== Transport ==
Merton Park is relatively rich in public transport, being served by National Rail, London Underground and London Trams.

South Merton and Wimbledon Chase railway stations provide a 2 tph service towards Wimbledon and central London on the Thameslink Sutton Loop Line. From Wimbledon there are also frequent South Western Railway services towards Clapham Junction and London Waterloo as well as London Underground services on the District line.

The tube station in Morden is the southern terminus of the Northern line.

London Trams also serve the area from Merton Park tram stop, which provides services towards Wimbledon and Croydon. The tram stop occupies part of the former Merton Park railway station, which closed in 1997.

== Landmarks ==
The area is centred on the historic parish church, St Mary's. The church was founded in the 12th century by the Augustinian order of the nearby Merton Priory of which only the Western Gate remains. John Innes is buried in the churchyard.

The northern section of Merton Park each side of Kingston Road (A238) and Below Dorset Road to the B286 are now conservation areas.

Parks in the area include:

- John Innes Park & Recreation Ground
- Mostyn Gardens
- Kendor Gardens
- Church Lane Playing Fields
- St Mary's Glebe

== Notable people ==
- Artist Graham Sutherland grew up on Dorset Road
- John Innes, property developer and philanthropist
- William Bateson, geneticist and first director of the horticultural institution
- Sir Alfred Daniel Hall, agricultural educator
- J. B. S. Haldane, geneticist
- Dorothea De Winton, geneticist
- John Dimmer, recipient of the Victoria Cross in 1914, lived here.
- Folk singer Sandy Denny was born in the Nelson Hospital.
- Ronnie Wood from the Rolling Stones lived on Mostyn Road after they moved back to the UK from America in 1986. They left the area in 1991.

== See also ==
- Merton Park Studios
- The Merton Parkas
