= Cannon Hill tube station =

Unbuilt London Underground station

Cannon Hill
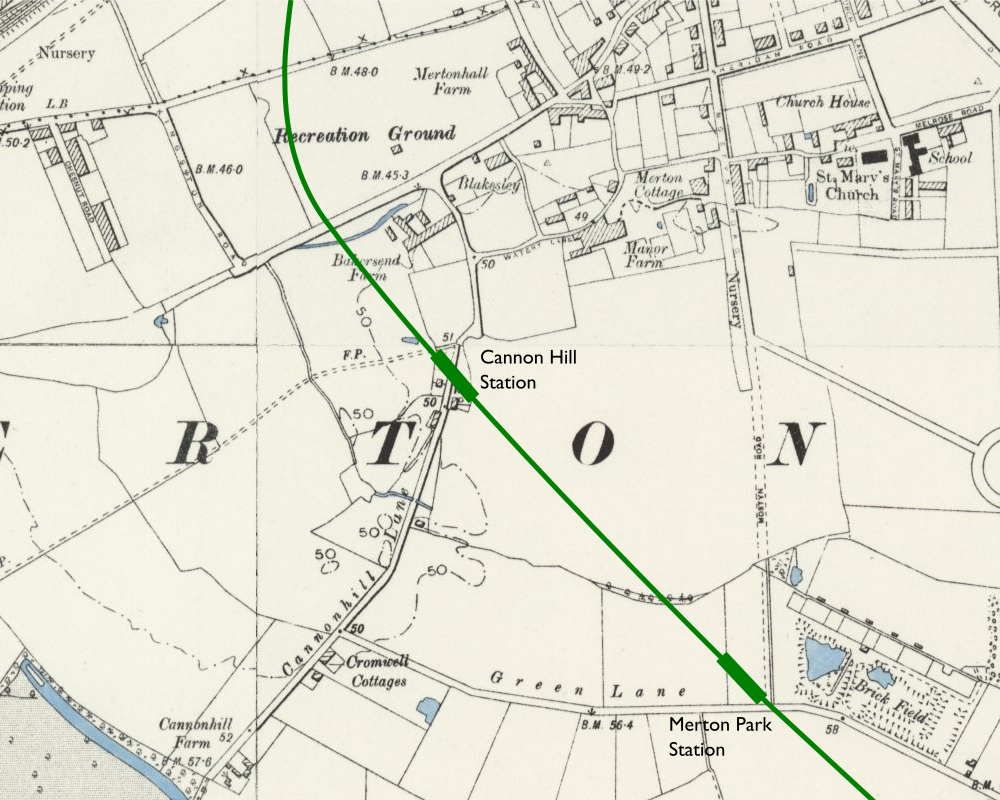
- Proposed location superimposed on Ordnance Survey map

- Location of Cannon Hill in Greater London
- Location: Merton
- Owner: Never built

Railway companies
- Original company: Wimbledon and Sutton Railway

Other information
- Coordinates: 51.407297°N 0.211470°W

Cannon Hill was an authorised railway station planned by the Wimbledon and Sutton Railway (W&SR) and Underground Electric Railways Company of London (UERL) but never built. It was to be located on Cannon Hill Lane in Merton, in south-west London.

== Plan ==
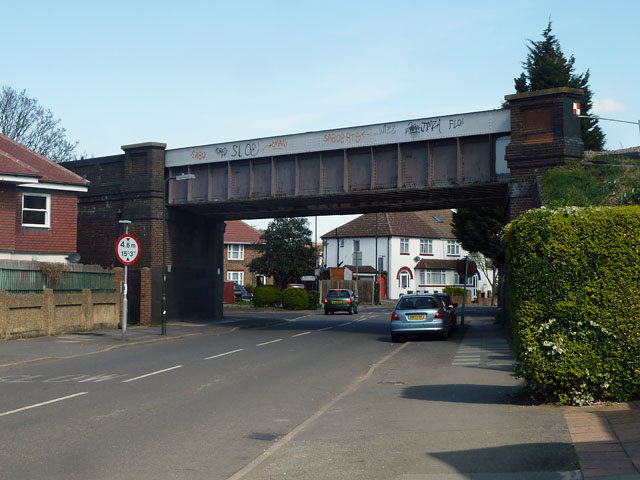
Railway bridge over Cannon Hill Lane, the site proposed for the station

The station was to have been built on the W&SR's planned surface railway line in Surrey (now south-west London) from Wimbledon to Sutton. The station was to be built on a bridge where the railway crosses Cannon Hill Lane. The construction of the railway was approved in 1910. In 1911 the UERL agreed to provide funding for the line's construction and to operate its train services by extending the UERL's District Railway (DR) from Wimbledon station.

Delays in the purchase of land along the railway's route and the outbreak of war prevented the works from commencing and the permission was extended several times with a final extension granted in 1922. Following the war, the UERL presented new proposals to construct an extension of the City and South London Railway (C&SLR, now part of the Northern line) from Clapham Common to Morden in tunnel where it would come to the surface and join the W&SR route. Both DR and C&SLR trains would run to Sutton. The plan to extend the C&SLR was opposed by the Southern Railway (SR), the operator of the mainline services through Wimbledon and Sutton. A settlement between the companies agreed that the extension of the C&SLR would end at Morden and the W&SR would be taken over and its route would be constructed by the SR.

When the Wimbledon to Sutton line was constructed by the SR in the late 1920s, Cannon Hill station was omitted from the line's stations with the nearest station being to the north at Wimbledon Chase.

Abandoned plans
Preceding station	London Underground	Following station
Merton Park towards Sutton	District line (Wimbledon & Sutton Railway)	Elm Grove towards Barking or Edgware Road

== Bibliography ==
- Jackson, Alan A. (December 1966). "The Wimbledon & Sutton Railway – A late arrival on the South London suburban scene" (PDF). The Railway Magazine. pp. 675–680.
- Wilson, Geoffrey (September 2008). "The Wimbledon & Sutton Railway" (PDF). Merton Historical Society: Bulletin 167: 10–13.
