= Wimbledon Chase railway station =

Railway station in South London

Wimbledon Chase
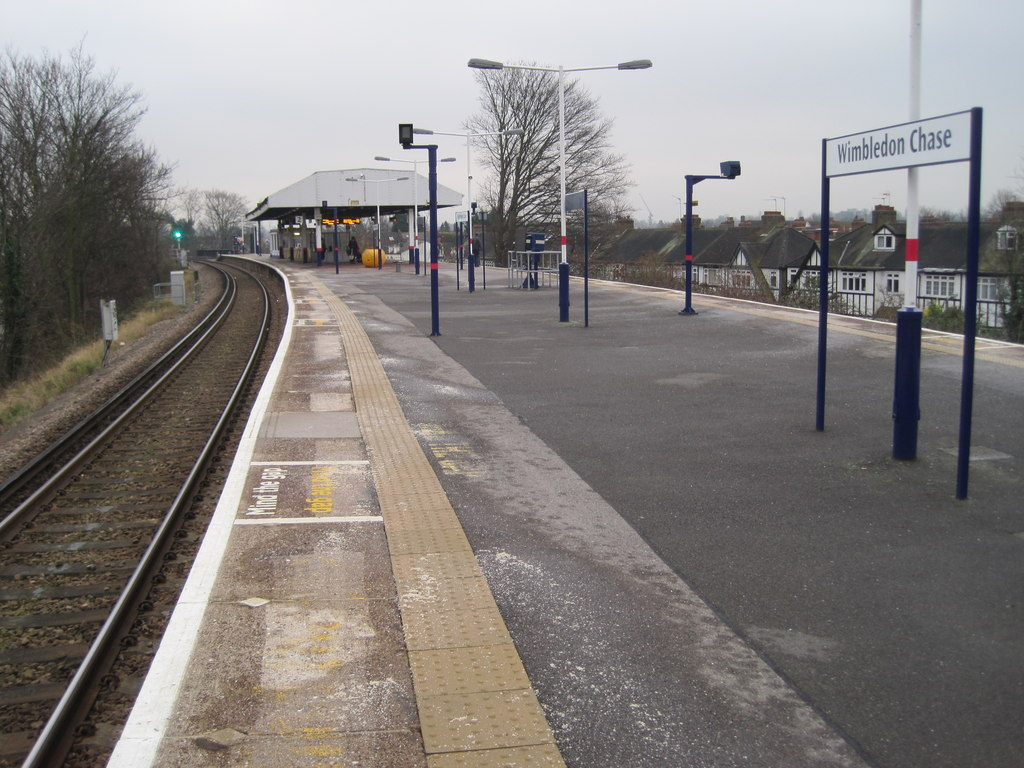
- Interactive map of Wimbledon Chase

General information
- Location: Wimbledon
- Local authority: London Borough of Merton
- Managed by: Thameslink
- Station code: WBO
- DfT category: F1
- Number of platforms: 2
- Fare zone: 3

National Rail annual entry and exit
- 2021–22: ▲0.192 million
- 2022–23: ▲0.234 million
- 2023–24: ▲0.259 million
- 2024–25: ▲0.272 million
- 2025–26: ▲0.290 million

Key dates
- 7 July 1929: Opened

Other information
- External links: Departures; Facilities
- Coordinates: 51.4095°N 0.2142°W

Wimbledon Chase railway station is in the London Borough of Merton in South London. The station is served by Thameslink trains on the Sutton Loop Line. It is in London fare zone 3 and is arranged as an island eight-car platform, with stairs descending to street level towards the southern end.

== History ==
Parliamentary approval for a line from Wimbledon to Sutton had been obtained by the Wimbledon and Sutton Railway (W&SR) in 1910 but work had been delayed by World War I. From the W&SR's inception, the District Railway (DR) was a shareholder of the company and had rights to run trains over the line when built. In the 1920s, the London Electric Railway (LER, precursor of London Underground) planned, through its ownership of the DR, to use part of the route for an extension of the City and South London Railway (C&SLR, now the Northern line) to Sutton. The SR objected and an agreement was reached that enabled the C&SLR to extend as far as Morden in exchange for the LER giving up its rights over the W&SR route. The SR subsequently built the line, one of the last to be built in the London area.

Wimbledon Chase station was not included in the original 1910 permission, stations at Elm Grove to the north and Cannon Hill to the south were planned, but were not constructed. The station opened on 7 July 1929 when the first section of the line to South Merton came into operation. The route opened to Sutton on 5 January 1930.

== Services ==
All services at Wimbledon Chase are operated by Thameslink using Class 700 EMUs.

The typical off-peak service in trains per hour is:

- 2 tph to St Albans City
- 2 tph to Sutton

A small number of late evening services are extended beyond St Albans City to Bedford and daytime services on Sundays are extended to Luton.

Preceding station	National Rail	Following station
Wimbledon	Thameslink Sutton Loop Line	South Merton
Abandoned plans
Preceding station	London Underground	Following station
Merton Park towards Sutton	District line Wimbledon & Sutton Railway	Elm Grove towards Barking or Edgware Road

== Connections ==
London Buses routes 152, 163, 164, K5 and 655 serve the station.

== Bibliography ==
- Jackson, Alan A. (December 1966). "The Wimbledon & Sutton Railway – A late arrival on the South London suburban scene" (PDF). The Railway Magazine. pp. 675–680.
- Wilson, Geoffrey (September 2008). "The Wimbledon & Sutton Railway" (PDF). Merton Historical Society: Bulletin 167: 10–13.
