= Wimbledon and Sutton Railway =

Railway company in the UK

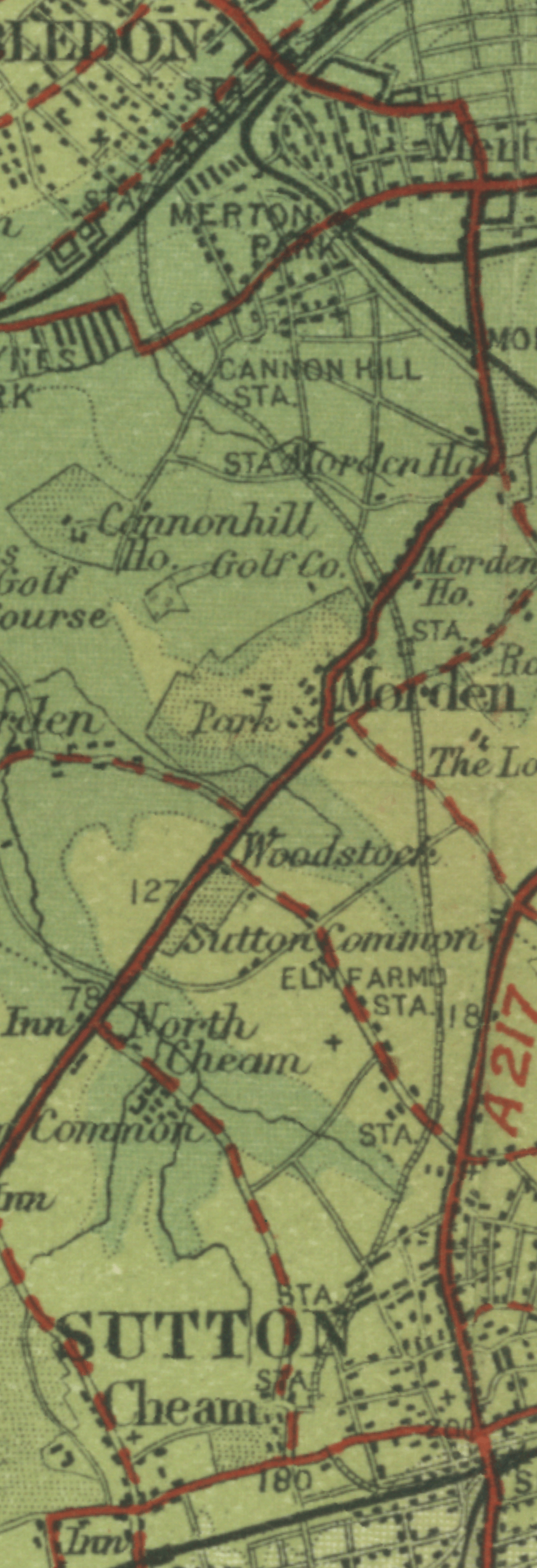
Route of the Wimbledon & Sutton Railway on an early 1920s map, showing stations approved in 1910

The Wimbledon and Sutton Railway (W&SR) was a railway company established by an act of Parliament in 1910 to build a railway line in Surrey (now south-west London) from Wimbledon to Sutton via Merton and Morden in the United Kingdom. The railway was promoted by local landowners hoping to increase their land's value through its housing development. It was initially planned that services on the railway would be operated by the London Underground's District Railway (DR) as an extension of its existing service from Wimbledon.

Delays in finding the funding, opposition from the two mainline companies that the line was intended to connect, and World War I, led to the start of construction work being delayed until 1927. The line was completed and opened in January 1930, although the planned extension of the DR was not implemented and the service was provided by the Southern Railway. The opening of the line stimulated residential development as planned. Still, competition from the London Underground's City and South London Railway, which had its terminus at Morden, meant that the line did not achieve the hoped-for passenger numbers.

Today, the railway is part of the Sutton Loop Line from Streatham through Wimbledon to Sutton.

== History ==
=== Background ===
During the second half of the 19th century, the Surrey villages of Wimbledon and Sutton experienced rapid residential growth, stimulated by the railways running through their areas, (Note: The population of Wimbledon increased from 2,693 in 1851 to 41,652 in 1901 and the population of Sutton increased from 1,387 in 1851 to 17,223 in 1901.) with landowners in both areas profiting from the development of new suburban housing on their previously rural estates. Less accessible to the railways, the parishes of Merton and Morden, which lay between Wimbledon and Sutton, remained largely rural and, starting in the 1880s, a series of railway schemes were proposed to bring a new line through the area and increase the value of the land.

Unsuccessful private bills were presented to Parliament in 1884, 1888, 1890 and 1891 seeking permission to construct a new railway between the London and South Western Railway's (L&SWR's) line through Wimbledon station to the north and the London, Brighton and South Coast Railway's (LB&SCR's) Sutton station in the south.

=== Establishment ===
On 7 October 1908, engineer H. D. Searles-Wood and Sir George Smallman organised a meeting to consider a new plan for a Wimbledon to Sutton railway, and a committee was formed to promote the plan. A further meeting, held in 1909, included landowner William Innes, nephew of John Innes, the developer of Merton Park. It was estimated that £350,000 (approximately £35.6 million today) of capital was required, only part of which was to be provided by the promoters. Some of the remainder was sought from the DR (now the London Underground's District line) which the promoters hoped would operate the service over the line by extending its service from Wimbledon. On 16 November 1909, notice of the intention to bring a private bill before Parliament was published.

The bill proposed a 5.5-mile (8.9 km) line with ten stations, to be operated by electric trains, which would provide a service taking 32 minutes to reach Waterloo from Sutton. The LB&SCR opposed the line on the grounds that it would compete with its own services from Sutton to Central London, and claimed that its own planned electrification of its lines to Victoria and London Bridge would offer quicker journeys than the W&SR route. The LB&SCR also believed that a connection for the W&SR would give the DR service the chance to extend its service to Epsom and beyond. The L&SWR had concerns that its tracks from Putney to Wimbledon, over which the DR provided the service, were already at capacity and could not cope with the extended DR service to Sutton.

Wimbledon and Sutton Railway Act 1910
- Act of Parliament
- Parliament of the United Kingdom
- Long title: An Act for incorporating the Wimbledon and Sutton Railway Company and authorising them to construct railways and works in the county of Surrey and for other purposes.
- Citation: 10 Edw. 7 & 1 Geo. 5. c. xlvii

Dates
- Royal assent: 26 July 1910

Text of statute as originally enacted

Nonetheless, the Wimbledon and Sutton Railway Act 1910 (10 Edw. 7 & 1 Geo. 5. c. xlvii) received royal assent on 26 July 1910. The act approved the railway and allowed for the L&SWR connection at Wimbledon, but did not allow for a connection to the LB&SCR at Sutton; instead the W&SR was to build a separate station with a pedestrian connection to the LB&SCR's station. Intermediate stations were approved for Elm Grove in Wimbledon, adjacent to the All England Lawn Tennis and Croquet Club's original grounds, Cannon Hill, Merton Park, Morden, Elm Farm, Sutton Common, Collingwood Road and Cheam. Power for the line was to be supplied by the Underground Electric Railways Company of London (UERL), owner of the DR, from its Lots Road Power Station.

=== Delays ===
From the beginning, the company encountered delays in implementing its plans. Neither of the two main line railway companies were interested in investing in the line, so the W&SR's promoters approached the DR for assistance. In 1911, Albert Stanley, managing director of the DR, agreed that it would finance the construction, if the promoters would guarantee a return of £6,000 per year for ten years. The DR was to cover any shortfall below 4.5 per cent return on capital. To provide additional capacity for Sutton trains on the DR's Wimbledon branch, the DR published a bill on 21 November 1911 seeking permission to construct additional tracks on the L&SWR owned section from Wimbledon to East Putney. The works were approved by the Metropolitan District Railway Act 1912 (2 & 3 Geo. 5. c. lxv), which received assent on 7 August 1912. The L&SWR was to build the additional tracks with the DR covering the cost.

On 22 November 1912, both the W&SR and the DR published notices that further bills would be submitted to extend the time limit imposed by the 1910 act for the compulsory purchase of the land needed for the railway, to enable the W&SR to raise additional capital, and to give the DR powers to take over the W&SR. The DR bill contained provisions to increase the capacity on the DR-owned section of the Wimbledon branch, by constructing further additional tracks from south of Parsons Green to south of Walham Green station (now Fulham Broadway).

The requested extension of time and other powers were granted by the Wimbledon and Sutton Railway Act 1913 (3 & 4 Geo. 5. c. xxxvii), given royal assent on 15 August 1913. In December 1912, the original promoters were replaced on the W&SR board by UERL nominees and the shares in the company were transferred to the UERL or its shareholders. In late 1913, changes were made to the track layout at Wimbledon station, including a new platform for use by the W&SR line trains, and land for the junctions with the L&SWR mainline was purchased.

On 16 November 1914, after the outbreak of war, the DR gave notice of another bill which sought a further extension of time for land purchases. The DR was also to stand guarantor for the W&SR and to lease the W&SR's undertakings, in effect taking over the W&SR. This was granted under the Metropolitan District Railway Act 1915 (5 & 6 Geo. 5. c. xxii) on 24 June 1915. War-time restrictions prevented any construction and so extensions to the earlier acts were granted each year from 1918 to 1922 to give a final date of 26 July 1924 for completion of the compulsory purchase.

=== Revised plans ===
In November 1922, notices of new bills to be placed before Parliament were published by the W&SR, and by the UERL's subsidiaries the London Electric Railway (LER) and the City and South London Railway (C&SLR, now part of the London Underground's Northern line). Taken together, the bills brought significant changes to the plans for the Wimbledon to Sutton line.

The C&SLR was an underground railway running in deep tunnels. In 1922, its line ran from Euston to Clapham Common. The C&SLR proposed to extend it for "6 miles, 1 furlong and 7.2 chains" (6.215 miles or 10.002 kilometres) from Clapham Common through Balham, Tooting, Merton (South Wimbledon) and Morden, to connect to the route of the W&SR and then continue to Sutton. The LER, C&SLR, and DR would invest in the construction of the W&SR, for which the estimated cost had risen to £1.7 million (approximately £83.5 million today). The DR would operate trains over the W&SR from Sutton to Wimbledon and thence to Central London; the C&SLR would operate trains over the southern end of the W&SR from Sutton to Morden, then via the new C&SLR extension to Clapham Common and northwards. The plans also included the construction of a depot at Morden for use by DR and C&SLR trains.

The Southern Railway (SR), successor to both the L&SWR and the LB&SCR under the 1923 grouping of railways, objected to the plan to extend the C&SLR line to Sutton – Sir Herbert Walker, General Manager of the SR, described the proposals as an "invasion" of the SR's territory allocated by the grouping agreement. Walker proposed a limited extension of the CS&LR as far as Tooting and offered to allow the C&SLR's trains to run to Wimbledon via a connection to the SR's Tooting to Wimbledon line. He also proposed that the SR should build the W&SR instead. The UERL rejected Walker's plan, claiming that the entire extension to Morden was needed as that was the only place to build the necessary depot. Without the compromise arrangement, the House of Lords rejected the whole scheme but the House of Commons, which wanted the Underground's service to be extended from Clapham, encouraged further negotiations between the UERL and SR.

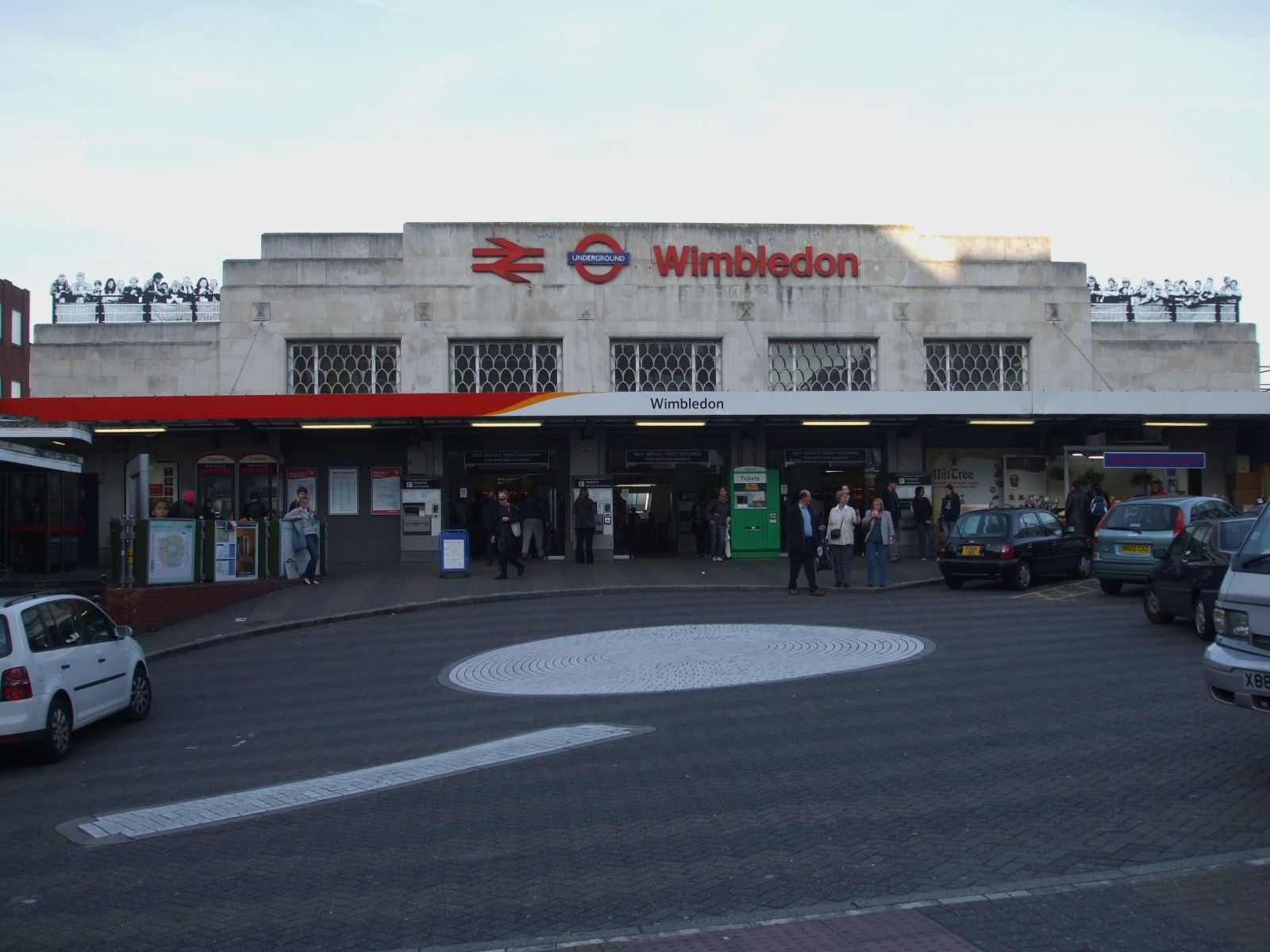
Wimbledon station, rebuilt by Southern Railway for the W&SR line

In July 1923, an agreement was made that the SR would withdraw its objection in exchange for a transfer of the UERL's interests in the W&SR. The District railway would be allowed to operate to Sutton via the W&SR route, although this was not pursued further. The Wimbledon and Sutton Railway Act 1923 (13 & 14 Geo. 5. c. xcvii), the London Electric Railway Act 1923 (13 & 14 Geo. 5. c. ciii) and the City and South London Railway Act 1923 (13 & 14 Geo. 5. c. ci) all received royal assent on 2 August 1923. The SR arranged for the take-over and winding-up of the W&SR, which was authorised by the Southern Railway Act 1924 (14 & 15 Geo. 5. c. lxvi).

The C&SLR soon started construction of its southern extension which opened to a terminus at Morden on 13 September 1926, with a depot south of the station and within 200 yards (183 m) of the W&SR route, although no connection was made between the two lines. Without the extension of the District line to Sutton, the additional tracks between Wimbledon and Putney were not required and the work was not carried out. The additional tracks between Parsons Green and Fulham Broadway were constructed, but have only been used as sidings. Once the C&SLR line was opened, the Underground company established a network of bus routes to the south, using Morden station as their hub. These routes had a significant impact on the SR's operations in the area, with the SR estimating in 1928 that it had lost approximately four million passengers per year. The UERL, though, was able to demonstrate that its passenger numbers on its buses to Sutton station were actually more than double those for Morden.

=== Construction ===
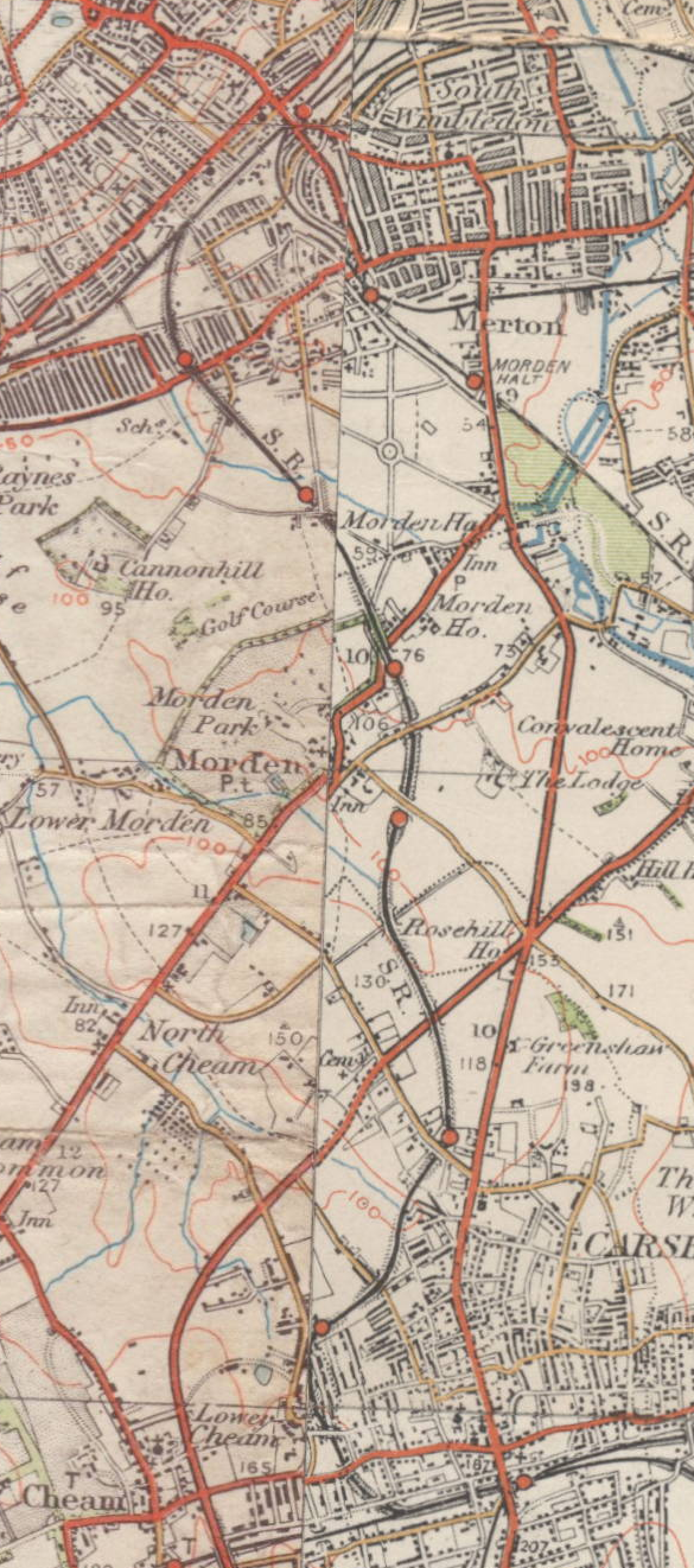
Route and stations constructed by Southern Railway on a late 1920s map

Construction of the line from Wimbledon to Sutton was slower. Work started at Wimbledon in October 1927, but property purchases were not completed until the middle of 1928 and the contractor, Sir Robert McAlpine & Sons, did not begin work at Sutton until July 1928. The landscape traversed by the line is undulating and rises from about 50 feet (15 m) above sea-level at Wimbledon to about 200 feet (61 m) at Sutton. Designed for operation exclusively by the electric multiple unit, extensive embankments and cuttings were constructed and steep gradients up to 1 in 44 (2.27%) and tight-radius curves were employed. Only 35 chains (0.438 mi or 0.705 km) of the route was built as level track and 24 bridges were required, the largest of which spans 120 feet (37 m) over the A24 close to Morden Park.

The station buildings at the two end stations, Wimbledon and Sutton, were rebuilt between 1927 and 1930 and six stations were constructed at Wimbledon Chase, South Merton, Morden South, St. Helier, Sutton Common and West Sutton. Fewer stations were built than planned in 1910 and only two of the intermediate stations (South Merton and Sutton Common) were on sites originally planned. (Note: Wimbledon Chase replaced Elm Grove and Cannon Hill. Morden South replaced Morden. St Helier replaced Elm Farm. West Sutton replaced Collingwood Road and Cheam.) With the exception of South Merton, which was built without (being accessed from the road by a long descending staircase), all stations had white stone or concrete-faced buildings, with access to the platforms by stairs up or down from street level. Provided with 520-foot (160 m) long island platforms, the stations could accommodate trains eight coaches long.

== Opening and operation ==
1920s

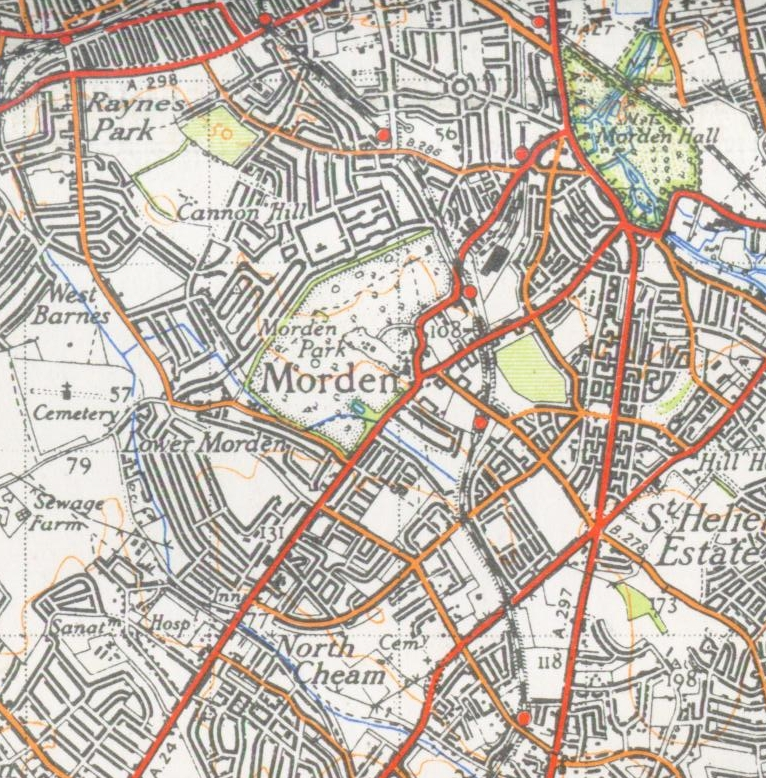
1944

Ordnance Survey maps of Morden, showing residential development

Work from Wimbledon to South Merton was completed quickly, so that services could begin running as a single-track operation on 7 July 1929. The remainder of the line opened on 5 January 1930, more than forty-five years after the first Wimbledon to Sutton link was proposed.

As hoped by the original promoters, the opening of the line stimulated the construction of new areas of private and public residential development throughout the 1930s, although large areas remain as parks and playing fields. The St. Helier Estate was completed in 1936. The opening of the Wimbledon to Sutton line and the C&SLR led the population of the parish of Morden, previously the most rural of the areas through which the lines passed, to increase from 1,355 in 1921 to 12,618 in 1931 and 35,417 in 1951.

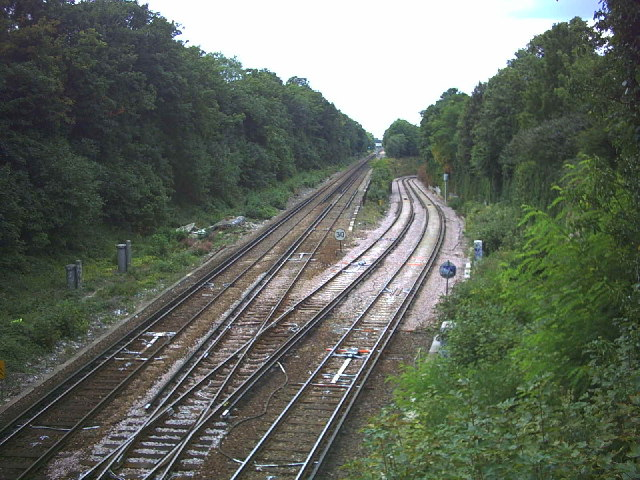
The junction of the St Helier line (right) with the Epsom line (left), showing the steep incline at this point

Ordinary ticket sales from Morden South station increased from 9,840 in 1930 to 50,817 in 1938 but, from the SR's perspective, the line was not a great success. The service, originally operating from West Croydon to Holborn Viaduct station in Central London, was slow and indirect and many of the potential passengers from the line's catchment area continued to use the buses and tube route via Morden.

Goods services operated on the line, to a goods yard at St. Helier station, until it was closed in 1963, and to an Express Dairies bottling plant adjacent to Morden South station, which opened in 1954 and closed in 1992.

The line is now called the St Helier Line, and forms part of the Sutton Loop, served by trains from Thameslink and Southern.

== Notes and references ==
=== Bibliography ===
- Barman, Christian (1979). The Man Who Built London Transport: A Biography of Frank Pick. David & Charles. ISBN 0-7153-7753-1.
- Jackson, Alan A. (December 1966). "The Wimbledon & Sutton Railway – A late arrival on the South London suburban scene" (PDF). The Railway Magazine: 675–680.
- Rose, Douglas (1999). The London Underground, A Diagrammatic History. Douglas Rose/Capital Transport. ISBN 1-85414-219-4.
