= SUC =

SUC may refer to:

- Suç, a municipality in the Mat District, Dibër County, northern Albania
- Sucs (food)
- Screwed Up Click
- State university and college (Philippines)
- Sutton Common railway station, London, National Rail station code
- Swiss University Conference
- Southern University College, a private non-profit university college in Malaysia
- Société des usines Chausson, the parent company of SECAN

== See also ==
- Succ (disambiguation)
