= Sutton Common railway station =

National Rail station in London, England

Sutton Common
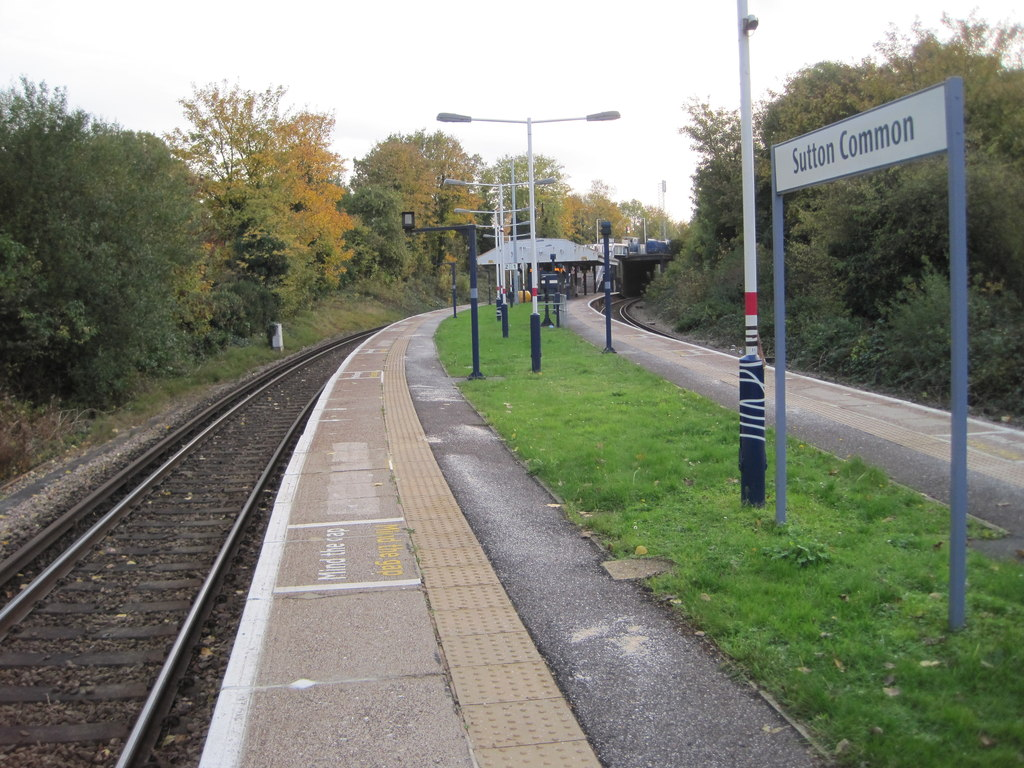
- Interactive map of Sutton Common

General information
- Location: Sutton
- Local authority: London Borough of Sutton
- Managed by: Thameslink
- Station code: SUC
- DfT category: F1
- Number of platforms: 2
- Fare zone: 4

National Rail annual entry and exit
- 2021–22: ▲0.190 million
- 2022–23: ▲0.225 million
- 2023–24: ▲0.247 million
- 2024–25: ▲0.266 million
- 2025–26: ▲0.301 million

Key dates
- 5 January 1930: Opened

Other information
- External links: Departures; Facilities
- Coordinates: 51.3751°N 0.1964°W

Sutton Common railway station is in Sutton Common in the London Borough of Sutton in South London. The station is served by Thameslink on the Sutton Loop Line. It is in London fare zone 4. It has a single stepped entrance accessible from Sutton Common Road. It is the nearest rail station to the adjoining neighbourhood, Benhilton, via the footbridge at Angel Hill.

== History ==
Parliamentary approval for a line from Wimbledon to Sutton was obtained by the Wimbledon and Sutton Railway (W&SR) in 1910 but work was delayed by the First World War. From the W&SR's inception, the District Railway (DR) was a shareholder of the company and had rights to run trains over the line when it was built. In the 1920s, the Underground Electric Railways Company of London (UERL, precursor of London Underground) planned, through its ownership of the DR, to use part of the route for an extension of another of its lines, the City and South London Railway (C&SLR, now the Northern line), to Sutton. The Southern Railway (SR) objected, and an agreement was reached that enabled the C&SLR to extend as far as Morden in exchange for the UERL giving up its rights over the W&SR route. The SR subsequently built the line, one of the last to be built in the London area.

In the original 1910 proposals, the next station to the north was to be at Elm Farm and the next station to the south at Collingwood Road. In the 1920s W&SR and UERL proposals, Elm Farm and Collingwood Road stations were omitted, the next station to the north being South Morden and the next to the south being Cheam. When the line was built by the SR, Morden South was constructed in a different location from that planned for South Morden, and Cheam station was omitted. West Sutton was added. Sutton Common station opened on 5 January 1930 when full services on the line were extended from South Merton.

In recent years the small shed-like station building has been completely demolished. The platforms are directly accessed from the street via the stairs, with a ticket machine at street level.

== Services ==
All services at Sutton Common are operated by Thameslink using Class 700 EMUs.

The typical off-peak service in trains per hour is:

- 2 tph to St Albans City
- 2 tph to Sutton

A small number of late evening services are extended beyond St Albans City to Bedford, and daytime services on Sundays are extended to Luton.

| Preceding station | National Rail | Following station |
|---|---|---|
| St Helier | Thameslink Sutton Loop Line | West Sutton |
Abandoned plans
| Preceding station | London Underground | Following station |
| Collingwood Road towards Sutton | District line (Wimbledon & Sutton Railway 1910) | Elm Farm towards Barking or Edgware Road |
| Cheam towards Sutton | District line (Wimbledon & Sutton Railway 1922) | Morden towards Barking or Edgware Road |
| Cheam towards Sutton | Northern line (City & South London Railway) | South Morden towards Edgware, Mill Hill East or High Barnet |

== Connections ==
London Buses route S3 serves the station.
