= Zucc =

Zucc or ZUCC may refer to:

- Mark Zuckerberg
- Mats Zuccarello
- Zucc., taxonomic author abbreviation of Joseph Gerhard Zuccarini (1797–1848), German botanist
- Zhejiang University City College

== See also ==
- Succ (disambiguation)
- Zuck (disambiguation)
- Zuch, a defunct motorcycle manufacturer
