= Succ =

Succ, SUCC, or S.U.C.C. may refer to:

- sucC RNA motif
- State-universal coupled cluster
- Sydney University Cricket Club
- A slang term for fellatio, derived from "suck".
- Meme Man, also known as Mr. Succ

== See also ==
- SUC (disambiguation)
- Zucc (disambiguation)
- Suck (disambiguation)
