= St Helier railway station =

National Rail station in London, England

St Helier
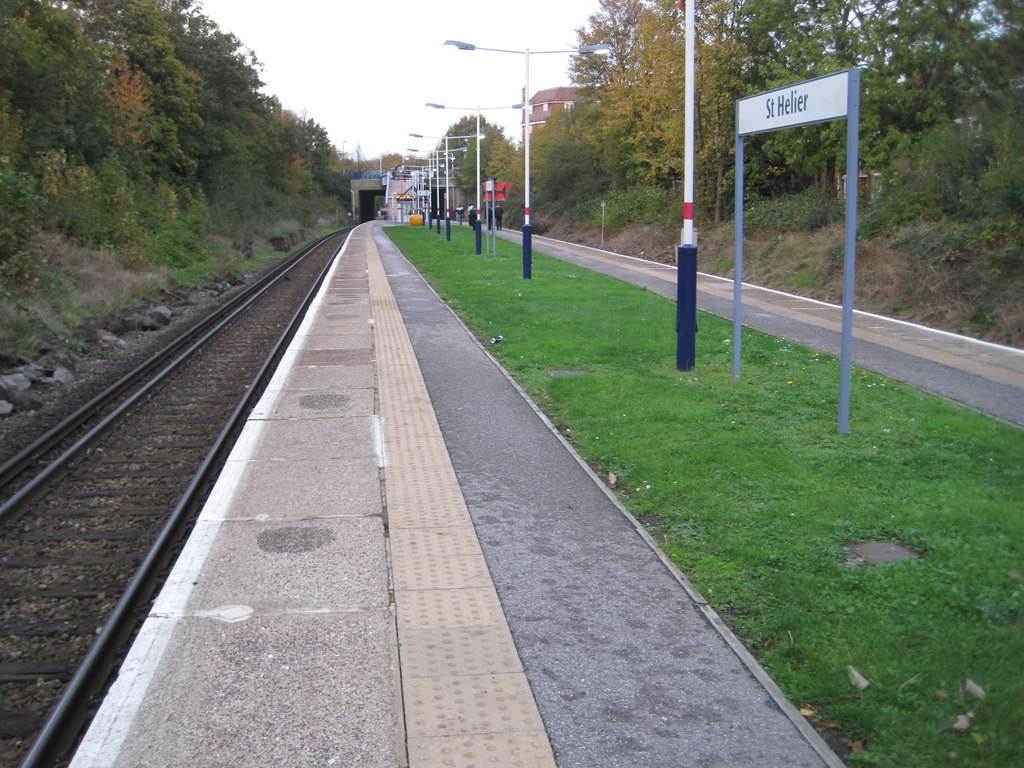
- Interactive map of St Helier

General information
- Location: St Helier
- Local authority: London Borough of Merton
- Managed by: Thameslink
- Station code: SIH
- DfT category: F1
- Number of platforms: 2
- Fare zone: 4

National Rail annual entry and exit
- 2021–22: ▲0.129 million
- 2022–23: ▲0.140 million
- 2023–24: ▲0.146 million
- 2024–25: ▲0.157 million
- 2025–26: ▲0.181 million

Key dates
- 5 January 1930: Opened

Other information
- External links: Departures; Facilities
- Coordinates: 51.3901°N 0.1985°W

St Helier railway station is in the London Borough of Merton in South London. The station is served by Thameslink, and is on the Sutton Loop Line. It is in London fare zone 4.

== History ==
Parliamentary approval for a line from Wimbledon to Sutton was obtained by the Wimbledon and Sutton Railway (W&SR) in 1910 but work was delayed by the First World War. From the W&SR's inception, the District Railway (DR) was a shareholder of the company and had rights to run trains over the line when it was built. In the 1920s, the Underground Electric Railways Company of London (UERL, precursor of London Underground) planned, through its ownership of the DR and the City and South London Railway (C&SLR, now the Northern line), to use part of the W&SR's route for an extension of the C&SLR to Sutton. The Southern Railway (SR) objected, and an agreement was reached that enabled the C&SLR to extend as far as Morden in exchange for the UERL giving up its rights over the W&SR route. The SR subsequently built the line, one of the last to be built in the London area. The station opened on 5 January 1930 when full services on the line were extended from South Merton.

The original concrete station building has been demolished.

== Services ==
All services at St Helier are operated by Thameslink using Class 700 EMUs.

The typical off-peak service in trains per hour is:

- 2 tph to St Albans City
- 2 tph to Sutton

A small number of late evening services are extended beyond St Albans City to Bedford, and daytime services on Sundays are extended to Luton.

Preceding station	National Rail	Following station
Morden South	Thameslink Sutton Loop Line	Sutton Common

== Connections ==
London Buses routes 154 and S2 serve the station.
