= South Merton railway station =

National Rail station in London, England

South Merton
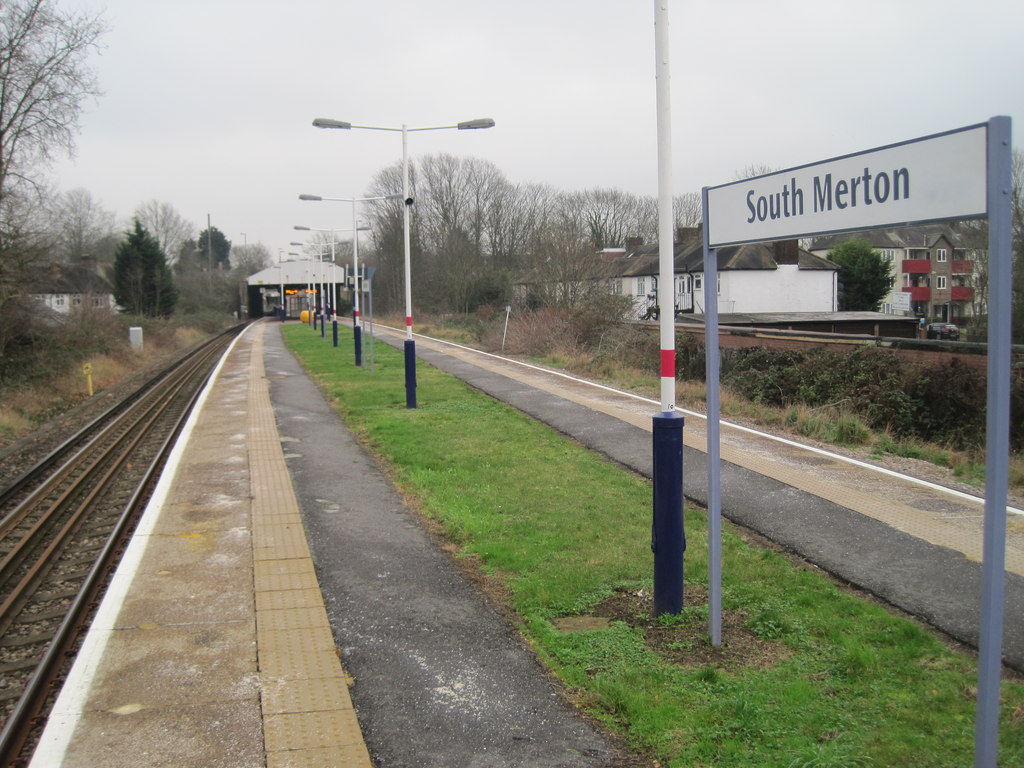
- Interactive map of South Merton

General information
- Location: Morden
- Local authority: London Borough of Merton
- Managed by: Thameslink
- Station code: SMO
- DfT category: F2
- Number of platforms: 2
- Fare zone: 4

National Rail annual entry and exit
- 2021–22: ▲89,286
- 2022–23: ▲0.109 million
- 2023–24: ▲0.117 million
- 2024–25: ▲0.125 million
- 2025–26: ▲0.151 million

Key dates
- 7 July 1929: Opened

Other information
- External links: Departures; Facilities
- Coordinates: 51.403°N 0.2062°W

South Merton railway station is located in Morden, the administrative centre of the London Borough of Merton in South London. The station is served by Thameslink trains on the Sutton Loop Line. It is in London fare zone 4.

== History ==
Parliamentary approval for a line from Wimbledon to Sutton was obtained by the Wimbledon and Sutton Railway (W&SR) in 1910 but work was delayed by the First World War. From the W&SR's inception, the District Railway (DR) was a shareholder of the company and had rights to run trains over the line when it was built. In the 1920s, the Underground Electric Railways Company of London (UERL, precursor of London Underground) planned, through its ownership of the DR and the City and South London Railway (C&SLR, now the Northern line), to use part of the W&SR's route for an extension of the C&SLR to Sutton. The Southern Railway (SR) objected, and an agreement was reached that enabled the C&SLR to extend as far as Morden in exchange for the UERL giving up its rights over the W&SR route. The SR subsequently built the line, one of the last to be built in the London area.

In the original 1910 permission, the station was named "Merton Park" (not to be confused with Merton Park on the Tooting, Merton and Wimbledon Railway to the north) due to its proximity to the Merton Park estate, then being laid out to the north, and Merton Park golf course to the south (which was subsequently developed for housing). The station opened as the temporary terminus of the line when the first section opened from Wimbledon on 7 July 1929. The remainder of the line to Sutton opened on 5 January 1930.

== Services ==
All services at South Merton are operated by Thameslink using Class 700 EMUs.

The typical off-peak service in trains per hour is:

- 2 tph to St Albans City
- 2 tph to Sutton

A small number of late evening services are extended beyond St Albans City to Bedford, and daytime services on Sundays are extended to Luton.

Preceding station	National Rail	Following station
Wimbledon Chase	Thameslink Sutton Loop Line	Morden South
Abandoned plans
Preceding station	London Underground	Following station
Morden towards Sutton	District line Wimbledon & Sutton Railway	Cannon Hill towards Barking or Edgware Road

== Connections ==
London Bus routes 164 and 413 serve the station.

The station is also about an 800m walk away from Morden Underground station which is served by the Northern line.

== Bibliography ==
- Jackson, Alan A. (December 1966). "The Wimbledon & Sutton Railway – A late arrival on the South London suburban scene" (PDF). The Railway Magazine. pp. 675–680.
- Wilson, Geoffrey (September 2008). "The Wimbledon & Sutton Railway" (PDF). Merton Historical Society: Bulletin 167: 10–13.
