= West Sutton railway station =

National Rail station in London, England

West Sutton
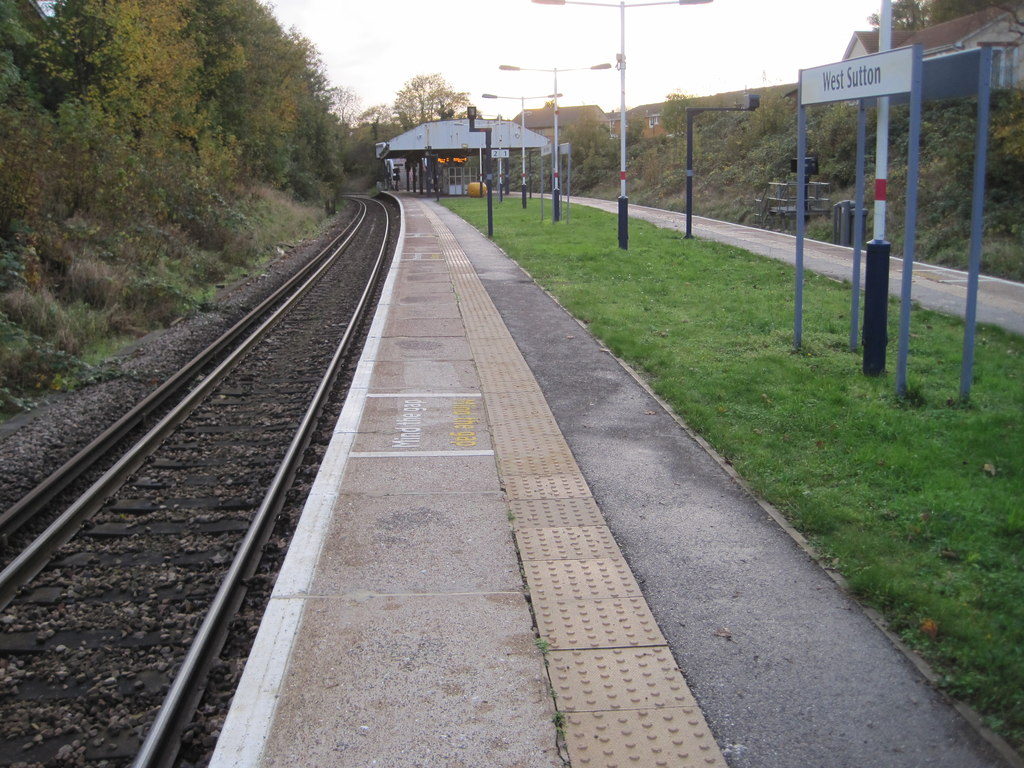
- Interactive map of West Sutton

General information
- Location: Sutton
- Local authority: London Borough of Sutton
- Managed by: Thameslink
- Station code: WSU
- DfT category: E
- Number of platforms: 2
- Fare zone: 5

National Rail annual entry and exit
- 2021–22: ▲0.184 million
- 2022–23: ▲0.225 million
- 2023–24: ▲0.257 million
- 2024–25: ▲0.266 million
- 2025–26: ▲0.307 million

Key dates
- 5 January 1930: Opened

Other information
- External links: Departures; Facilities
- Coordinates: 51.3659°N 0.2052°W

West Sutton railway station is in the London Borough of Sutton in South London, England. The station is served by Thameslink trains on the Sutton Loop Line. It is in London fare zone 5. It is close to Gander Green Lane, the home ground of Sutton United.

== History ==
Parliamentary approval for a line from Wimbledon to Sutton was obtained by the Wimbledon and Sutton Railway (W&SR) in 1910 but work was delayed by the First World War. From the W&SR's inception, the District Railway (DR) was a shareholder of the company and had rights to run trains over the line when it was built. In the 1920s, the Underground Electric Railways Company of London (UERL, precursor of London Underground) planned, through its ownership of the DR, to use part of the route for an extension of the City and South London Railway (C&SLR, now the Northern line) to Sutton. The Southern Railway (SR) objected, and an agreement was reached that enabled the C&SLR to extend as far as Morden in exchange for the UERL giving up its rights over the W&SR route. The SR subsequently built the line, one of the last to be built in the London area. West Sutton station replaced the UERL's planned Cheam station on Cheam Road to the south. The station opened on 5 January 1930 when full services on the line were extended from South Merton.

== Services ==
All services at West Sutton are operated by Thameslink using Class 700 EMUs.

The typical off-peak service in trains per hour is:

- 2 tph to St Albans City
- 2 tph to Sutton

A small number of late evening services are extended beyond St Albans City to Bedford, and daytime services on Sundays are extended to Luton.

| Preceding station | National Rail | Following station |
|---|---|---|
| Sutton Common | Thameslink Sutton Loop Line | Sutton |

== Connections ==
London Buses route 413 serve the station.
