= Zuck =

Zuck may refer to:

== People ==
- Hendrick Zuck, German footballer
- Lenore Zuck, Israeli-American computer scientist
- Mark Zuckerberg, Facebook founder and CEO
- Roy B. Zuck, American author
- Tim Zuck, Canadian artist
- Zuck Carlson, American football player

== Places ==
- Zuck, Ohio
- Chongqing Jiangbei International Airport (ICAO code: ZUCK)

== See also ==
- Bertha Zück
- Zucc (disambiguation)
