= Morden South railway station =

National Rail station in London, England

Morden South
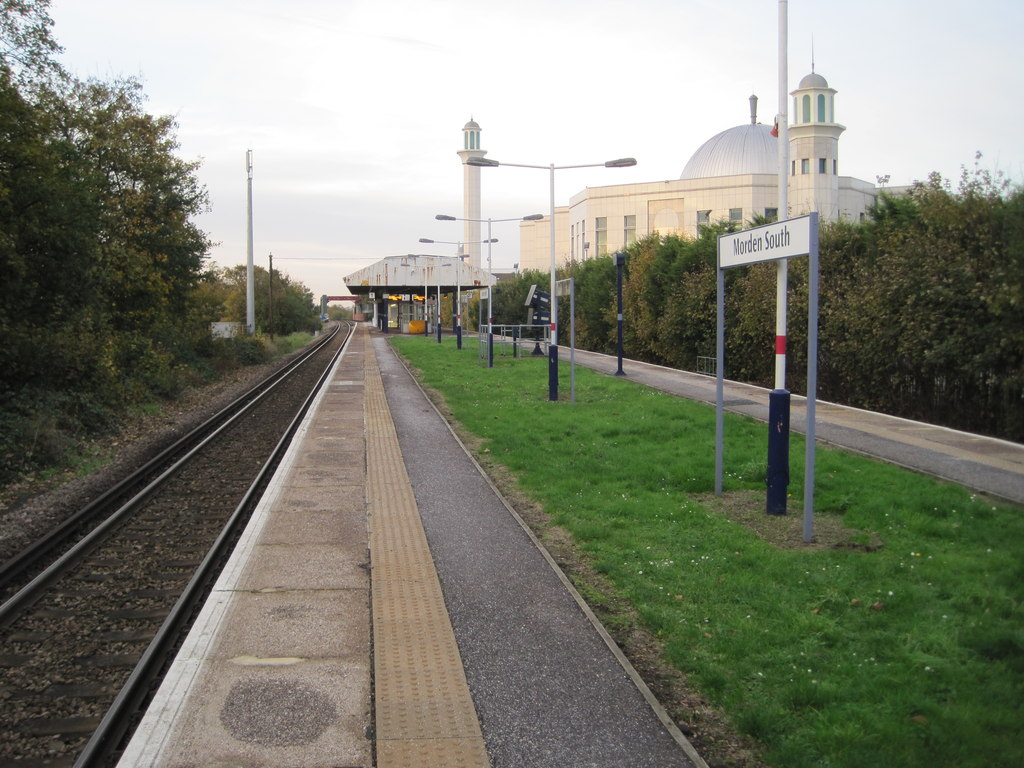
- Interactive map of Morden South

General information
- Location: Morden
- Local authority: London Borough of Merton
- Managed by: Thameslink
- Station code: MDS
- DfT category: F2
- Number of platforms: 2
- Fare zone: 4

National Rail annual entry and exit
- 2021–22: ▲54,746
- 2022–23: ▲60,938
- 2023–24: ▲69,862
- 2024–25: ▲75,948
- 2025–26: ▲84,492

Key dates
- 5 January 1930: Opened

Other information
- External links: Departures; Facilities
- Coordinates: 51.3965°N 0.199°W

Morden South railway station is in Morden in the London Borough of Merton. The station is served by Thameslink trains on the Sutton Loop Line. It is in London fare zone 4.

The station is very close to the Bait-ul-Futuh Mosque.

== History ==
Parliamentary approval for a line from Wimbledon to Sutton was obtained by the Wimbledon and Sutton Railway (W&SR) in 1910 but work was delayed by the First World War. From the W&SR's inception, the District Railway (DR) was a shareholder of the company and had rights to run trains over the line when it was built. In the 1920s, the Underground Electric Railways Company of London (UERL, precursor of London Underground) planned, through its ownership of the DR and the City and South London Railway (C&SLR, now the Northern line), to use part of the W&SR's route for an extension of the C&SLR to Sutton. The Southern Railway (SR) objected, and an agreement was reached that enabled the C&SLR to extend as far as Morden in exchange for the UERL giving up its rights over the W&SR route. The SR subsequently built the line, one of the last to be built in the London area. The station opened on 5 January 1930 when full services on the line were extended from South Merton.

In the original 1910 proposals, which predated the plans for the C&SLR extension and the London County Council's plan for the development of the St Helier estate, a different Morden station was to be built closer to the original centre of Morden village on the south side of Central Road. In the 1920s W&SR and UERL proposals, that station was renamed "South Morden". When the Wimbledon-to-Sutton line was built by the SR, the planned W&SR station was replaced by Morden South and St Helier stations.

Formerly, a siding served an Express Dairies bottling plant adjacent to the station. Until 1978, milk trains delivered milk to the plant for bottling and distribution. Shunting was latterly undertaken by Hunslet Engine Company "Yardmaster" locomotive No.HE5308/60 named David. The bottling plant closed in 1992.

In 1946, a proposal to extend the Northern line to North Cheam would have included an interchange at Morden South. This was not proceeded with.

== Services ==
All services at Morden South are operated by Thameslink using Class 700 EMUs.

The typical off-peak service in trains per hour is:

- 2 tph to St Albans City
- 2 tph to Sutton

A small number of late evening services are extended beyond St Albans City to Bedford, and daytime services on Sundays are extended to Luton.

Preceding station	National Rail	Following station
South Merton	Thameslink Sutton Loop Line	St Helier

== Connections ==
London Buses routes 80, 93 and 154 serve the station.
