= Sutton Loop Line =

Railway line in London

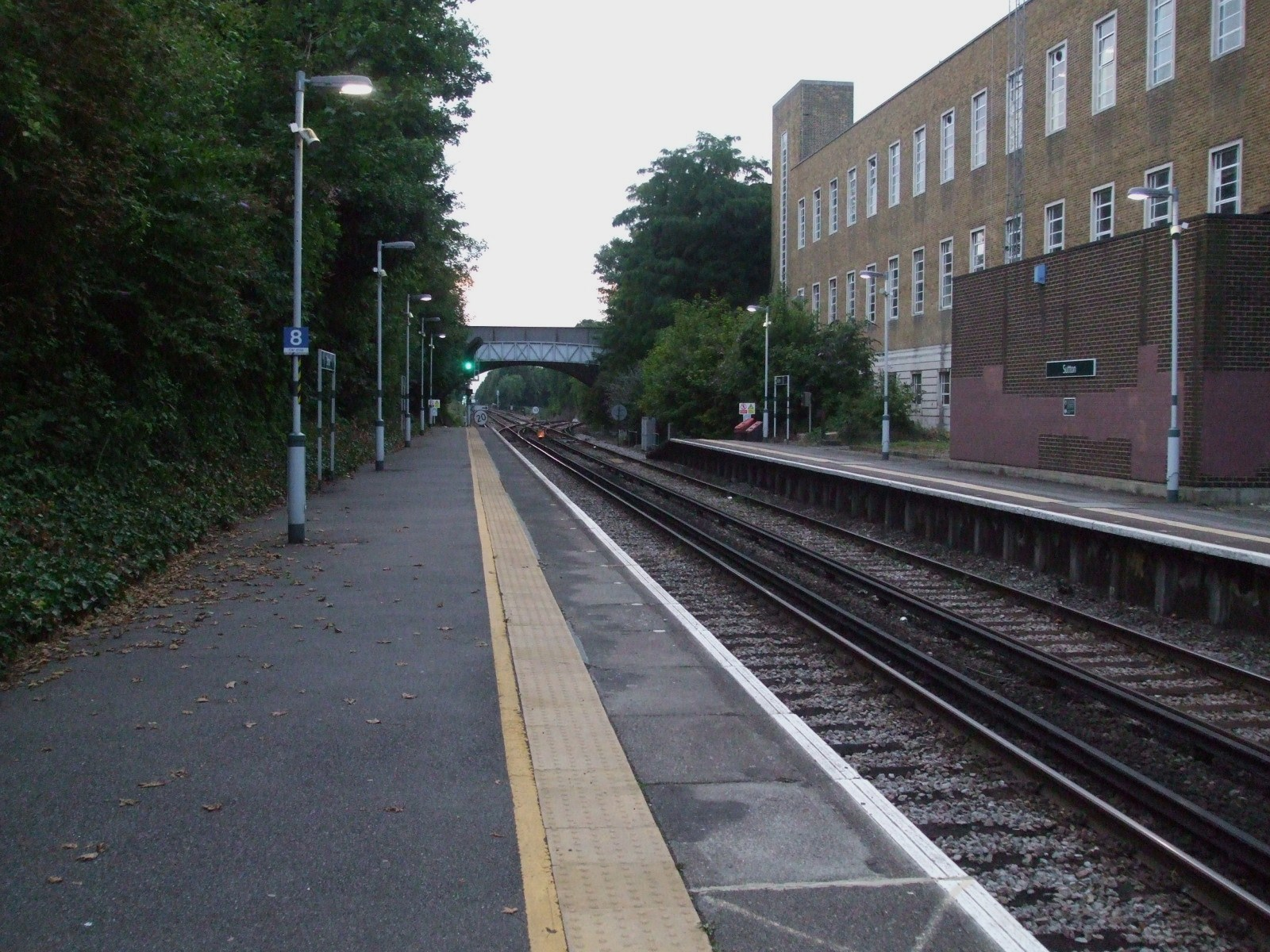
- Sutton platform 2 looking towards West junction with the St Helier Line

Overview
- Status: Operational
- Owner: Network Rail
- ELR: SMS1 (Streatham South Jn–Wimbledon); SMS2 (Wimbledon–Sutton)
- Locale: London Boroughs of Merton and Sutton
- Termini: Streatham South Jn; Sutton
- Stations: 14

Service
- Type: Heavy rail
- System: National Rail
- Services: Thameslink; Southern
- Operator: Greater Thameslink Railway
- Depots: Bedford Cauldwell for Thameslink; Selhurst for Southern
- Rolling stock: Class 377 "Electrostar"; Class 700 "Desiro City"

Technical
- Number of tracks: 2; 1 bi-directional line at Wimbledon
- Track gauge: 1,435 mm (4 ft 8 1/2 in) standard gauge
- Operating speed: Maximum 60 mph
Route map
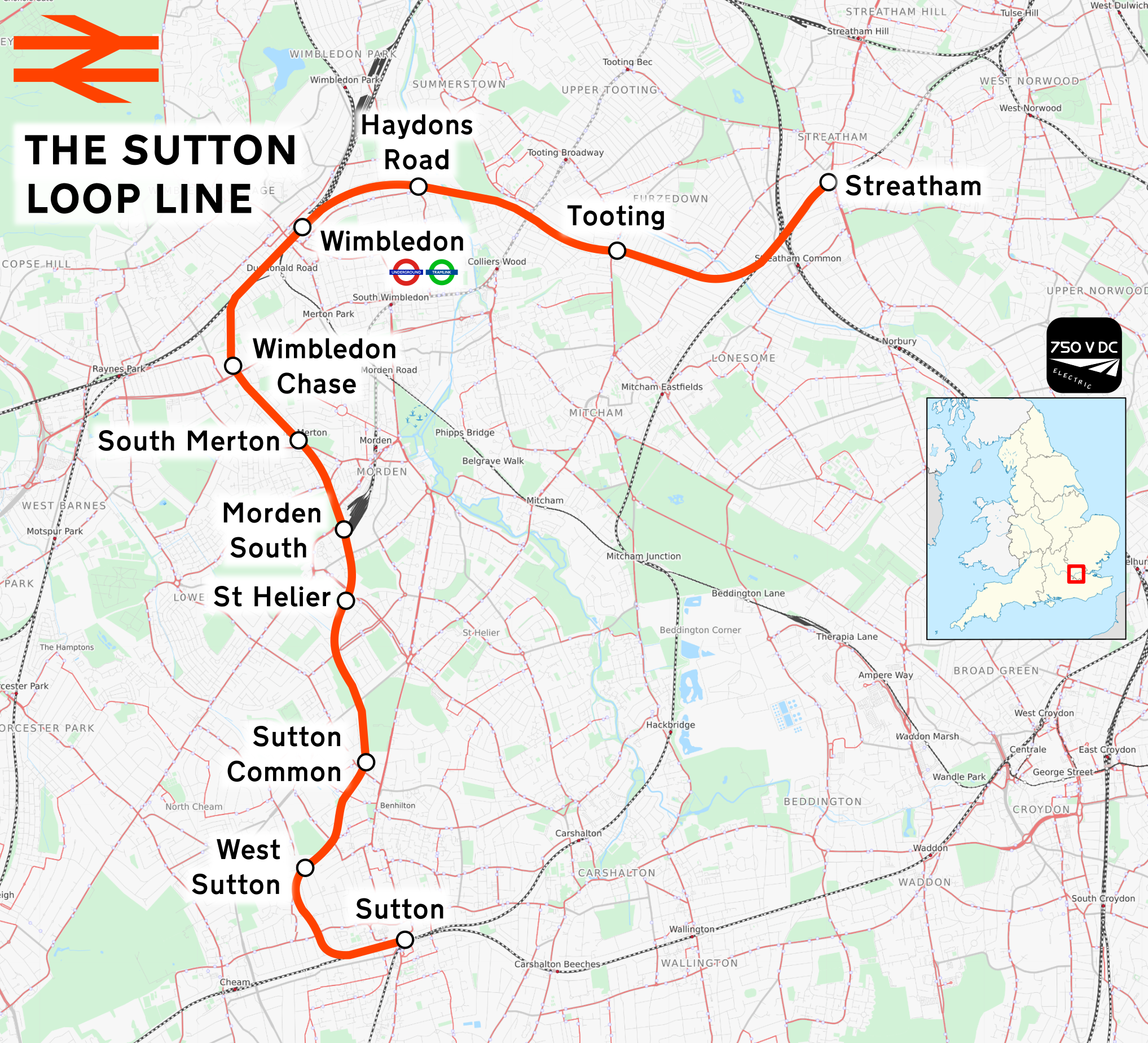
(Click to expand)

The Sutton Loop Line, also known as the Wimbledon Loop, is a railway line that diverges from the Portsmouth Line at Streatham South junction and rejoins it near Sutton station. Trains leave southwards from Streatham to enter the loop and then return going northwards. The short section between West Sutton station and West junction is known as the "Wall of Death", possibly due to the very steep concrete walls to the cutting on both sides and the sharpness of the curve which resemble the motorcycle ride at a funfair.

== Stations ==
In a clockwise direction round the loop, the stations are:

- Sutton
- West Sutton
- Sutton Common
- St Helier
- Morden South
- South Merton
- Wimbledon Chase
- Wimbledon
- Haydons Road
- Tooting

== Infrastructure ==
Traction current is supplied at 750 volts DC via the third rail. The supply for this is overseen by Selhurst Electrical Control Room. Signalling is Track Circuit Block with multiple aspect colour light signals, controlled from Three Bridges rail operating centre. The line is double track throughout, except where a short bi-directionally signalled single line section passes through Wimbledon station platform 9. Originally the Down St Helier Line used platform 10 at Wimbledon, but this is now used for the Tramlink terminus which currently comprises a single platform at the southern end, split into two sections so two trams can be held at the same time.

== Services ==
=== Thameslink ===
Thameslink runs services from St Albans, via Blackfriars round the loop. Clockwise services are described as "Sutton via Mitcham Junction" and anti-clockwise as "Sutton via Wimbledon". Occasionally, during service disruption or when the core section of the Thameslink route is closed, Sutton Loop services start and end at London Blackfriars.

Recent proposals were to increase the frequency of the Thameslink service by terminating at Blackfriars. This would have allowed the trains through the core section to be replaced with longer trains which could not use the loop, but this did not proceed due to objections from loop passengers about the withdrawal of their through service.
