= Sutton railway station (London) =

National Rail station in London, England

Sutton
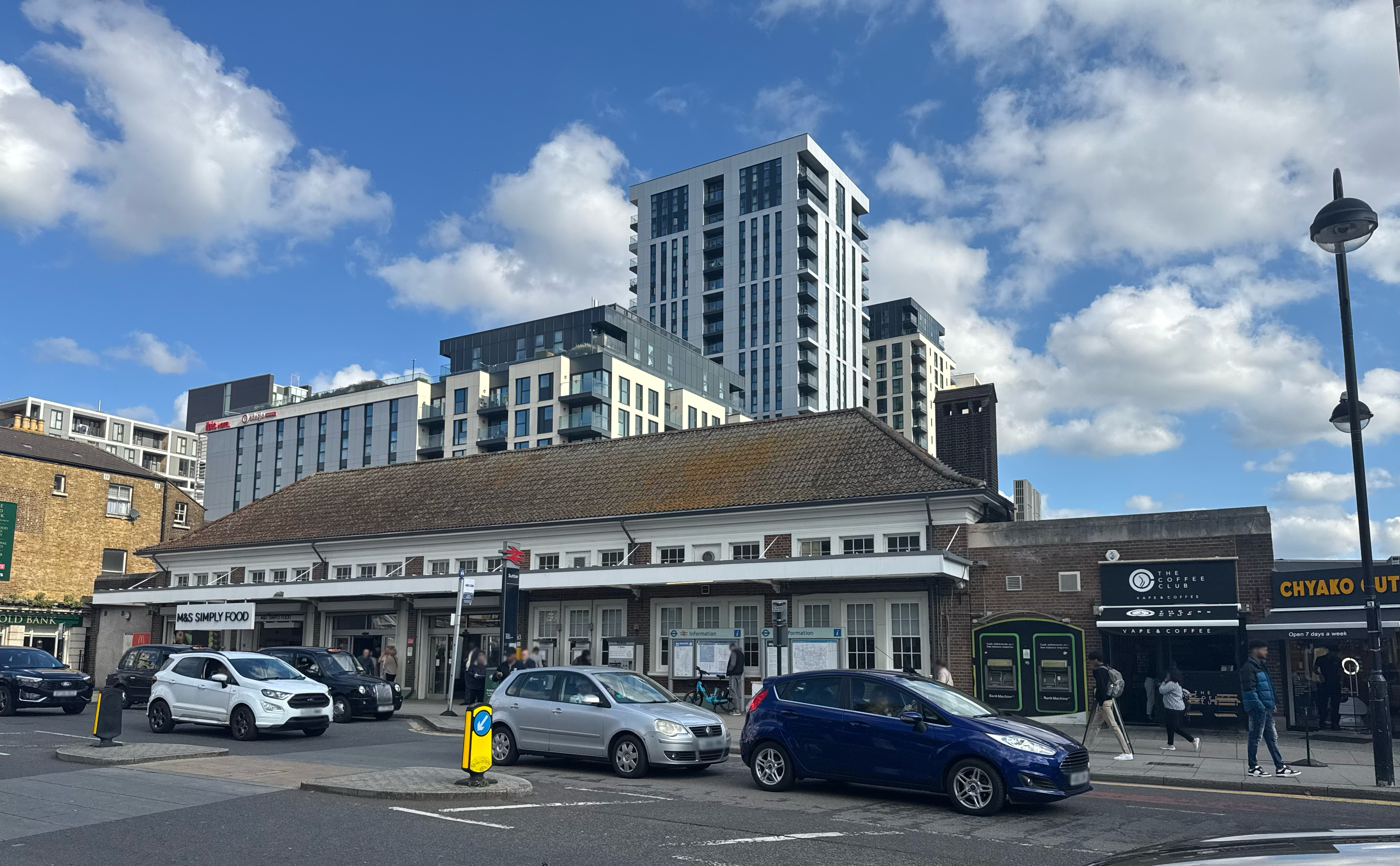
- Sutton Station - Main Building
- Interactive map of Sutton

General information
- Location: Sutton
- Local authority: London Borough of Sutton
- Managed by: Southern
- Station code: SUO
- DfT category: C2
- Number of platforms: 4
- Accessible: Yes
- Fare zone: 5

National Rail annual entry and exit
- 2020–21: ▼1.801 million
- Interchange: ▼0.153 million
- 2021–22: ▲3.692 million
- Interchange: ▲0.336 million
- 2022–23: ▲4.340 million
- Interchange: ▲0.359 million
- 2023–24: ▲4.491 million
- Interchange: ▲0.426 million
- 2024–25: ▲4.640 million
- Interchange: ▲0.901 million

Key dates
- 10 May 1847: Opened (LB&SCR)
- 22 May 1865: Start (Epsom Downs line)
- 1 October 1868: Start (Mitcham Junction line)
- 5 January 1930: Start (Wimbledon line)

Other information
- External links: Departures; Facilities
- Coordinates: 51.3601°N 0.1903°W

Sutton railway station (sometimes referred to as Sutton (Surrey) on tickets and timetables) is in the London Borough of Sutton in South London and is the main station serving the town of Sutton. It is served by Southern and Thameslink trains, and lies in London fare zone 5, 14 miles 75 chains (14.94 miles, 24.04 km) down the line from London Bridge, measured via Forest Hill.

== History ==
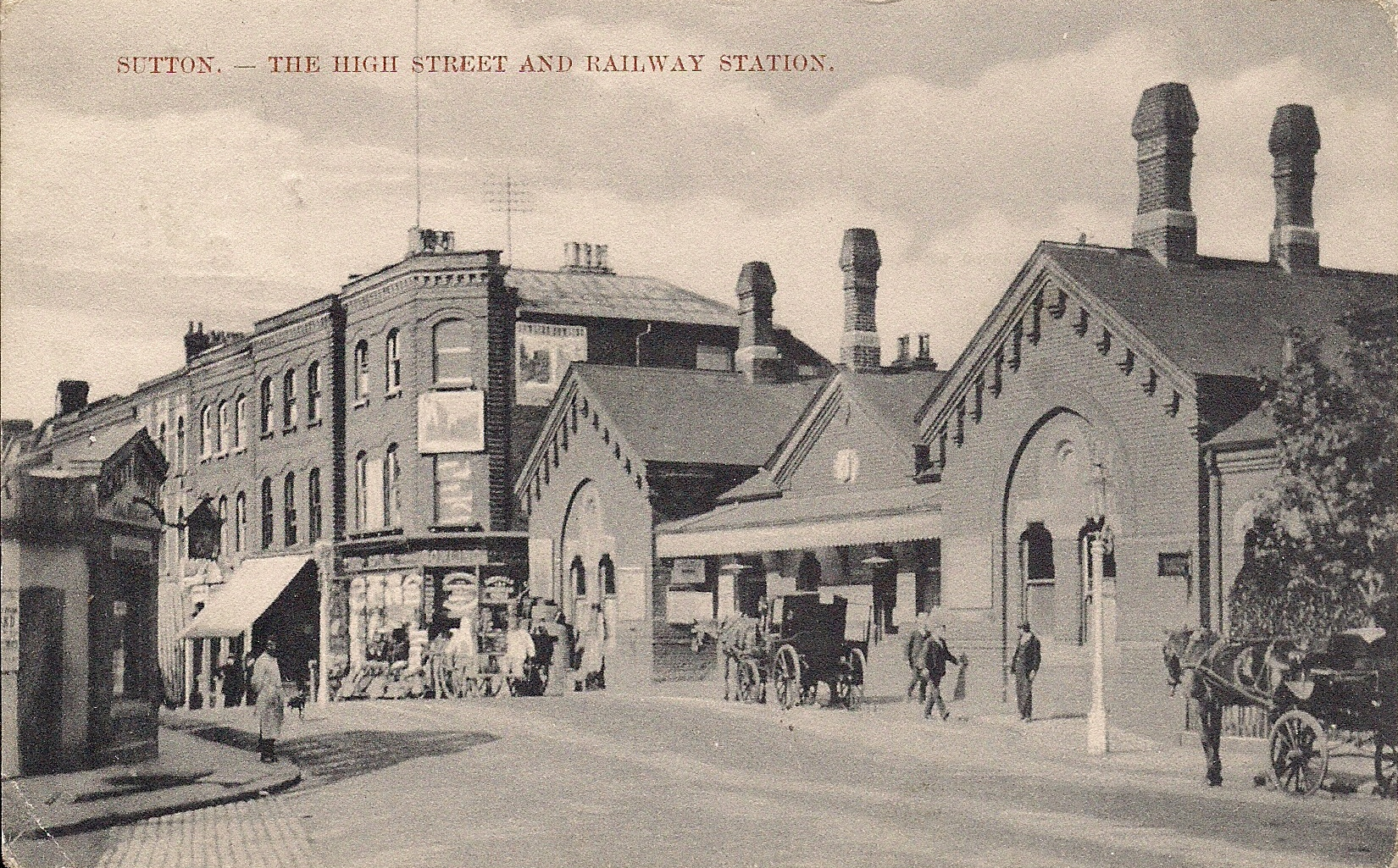
The former Sutton station in a 1905 postcard

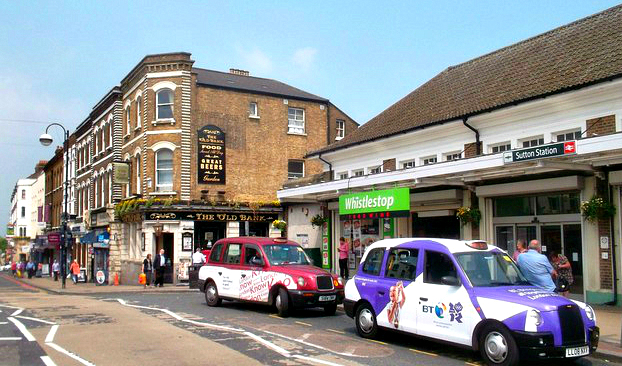
The present day Sutton station

Sutton station was opened by the London, Brighton and South Coast Railway (LB&SCR) on 10 May 1847, when the railway opened its line from West Croydon to Epsom. A branch to Epsom Downs was opened on 22 May 1865, followed by a line to Mitcham Junction on 1 October 1868. The final change to the station came when the branch to Wimbledon opened on 5 January 1930.

Until the early 1980s, it was possible to catch a direct express train to the coast from Sutton to Bognor Regis, Chichester or Portsmouth. Since the mid-1980s, these express services have been routed via East Croydon in order to serve Gatwick Airport; passengers from Sutton for the south coast now have to change at Horsham, or alternatively travel to West Croydon station and walk, take the bus or use Croydon's Tramlink service to reach East Croydon station to continue from there.

Today, according to the official National Rail website, travel to London Victoria takes at least 33 minutes on the direct route via Carshalton and Hackbridge.

=== Layout ===
The four platforms at Sutton station are numbered 1 to 4 from north to south. Platforms 1 and 2 are on the lines to Wimbledon, Epsom, Leatherhead, Dorking, and Horsham. Platforms 3 and 4 are on the Epsom Downs Line, which becomes single-track about 0.5 miles (0.8 km) south of the station. Platforms 1 and 3 are used by services from outer termini to Central London. Trains from Central London use platforms 2 and 4. Terminating trains which return to central London generally use platform 4.

Platforms 1 and 2 can accommodate 12-coach trains, and were used by the express services to Bognor Regis and Portsmouth Harbour until they were diverted in the early 1980s to serve Gatwick Airport. Nowadays all trains calling at Sutton are formed of ten coaches or fewer. At the London end of platform 1, there are the remains of a fifth platform, which was a bay for local services via Mitcham Junction.

Two waiting rooms serve the station. An M&S Food to Go shop sits adjacent to the concourse within the station building.

Three lifts serve all platforms – one each for platforms one, two/three and four.

The installation of a side entrance serving the Quadrant was completed in summer 2014.

=== Wimbledon branch ===
Parliamentary approval for a line from Wimbledon to Sutton had been obtained by the Wimbledon and Sutton Railway (W&SR) in 1910, but work had been delayed by the First World War. From the W&SR's inception, the District Railway (DR, now the District line) was a shareholder of the company and had rights to run trains over the line when built. In the 1920s, the Underground Electric Railways Company of London (UERL, precursor of London Underground) planned, through its ownership of the DR, to use part of the route for an extension of the City and South London Railway (C&SLR, now the Northern line) to Sutton.This would have created a Sutton Underground Station.

The SR objected and an agreement was reached that enabled the C&SLR to extend as far as Morden in exchange for the UERL giving up its rights over the W&SR route. The SR subsequently built the line, one of the last to be built in the London area. In both the 1910 and 1920s proposals, the next station towards Wimbledon was to be Cheam on Cheam Road, but the SR dropped this station and replaced it with West Sutton station. The line opened on 5 January 1930 when full services on the line were extended from South Merton.

== Services ==
Services at Sutton are operated by Southern and Thameslink using Class 377 and 700 EMUs.

The typical off-peak service in trains per hour is:

- 4 tph to London Victoria (2 run via Hackbridge and 2 run via Norbury)
- 2 tph to London Bridge (non-stop from Norwood Junction)
- 4 tph to St Albans City (2 of these run via Hackbridge and 2 run via Wimbledon)
- 2 tph to Epsom
- 2 tph to Epsom Downs
- 2 tph to Dorking of which 1 continues to Horsham

During the peak hours, the station is served by an additional half-hourly service to London Victoria via Norbury and a half-hourly service between Epsom and London Victoria via Hackbridge.

On Saturday evenings (after approximately 18:45) and on Sundays, there is no service south of Dorking to Horsham.

Preceding station	National Rail	Following station
Carshalton or Carshalton Beeches	Southern Sutton & Mole Valley Lines	Cheam or Terminus
Carshalton Beeches	Southern Epsom Downs Branch	Belmont
Carshalton	Thameslink Sutton Loop Line	West Sutton
	Disused railways	
Epsom	Network SouthEast Thameslink	Wallington
Abandoned plans
Preceding station	London Underground	Following station
Terminus	District line	Cheam towards Barking or Edgware Road
Terminus	Northern line (City & South London Railway)	Cheam towards Edgware or Highgate

== Connections ==
London Buses routes 80, 164, 280, 470, S1, S2, S3 and S4, night route N44 and non-TFL routes 420 and 820 serve the station.

== Future ==
A planned extension to the Tramlink light rail or a separate bus rapid transit (BRT) system called the Sutton Link will create a new tram or BRT/rail interchange in Sutton, offering services to South Wimbledon via St Helier.

In 2018, Transport for London (TfL) proposed three routes for the Sutton Link project, targeting South Wimbledon, Colliers Wood, and Wimbledon. In February 2020, TfL approved the route to Colliers Wood. According to a now-deleted consultation, the Sutton Link was expected to reduce public transport journey times from Sutton town centre to Colliers Wood by up to 18 minutes (a 50% reduction) and could accommodate approximately 2,200 passengers per hour. However, the project was paused later in 2020 due to funding challenges arising from the COVID-19 pandemic. In 2024, the newly elected MP for Sutton, Luke Taylor, pledged to lobby to make it happen.

Colliers Wood to Sutton (Proposed Route 2)
- Terminus: Sutton
- Belgrave Walk (Access to Croydon / Wimbledon Tram Change)
- Colliers Wood (Access to Northern Line)

Then back to Sutton
