= Edgware Road tube station (Circle, District and Hammersmith & City lines) =

London Underground station

Edgware Road
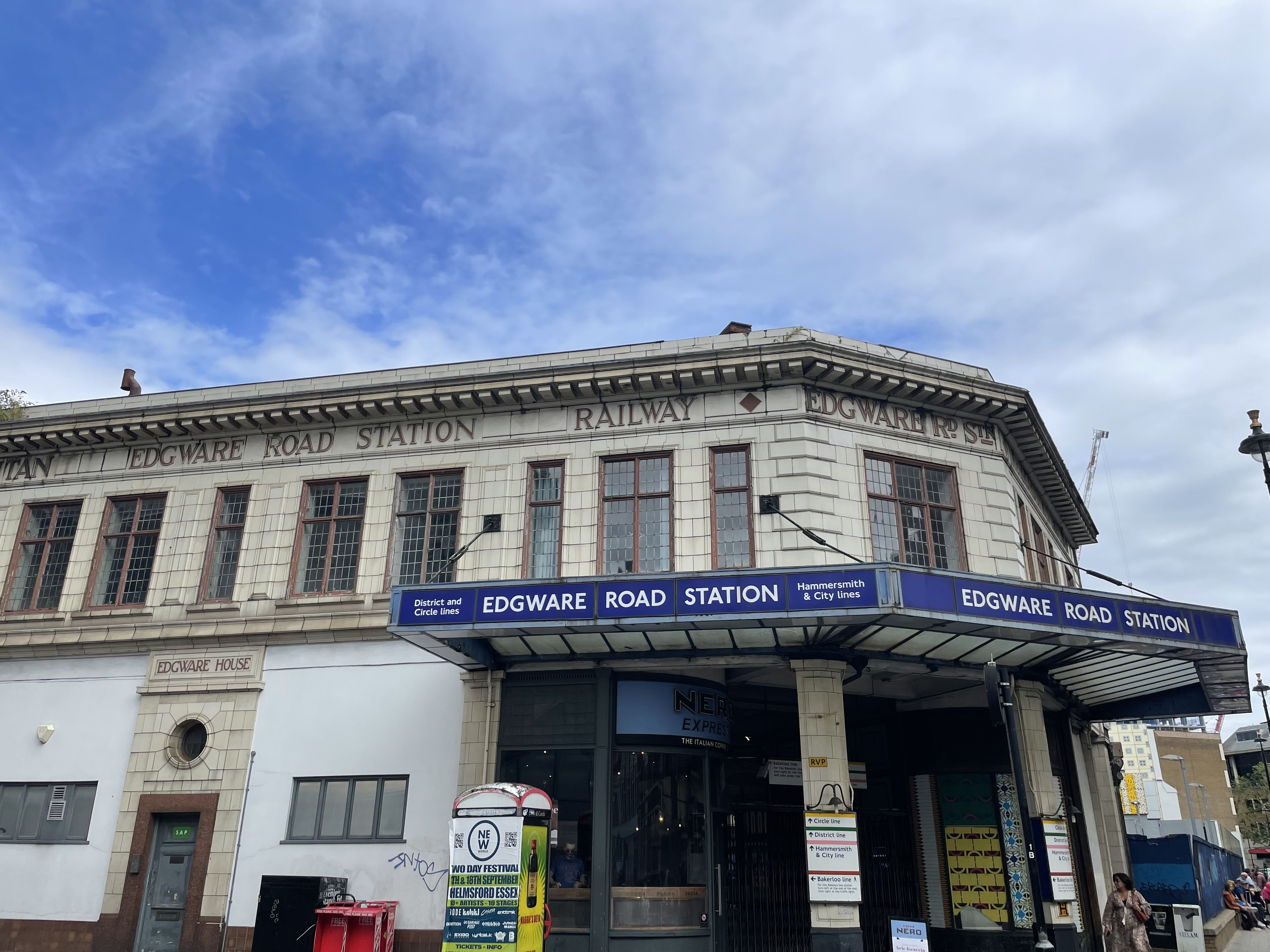
- Station entrance
- Interactive map of Edgware Road

General information
- Location: Edgware Road
- Local authority: City of Westminster
- Managed by: London Underground
- Number of platforms: 4
- Fare zone: 1
- OSI: Edgware Road (Bakerloo); Marylebone

London Underground annual entry and exit
- 2021: 2.84 million
- 2022: ▲5.07 million
- 2023: ▲5.68 million
- 2024: ▲5.71 million
- 2025: ▲6.06 million

Key dates
- 10 January 1863: Opened

Other information
- External links: TfL station info page
- Coordinates: 51.5200°N 0.1678°W

Edgware Road (/ˈɛdʒwɛər ˈroʊd/) is a London Underground station on the Circle, District and Hammersmith & City lines, located on the corner of Chapel Street and Cabbell Street.

A separate station of the same name but served by the Bakerloo line is located about 164 yards (150 m) away on the opposite side of Marylebone Road. There have been proposals to rename one of the stations to avoid confusion. There is also an Edgware station, the northern terminus of the Edgware branch of the Northern line.

== History ==
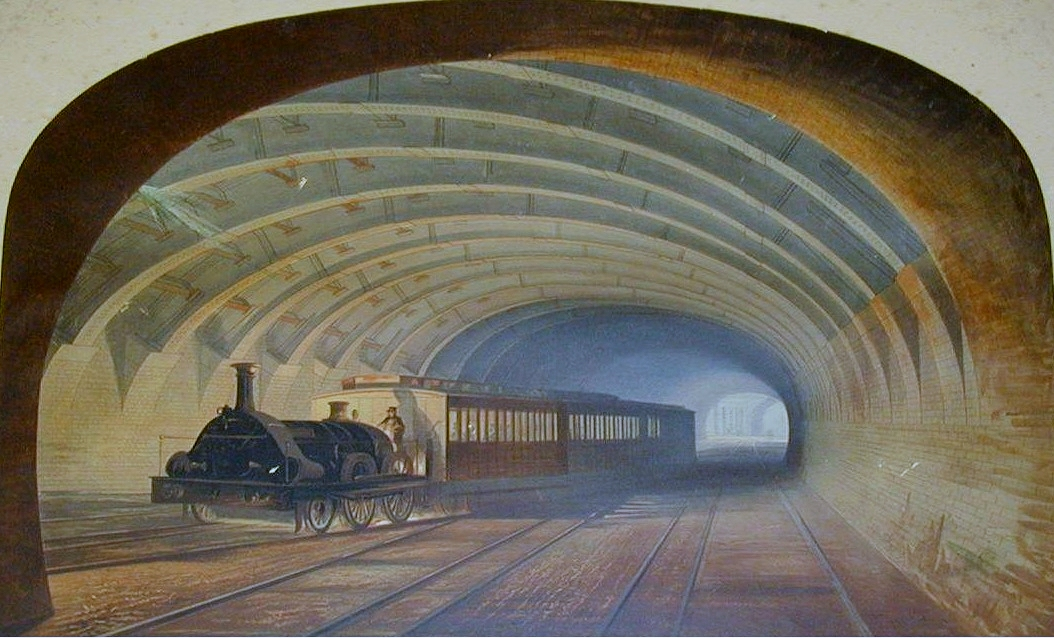
Metropolitan locomotive leaving Edgware Road, at the junction beneath Praed Street

This station was part of the world's first underground railway when it was opened as part of the Metropolitan Railway between Paddington and Farringdon on 10 January 1863.

The station was rebuilt in 1926-8 for the introduction of District services with a new street level building by Charles Walter Clark replacing the original 1863 building designed by Sir John Fowler.

It was the site of one of the 7 July 2005 London bombings. A terrorist bomb was detonated on board a westbound Circle line train as it was leaving the station; it killed six passengers.

== Layout ==
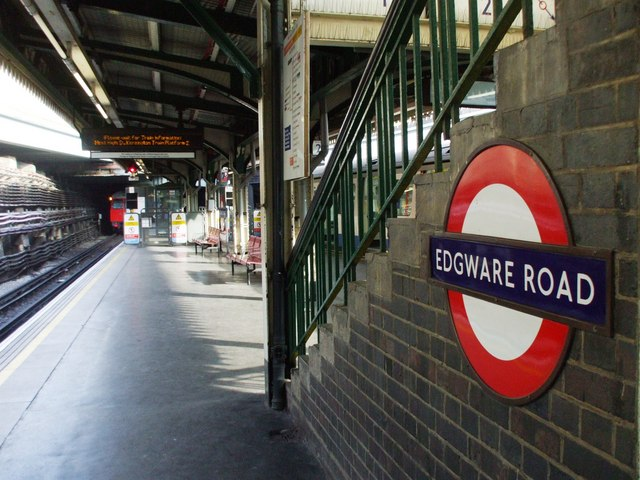
Ths station's interior

The station lies in a cutting open to the elements, serving the cut-and-cover routes of the Hammersmith & City, Circle and District lines; it forms the northern terminus for the District line's service to Wimbledon. All District line trains terminate at Wimbledon; passengers must change at Earl's Court for Ealing Broadway, Upminster, and Richmond.

To the east of the station, the Circle and Hammersmith & City lines share the same tracks towards Baker Street. To the west all four lines run to Paddington, but the routes to Hammersmith and the Circle and District line trains via High Street Kensington diverge at Praed Street Junction to separate stations within the Paddington complex.

Since December 2009, Circle line trains call at the station twice on each journey: initially as a through service from Hammersmith towards Liverpool Street, then as the terminus for that same service completing the loop via Victoria (or the same journey in reverse). There are no longer through trains here between the northern part of the Circle line and its western part.

The usual service pattern is: platform 1 for eastbound services to Kings Cross, Liverpool Street and beyond, platform 2 for District line trains to Earl's Court and Wimbledon, platform 3 for Circle line to High Street Kensington and Victoria, and platform 4 for westbound services to Shepherd's Bush Market and Hammersmith. This may vary in times of disruption; trains can go east from platforms 1, 2 and 3 and to any of the westbound destinations from platforms 2, 3 or 4, but only platforms 2 and 3 can be used to reverse trains.

== Services ==
=== Circle line ===
Prior to 13 December 2009, the Circle line trains travelled in both directions around a simple loop with 27 stations and 12.9 miles (20.8 km) of track. On this date, the Circle line was then extended to include the Hammersmith & City route from Edgware Road to Hammersmith. Rather than continuously running around the circle, trains now travel from Hammersmith to Edgware Road, generally going around the circle once before terminating at Edgware Road, and returning via the same route; occasional trains may also continue clockwise through Edgware Road to additional stations. Service operation was changed to improve reliability and increase the service frequency on the Hammersmith branch.

The general daytime service pattern in trains per hour (tph) is:

- 6 tph via High Street Kensington (anti-clockwise)
- 6 tph via Kings Cross St Pancras (clockwise)
- 6 tph to Hammersmith (anti-clockwise).

=== District line ===
Edgware Road is the terminus for all District line services via High Street Kensington. The general daytime service pattern is:

- 6 tph Wimbledon (westbound).

=== Hammersmith & City line ===
The general daytime service pattern is:

- 6 tph to Barking (eastbound)
- 6 tph to Hammersmith (westbound).

Through services
Preceding station	London Underground	Following station
Paddington towards Hammersmith	Circle line	Baker Street towards Edgware Road via Aldgate
Paddington towards Hammersmith	Hammersmith & City line	Baker Street towards Barking
Terminating services
Preceding station	London Underground	Following station
Paddington towards Hammersmith via Tower Hill	Circle line	Terminus
Paddington towards Wimbledon	District line Edgware Road branch	Terminus
Former services
Preceding station	London Underground	Following station
Paddington towards Hammersmith	Metropolitan line Hammersmith branch (1864–1990)	Baker Street towards Barking

== Artwork ==
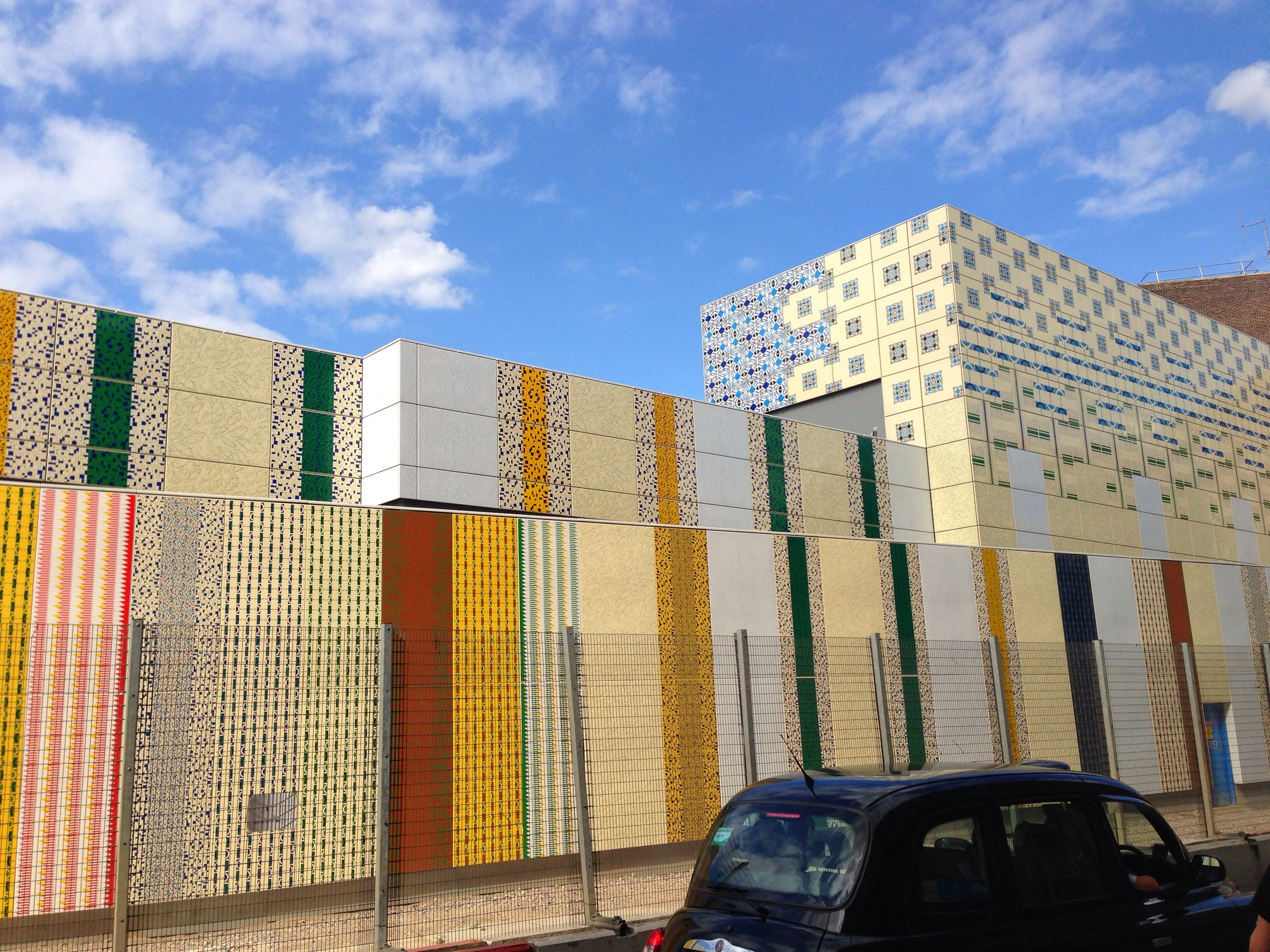
Wrapper by Jacqueline Poncelet

As part of the introduction of the S7 and S8 Stock trains to the Circle, District, Hammersmith & City and Metropolitan lines in the early 2010s, power upgrades required the construction of a large electrical substation adjacent to the station.

Art on the Underground commissioned artist Jacqueline Poncelet to produce designs for the 1,500 m^{2} (16,000 sq ft) of vitreous enamel cladding that would become the outer shell of the substation. The artwork Wrapper was unveiled in November 2012; a mosaic of 700 decorated panels of various patterns inspired by local history.

== See also ==
- 7 July 2005 London bombings
