= 1926 in architecture =

The year 1926 in architecture involved some significant architectural events and new buildings.

== Events ==
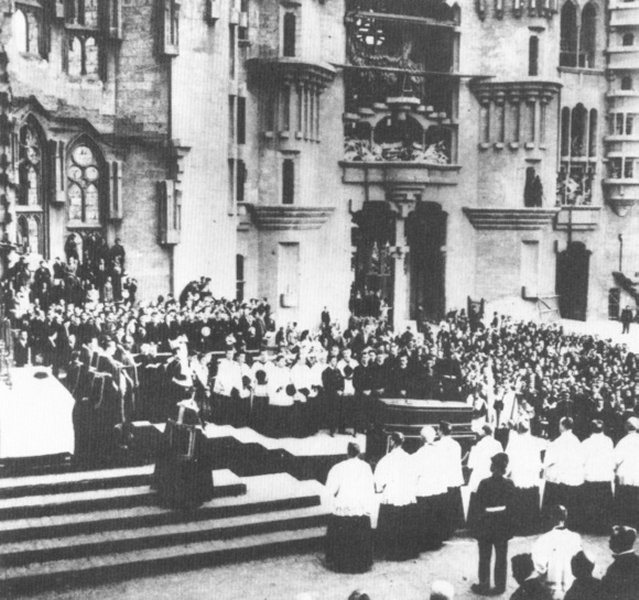
Gaudí's funeral

- c. February – British General Post Office K2 red telephone box, designed by Giles Gilbert Scott, is introduced, chiefly in the London area.
- April–May – The German Zehner-Ring group of Modernist architects expands to become Der Ring.
- June 7 – While walking along the Gran Via de les Corts Catalanes in Barcelona, Antoni Gaudí is struck by a passing tram and knocked unconscious. Delays in receiving medical treatment contribute to his death in hospital a few days later. On June 12, after a funeral procession through the streets of Barcelona lined by thousands, he is buried in the crypt chapel of his unfinished church of Sagrada Família.
- November 27 – In Williamsburg, Virginia, the restoration of Colonial Williamsburg begins.
- Undated
  - The Frankfurt kitchen is designed by Margarete Schütte-Lihotzky for Ernst May's social housing project New Frankfurt in Frankfurt, Germany.
  - The Russian avant-garde magazine SA is published for the first time.
  - Restoration of the Tudor Owlpen Manor in the Cotswolds of England by Norman Jewson is completed.

== Buildings and structures ==
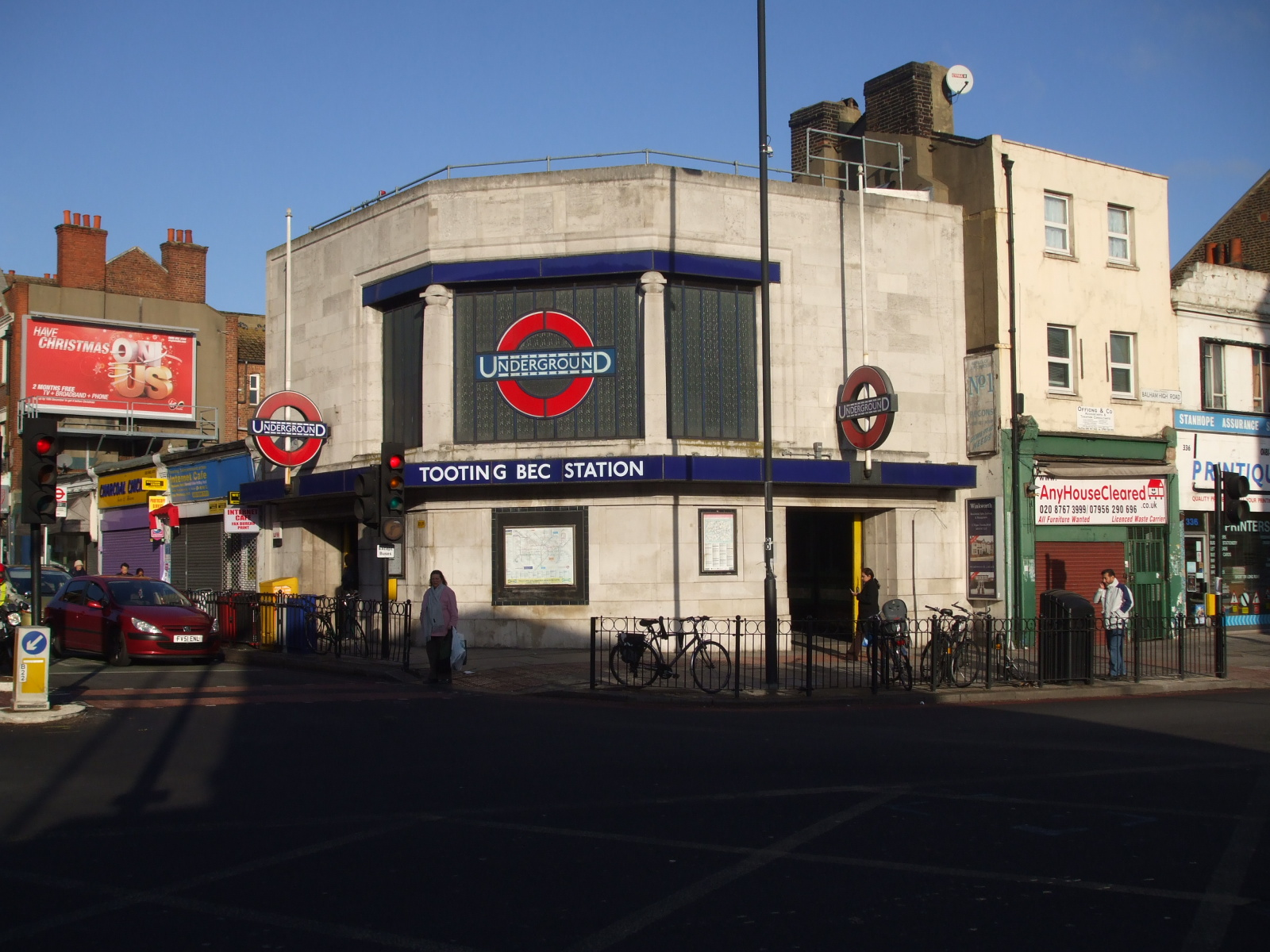
Tooting Bec station

=== Buildings opened ===
- May 13 – Hercilio Luz Bridge, Florianopolis, Brazil, designed by Robinson & Steinman.
- September 13 – Clapham South, Tooting Bec, Tooting Broadway, Colliers Wood, South Wimbledon and Morden tube stations, London, designed by Charles Holden (also Balham, opened December 6).
- October 3 – City Methodist Church (Gary, Indiana), designed by Lowe and Bollenbacher.
- November 11 – Northampton War Memorial, designed by Edwin Lutyens, unveiled in England.
- December 4 – Bauhaus Dessau building, designed by Walter Gropius, opened in Dessau, Germany.

=== Buildings completed ===
- Mausoleum of Yugoslavian Soldiers in Olomouc, designed by Hubert Aust
- Church of The English Martyrs (Roman Catholic), Reading, Berkshire, England, designed by Wilfred C. Mangan
- Southwestern Bell Building, downtown St. Louis, Missouri, USA, designed by Mauran, Russell & Crowell with I.R. Timlin
- Sourdough Inn, Fort Yukon, Alaska, USA
- Remodeling of Twin Peaks, 102 Bedford Street, Greenwich Village, New York City, USA, by Clifford Reed Daily
- 900 Stewart Avenue (Ithaca, New York), USA
- New Ways (house for Wenman Joseph Bassett-Lowke), 508 Wellingborough Road, Northampton, England, designed by Peter Behrens, "a pioneer of modern architecture in Britain"
- Villa Wolf in Gubin, Poland, designed by Ludwig Mies van der Rohe

== Awards ==
- RIBA Royal Gold Medal – Ragnar Ostberg.
- Grand Prix de Rome, architecture: Jean-Baptiste Hourlier.

== Births ==
- 21 January – Roger Taillibert, French architect (died 2019)
- 8 April – Henry N. Cobb, American architect (died 2020)
- 15 April – Norma Merrick Sklarek, African American architect (died 2012)
- 22 April – James Stirling, British architect (died 1992)
- 18 July – Carlo Aymonino, Italian architect and urban planner (died 2010)
- 12 October – César Pelli, Argentine-born architect (died 2019)
- 6 December - Rifat Chadirji, Iraqi architect (died 2020)

== Deaths ==
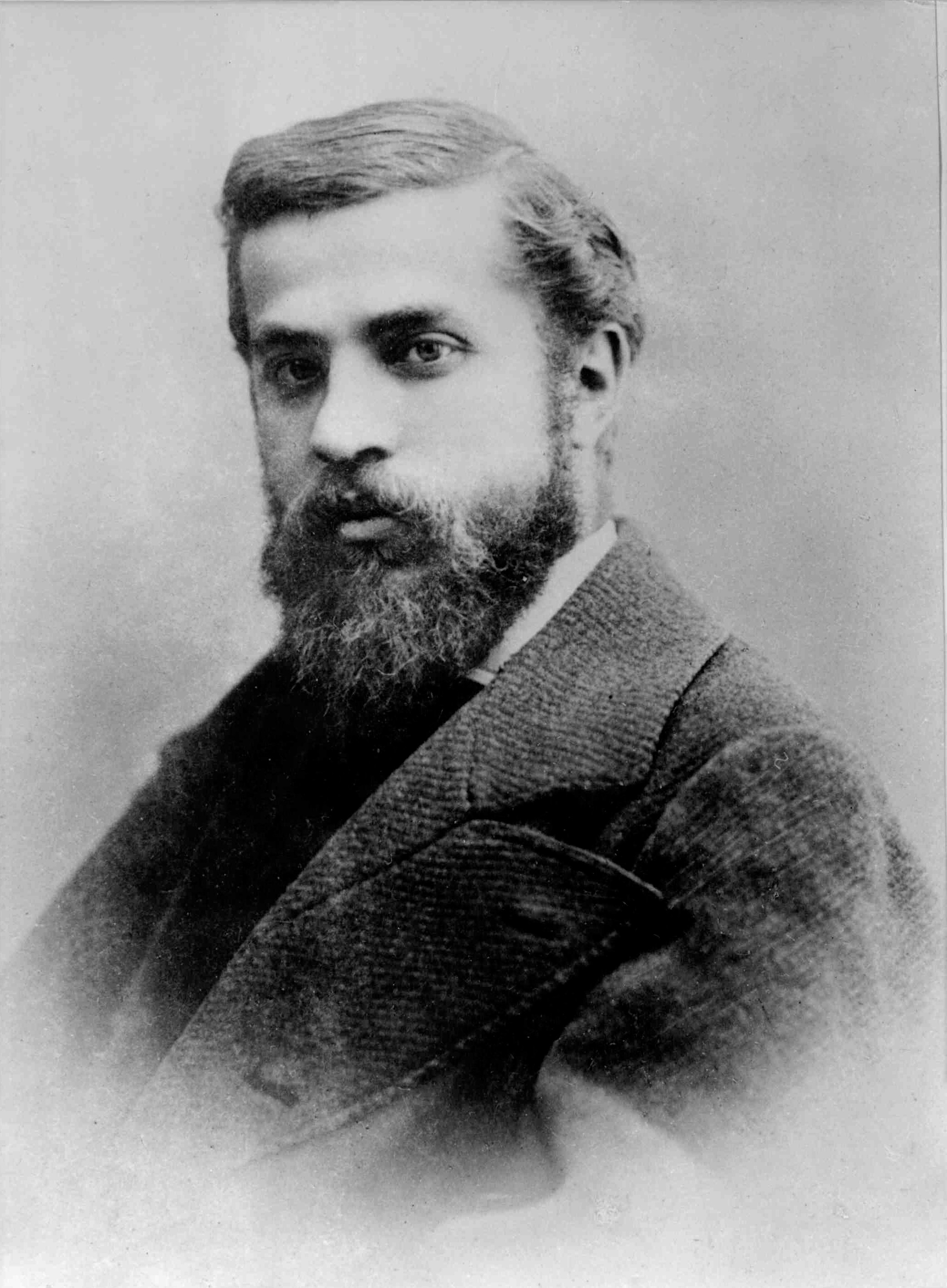
Antoni Gaudí

- 10 June – Antoni Gaudí, Spanish architect, exponent of Catalan Modernism (born 1852)
- 7 July – Fyodor Schechtel, Russian architect, graphic artist and stage designer (born 1859)
