= South Wimbledon tube station =

London Underground station

South Wimbledon
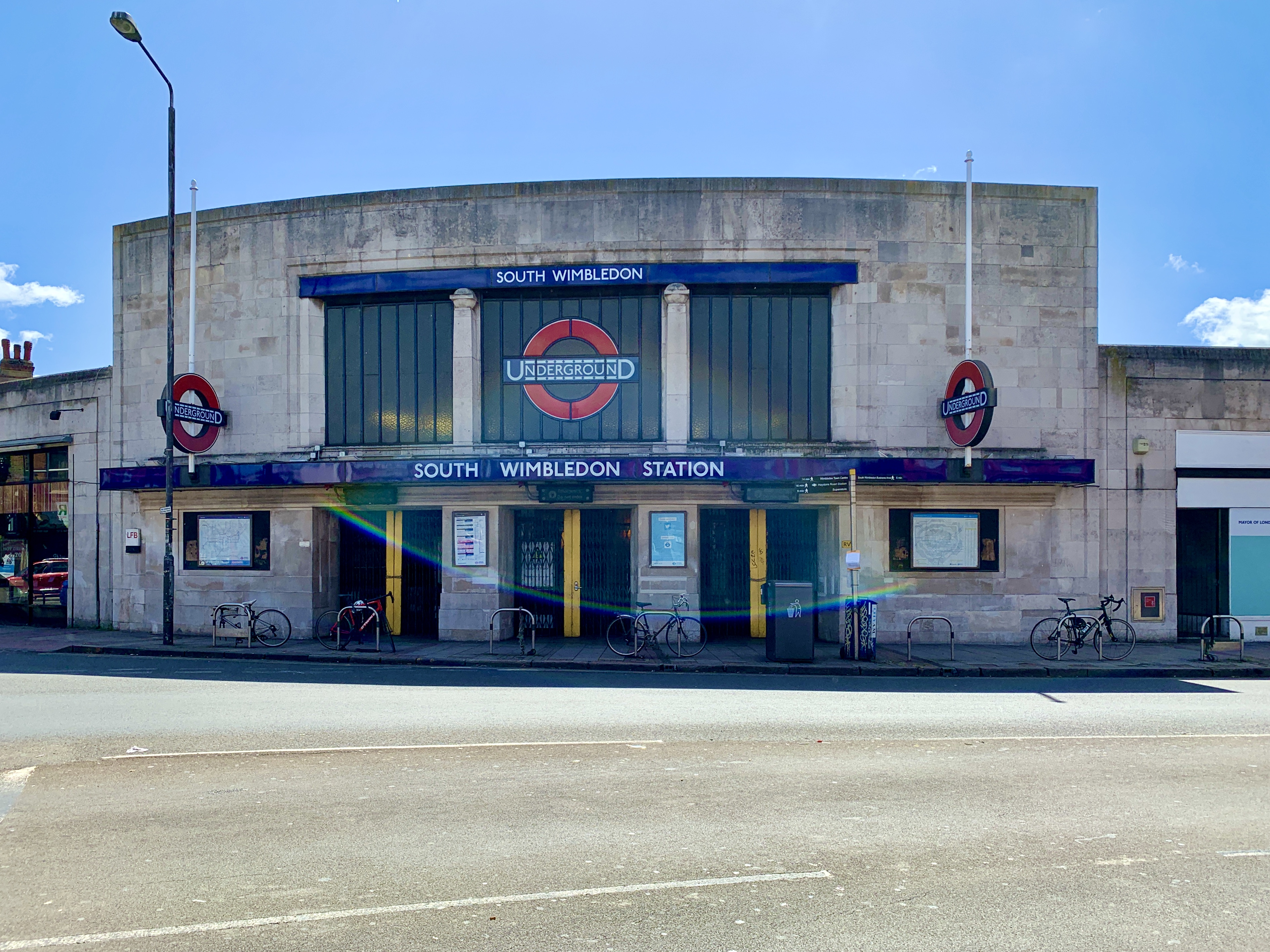
- The station entrance
- Interactive map of South Wimbledon

General information
- Location: South Wimbledon
- Local authority: London Borough of Merton
- Managed by: London Underground
- Owner: Transport for London
- Number of platforms: 2
- Fare zone: 3 and 4

London Underground annual entry and exit
- 2020: ▼1.99 million
- 2021: ▼1.94 million
- 2022: ▲3.30 million
- 2023: ▲3.61 million
- 2024: ▲3.80 million

Railway companies
- Original company: City and South London Railway

Key dates
- 13 September 1926: Opened

Listed status
- Listing grade: II
- Entry number: 1358037
- Added to list: 25 June 1987; 38 years ago

Other information
- External links: TfL station info page
- Coordinates: 51.4154°N 0.1919°W

South Wimbledon is a London Underground station in South Wimbledon, a suburb of Wimbledon in south-west London. It is on the Morden branch of the Northern line, between Colliers Wood and Morden stations. The station is located at the corner of Merton High Street (A238) and Morden Road (A219). It is on the boundary between London fare zone 3 and 4.

== History ==
The station was opened on 13 September 1926 as part of the Morden extension of the City & South London Railway south from Clapham Common. On the original plan it had the name "Merton Grove". For geographical accuracy, the station was shown as "South Wimbledon (Merton)" on tube maps from 1928, the name was also modified on platform signage, though not on the station building at street level. From the early-1950s, the "(Merton)" parenthetical fell out of use. (Note: "(Merton)" appears on the 1949 tube map, but not on the 1951 map.)

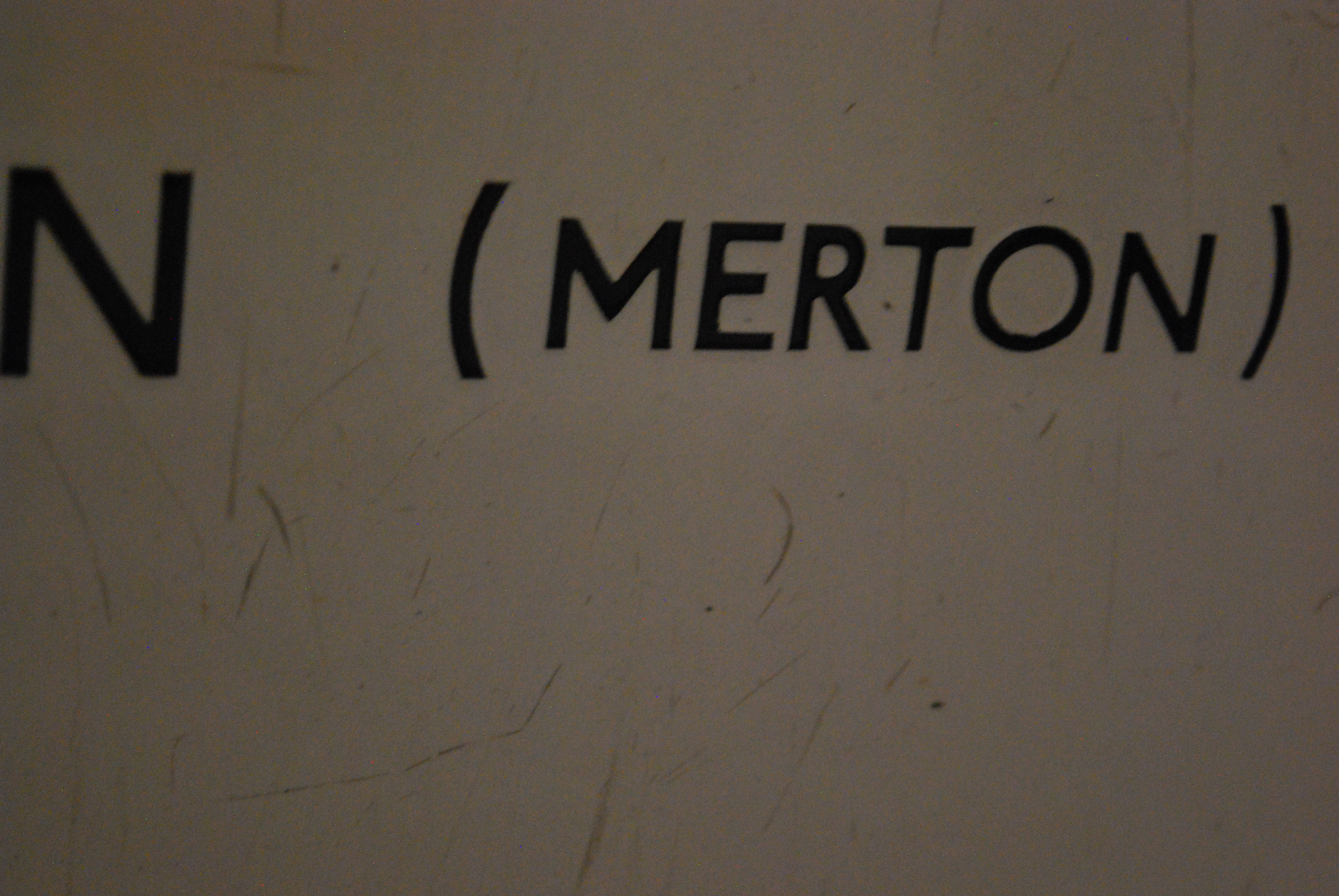
The name of the station used to be South Wimbledon (Merton) until around 1950.

Along with the other stations on the Morden extension, the building was designed by architect Charles Holden. They were Holden's first major project for the Underground. He was selected by Frank Pick, general manager of the Underground Electric Railways Company of London (UERL), to design the stations after he was dissatisfied with designs produced by the UERL's own architect, Stanley Heaps. Built with a shop to each side, the modernist design takes the form of a double-height box clad in white Portland stone with a three-part glazed screen on the front façade divided by columns of which the capitals are three-dimensional versions of the Underground roundel. The central panel of the screen contains a large version of the roundel. The station is a Grade II listed building. (Note: Holden's other stations on the Morden extension at Clapham South, Balham, Tooting Bec, Tooting Broadway and Colliers Wood are also listed Grade II.)

The station is the southernmost station on the London Underground network which has platforms in tunnels (Morden is in an open cut).

== Connections ==
The station is served by a number of day and nighttime London Buses routes. The Tramlink at Morden Road tram stop is within walking distance of the station.

== Future ==
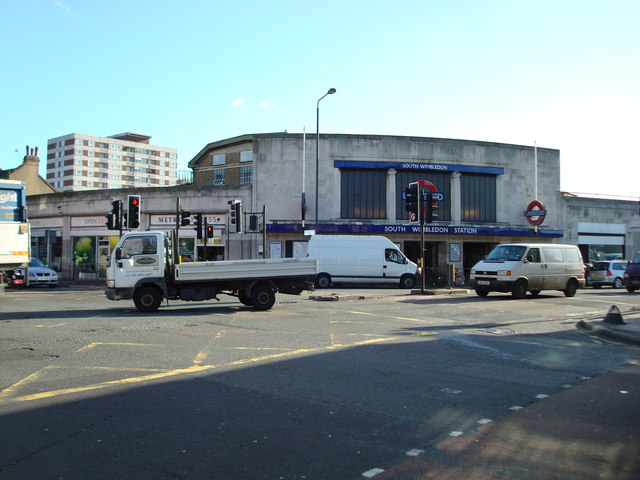
The new tram or BRT platforms would be located on Morden Road somewhere near the current station.

A planned new line to the Tramlink light rail or a separate bus rapid transit (BRT) system called the Sutton Link will create a new tram or BRT/tube interchange with new platforms built at South Wimbledon somewhere close to the current station as part of Option 1, offering services to Sutton via St Helier.

== Notes and references ==
=== References ===
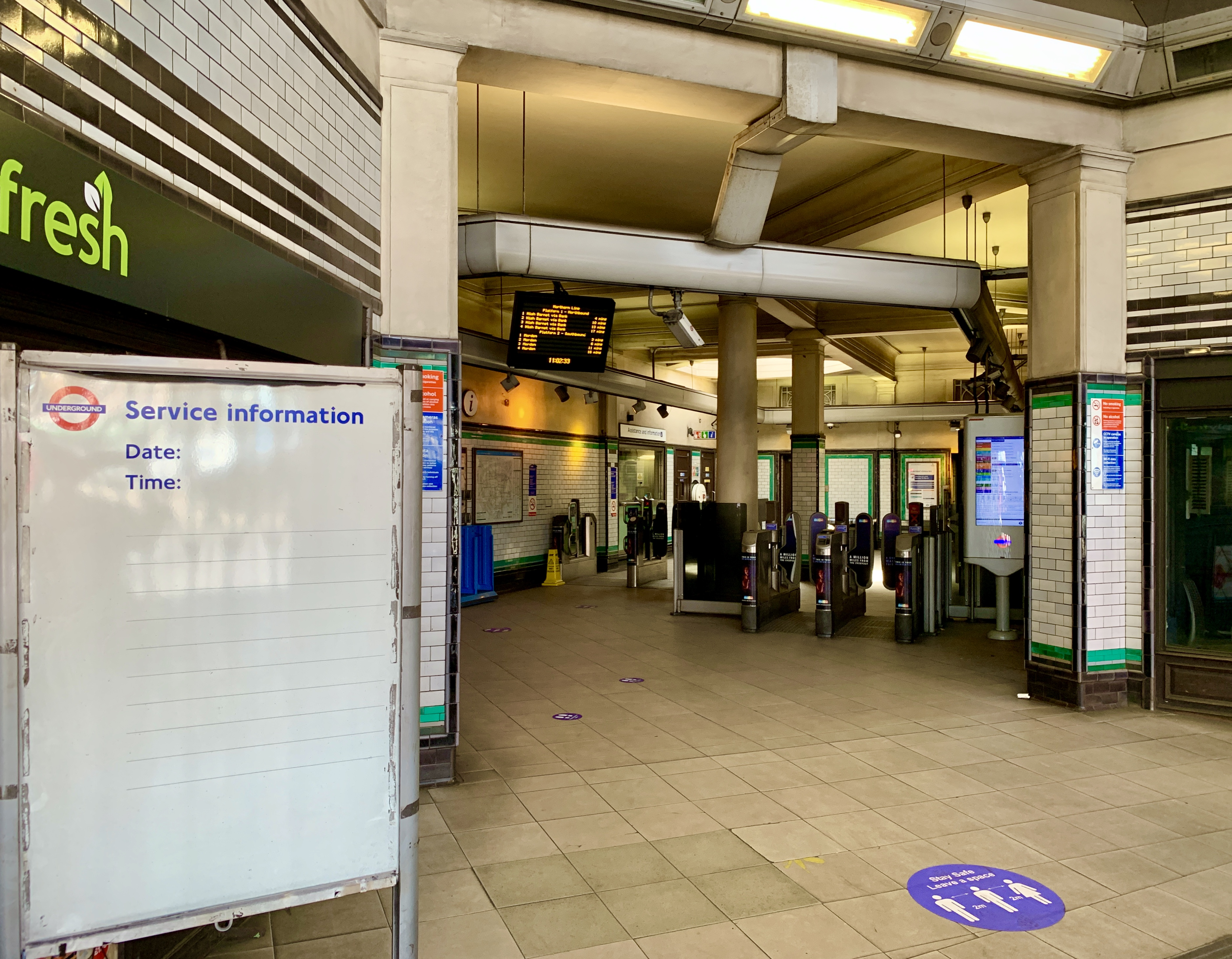
Station Entrance Area

Preceding station	London Underground	Following station
Colliers Wood towards Edgware, Mill Hill East or High Barnet	Northern line Morden branch	Morden Terminus
