= Colliers Wood tube station =

London Underground station

Colliers Wood
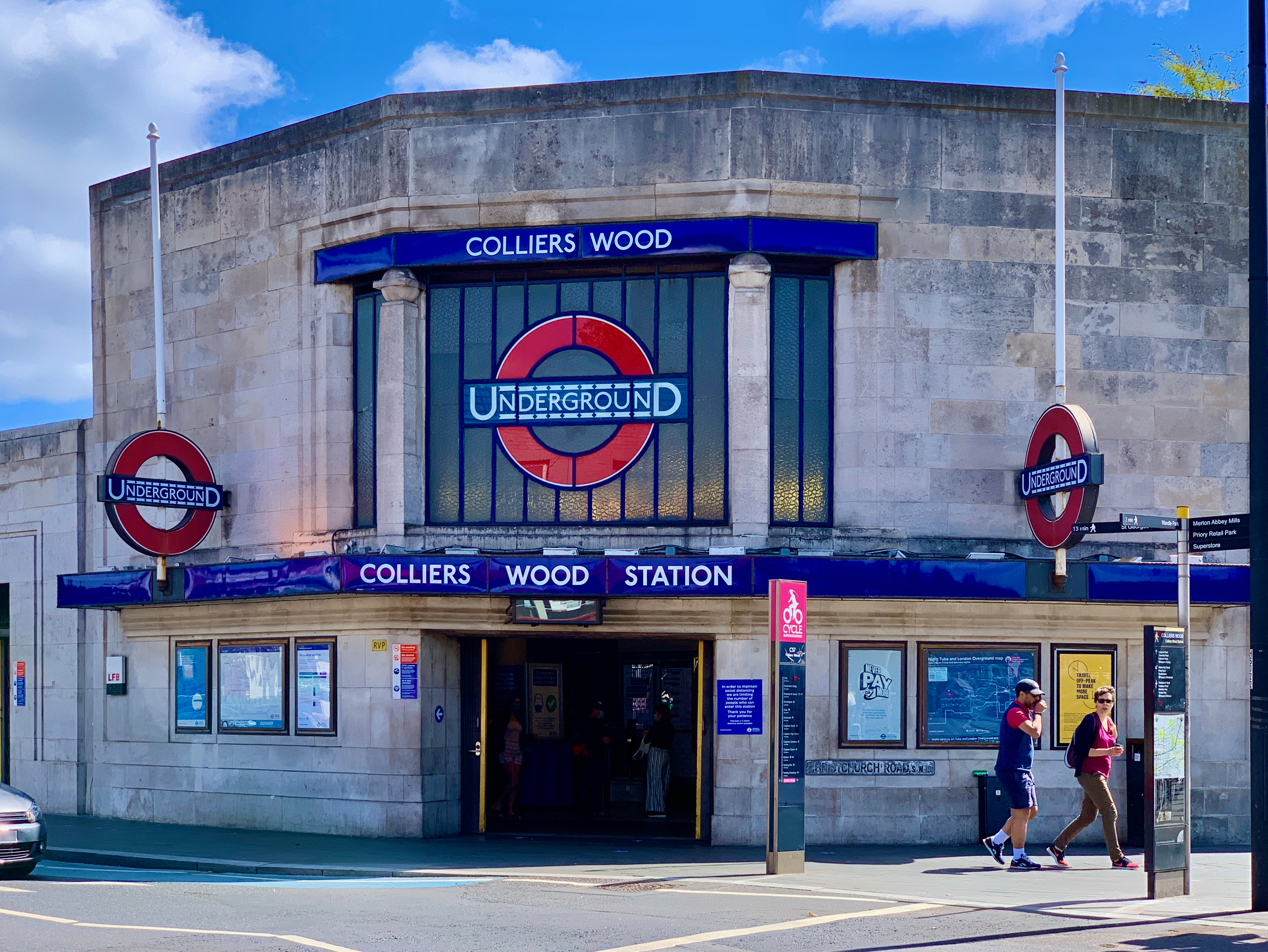
- The station entrance
- Interactive map of Colliers Wood

General information
- Location: Colliers Wood
- Local authority: London Borough of Merton
- Managed by: London Underground
- Owner: London Underground
- Number of platforms: 2
- Fare zone: 3

London Underground annual entry and exit
- 2020: ▼3.67 million
- 2021: ▼3.02 million
- 2022: ▲4.99 million
- 2023: ▲5.34 million
- 2024: ▲5.54 million

Railway companies
- Original company: City and South London Railway

Key dates
- 13 September 1926: Opened

Listed status
- Listing grade: II
- Entry number: 1080925
- Added to list: 25 June 1987; 38 years ago

Other information
- External links: TfL station info page
- Coordinates: 51.4183°N 0.178°W

Colliers Wood is a London Underground station in Colliers Wood, south-west London. It is on the Morden branch of the Northern line, between Tooting Broadway and South Wimbledon stations. The station is located at the corner of Colliers Wood High Street (A24) and Christchurch Road. It is in London fare zone 3.

== History ==
The station was opened on 13 September 1926 as part of the Morden extension of the City & South London Railway south from Clapham Common.

Along with the other stations on the Morden extension, the building was designed by architect Charles Holden. They were Holden's first major project for the Underground. He was selected by Frank Pick, general manager of the Underground Electric Railways Company of London (UERL), to design the stations after he was dissatisfied with designs produced by the UERL's own architect, Stanley Heaps. Built with a shop to each side, the modernist design takes the form of a double-height three-sided box clad in white Portland stone with a three-part glazed screen on the front façade divided by columns of which the capitals are three-dimensional versions of the Underground roundel. The central panel of the screen contains a large version of the roundel. The station is a Grade II listed building. (Note: Holden's other stations on the Morden extension at Clapham South, Balham, Tooting Bec, Tooting Broadway and South Wimbledon are also listed Grade II.)

The station is close to Merton Bus garage which opened in 1913. The public house across the road is named "The Charles Holden" in honour of the station's architect.

== Connections ==
London Buses routes 57, 131, 152, 200, 219, 470 and night route N155 serve the station.

== Notes ==
Preceding station	London Underground	Following station
Tooting Broadway towards Edgware, Mill Hill East or High Barnet	Northern line Morden branch	South Wimbledon towards Morden
