= Mitchelhill =

Mitchelhill is a surname. Notable people with the surname include:

- Barbara Mitchelhill (fl. early 21st century), English writer
- Gwendoline Mitchelhill (died 1989), victim of serial killer John Wayne Glover

== See also ==
- Mitchell (surname)
