= Tooting Market =

British Market

Coordinates: 51.4288°N 0.1660°W

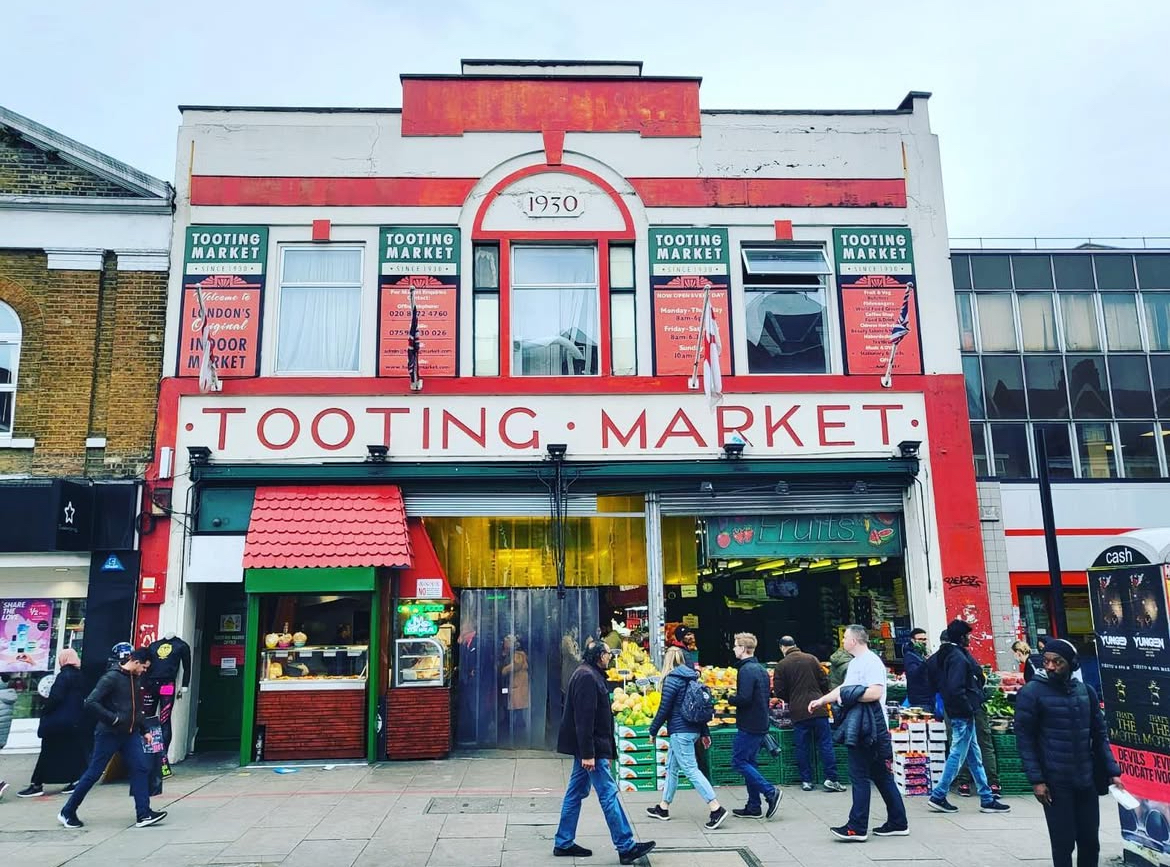
Tooting Market in 2022

Tooting Market is an indoor market which is located on the High Street in Tooting in the borough of Wandsworth in South London. It is a multicultural market which contains food vendors, retail shops, tailors and fabric sellers, and hair and beauty salons. It has existed since the early 20th century and is situated nearby Tooting Broadway Underground.

The market has blue plaques above both its entrances, which were placed in October 2022. These plaques recognise the multiculturalism of the borough and state.: "A community of all, for all. We are Tooting."

== History ==
=== 1916–1930 ===
Tooting Market in its current site was founded in October 1930. The British Newspaper Archive (BNA) contains reports from local newspapers of the opening: a half page spread in the Streatham News on 24 October 1930 announced the "NEW TOOTING MARKET". The Market however predates 1930 to an earlier site in Mitcham Road, Tooting.

Tooting borough in the early twentieth century extended at a notable rate. This was largely due to the construction of the Totterdown Fields Estate, with over 1,200 homes built between 1901 and 1911, and the arrival of a tramline from Central London. The extension of the London Underground to Tooting Broadway, completed in 1926 further benefitted the area and made it an attractive area for retail. AJ Hurley in his 1947 book Days that are Gone, noted that, "Immediately as the news spread that the Tube was coming to Balham and Tooting property at once began to increase in value, and enterprising businesses quickly bought up available sites for future development. Many of the smaller shop holders sold out at a good profit and, especially in the vicinity of Tooting Broadway and Mitcham Road, the seal of prosperity was set on the trading enterprise."

=== The covered Tooting Market and Fire of 1930 ===
Plans for a covered marketplace are recorded in an application dated 21 January 1916 to the architects' department of the London County Council (LCC) On 14 July 1916 the Streatham News reported that "the newly constructed Tooting Market is now completed." On Christmas Eve 1929 the stallholders of Tooting Market were served with notice to quit because the site had been bought by Messrs Woolworth's Ltd. intending to build a store at Tooting. This was halted by intervention from the local M.P. Sir Alfred Butt."

On 30 January 1930 Tooting market was engulfed by fire – an incident without fatalities. It was reported that the stallholders suffered significant losses, with some having failed to renew their insurance policies due to the expected closure of the market.

=== The new Tooting Market 1930 (today's site) and Second Fire July 1933 ===
James Evans Powell, a manufacturing chemist, purchased the site now occupied by Tooting Market in 1925. Land Registry records show that he acquired the freehold of 23 High Street, Tooting, and six adjacent cottages in Angel Court. Shortly afterwards an application was made to the London County Council (LCC) by architect John James Joass for "the covering over of Angel Court next High Street.' By 1930, the buildings at 21–23 High Street and Angel Court had been demolished, forming the market entrance. The redevelopment was carried out by architects Messrs Belcher and Joass of Saint James's Place, and builders Messrs White and Johnson of College Place, Chelsea. The new market opened on 23October 1930, with the event comprehensively reported in the local newspapers, and was described in early 1931 as a "boon to the housewife."

Tooting Market was struck by another fire in July 1933, a significant blaze with damage estimated at £20,000 However despite the scale of the fire it reopened a few months later in October 1933.

By 1934, Tooting Market comprised 31 stalls, several of which were operated by Jewish families. This reflected a wider pattern in early 20th-century Britain, as Jewish families moved from central London and established retail businesses in the suburbs. Among these were bespoke tailoring firms run by the Cedar, Shavick, and Krett families. The Emanuels were an established Jewish family of fruiterers and greengrocers who ran a stall at the High Street entrance for over 50 years.

=== Retailers during the 1940s ===
The 1940 Post Office Directory for Tooting Market recorded stallholders remaining since 1934: the Emanuels, Jack Cohen (Bargain Centres), James Powell (two stalls), Eggee Ltd and Fred Romaine the fishmonger.

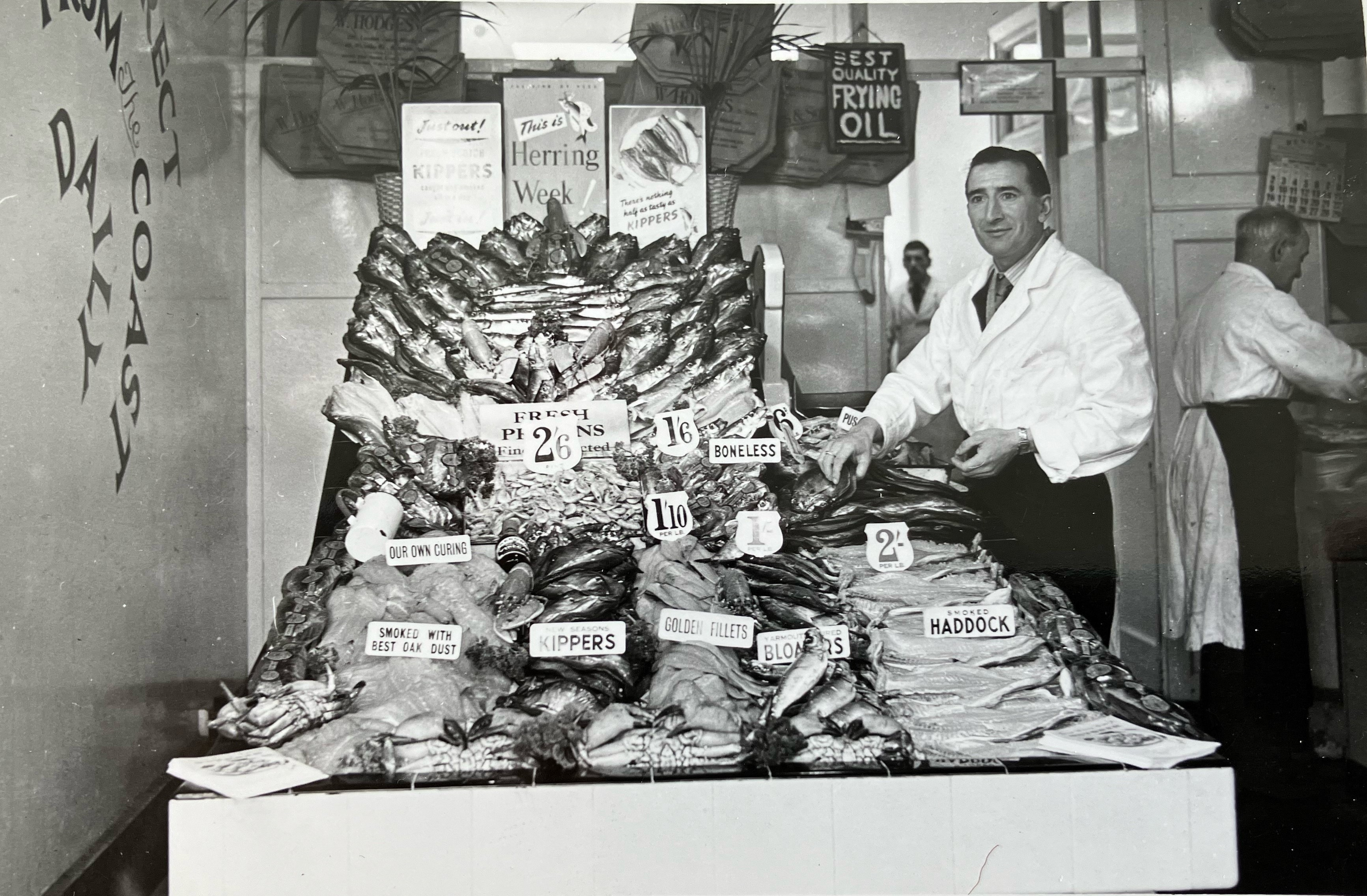
Fred Romaine fishmonger at his stall in Tooting Market during the 1950s. Photo courtesy of Pamela Goodyer.

The 1940s would have been a challenging time for the Tooting Market stallholders, in a period of food shortage, rationing and queues during the Second World War. Food rationing, introduced by the British government in 1940 was designed to ensure equitable distribution of food, and required consumers to use ration books and coupons to purchase items such as sugar, meat, fats, bacon, cheese, and eggs. Shoppers had to register with particular retailers, so many in Tooting would have turned to their regular stallholders in the market.

=== 1950s onwards ===
Rationing in the United Kingdom ended in 1954, resulting in increased consumer choice and wider product availability. The post-rationing period saw significant changes in the retail sector as businesses competed for household custom, particularly with the rise of self-service, cut-price grocers. Anthony Jackson’s Food Fare stall, which opened in Tooting Market in 1956 was an example of this.

On 15 July 1957, James Evans Powell, the proprietor of Tooting Market, died at his farm in Bletchingley at the age of 77. Under the terms of his will, ownership of the market passed to his housekeeper, Daisy Lilian Boddington. Powell’s bequest, valued at £80,000, received coverage in the press.. Daisy Boddington’s younger son, George Walter Frederick Boddington (born 1927), subsequently assumed management of the market.

=== 1960s ===
In 1960 the market's opening hours were extended to cater for late-night shoppers, with the shops to remain open until 7.30pm on Fridays. The 1960 Post Office Directory records long-standing names in the market such as Emanuel, Pater, Romaine and Brafman. There were also newcomers such as Express Key Cutting who offered a 'while you wait service'. Another new trader to the Market was Max Fox, a tailor by trade, who appears in the 1960 trade directory as a dyer and cleaner.

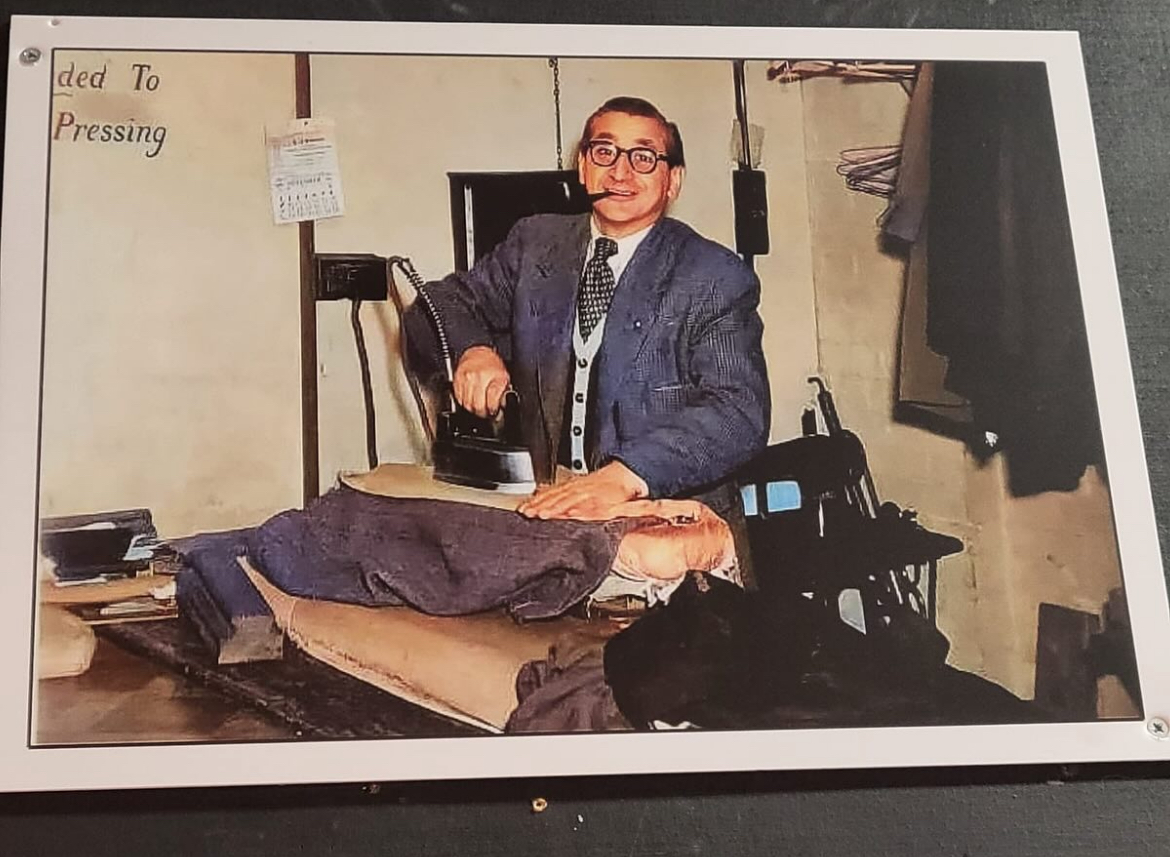
Max Fox in his tailor's shop at Tooting Market during the 1960s. Photo courtesy of Andrew Fox.

Self-service and convenience offerings were becoming more popular in the 1960s. By 1960 Anthony Jackson's Food Fare had a competitor with the arrival of Victor Value, a rapidly expanding self-service supermarket chain also offering discounted prices.

Daisy Boddington died on 7 September 1977 aged 86. and the ownership of Tooting Market passed to her grandson Peter Boddington in August 1978.

=== 1980s onwards ===
Entries in the 1980 Post Office Directory indicate changing consumer preferences, with new stalls selling jewellery, gifts, greeting cards, and a sandwich-grill bar. However several long-established traders remained, including Emanuel G Ltd. Greengrocers, Pater Textiles Ltd., Brafman Jack Ltd. Ladies Outfitters, Eggee Ltd and Express Key Cutting, O'Grady's Pet Stores and Garfield's Shoes. Stannards Butchers was also listed and continues to operate as the market’s longest-serving trader today.

In 1980, Market owner Peter Boddington’s operated a tobacconist’s stall at No. 1 Tooting Market. In 1997, he attracted national attention following a two-year legal challenge against a railway operator over the enforcement of a smoking ban on trains. The case, which reportedly cost him tens of thousands of pounds, concluded when the House of Lords dismissed his appeal. BBC News reported on the long-running case after the Lords dismissed his appeal, which was reported to have cost him tens of thousands of pounds. Reporting on the outcome BBC News stated that Mr Boddington "now travels home on trains operated by Virgin where he is allowed to puff away".

=== Change of Ownership 2010 ===
Records show Peter Boddington as a director and his mother Eileen as a secretary of The Tooting Development Company, operating from Stall 1 of Tooting Market from 1995. Eileen Boddington died in 2002, and son Peter in 2004 at the age of 50. He was outlived by his father George who died in 2009 aged 82. The market then passed to Patricia Boddington, George's second wife. In 2010 Tooting Market was sold to its current owners.

== Tooting Market today ==
Tooting Market today is home to a range of traders including retail shops, hair salons and food and drink vendors that reflect the multiculturalism of the borough – offering cuisines including Mauritian, Guyanese, Japanese, Jamaican, Italian, Lebanese and Portuguese. It has also hosted a number of music, cultural and community events and has now extended beyond the indoor market to include a street market in summer, as reported in The Evening Standard and Timeout.

== Notable traders ==
Tooting Market records from the early 1930s show grocers Cohen and Freeman trading as Bargain Centres (London) Ltd. Jack Cohen went on to establish the supermarket chain Tesco's. In the book Nothing like a Dame (2007), Dame Shirley Porter said that her birth in November 1930 coincided with her father Jack's preparations for his Bargain Centre stall in Tooting Market.

Another notable trader was Charlie Watkins. In 1949, Watkins and his brother established a record stall in the market and launched a mail-order sheet music service known as Melody Corner. Identifying a demand for improved sound amplification, Watkins later founded WEM (Watkins Electric Music), a company that became well known for its production of PA systems and loudspeaker stacks. WEM equipment played a significant role in the development of the 1960s music scene and had a lasting influence on tlarge-scale music festivals

A key subject for local London photographers was trader Gloria Reid, who opened a stall selling Caribbean food in the 1990s. Her portrait by local photographer Alex Lambert was shortlisted for the 2020 Portrait of Britain award.

== Location and transport ==
Tooting Market is located on Tooting High Street.

The nearest station is Tooting Broadway.

Bus Routes 131,155, 219, 264, 280, 493, G1 and N155 run nearby.
