= Tooting Broadway tube station =

London Underground station

Tooting Broadway
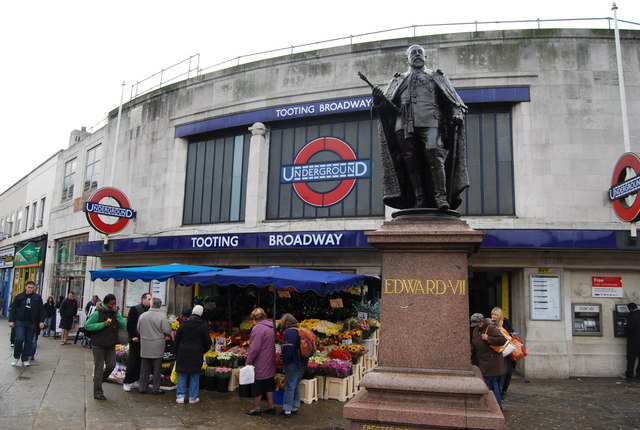
- Station entrance with a statue of Edward VII
- Interactive map of Tooting Broadway

General information
- Location: Tooting
- Local authority: London Borough of Wandsworth
- Managed by: London Underground
- Owner: London Underground
- Number of platforms: 2
- Fare zone: 3

London Underground annual entry and exit
- 2020: ▼8.10 million
- 2021: ▼6.89 million
- 2022: ▲11.62 million
- 2023: ▲12.40 million
- 2024: ▲12.71 million

Railway companies
- Original company: City and South London Railway

Key dates
- 13 September 1926: Opened (C&SLR)

Listed status
- Listing grade: II
- Entry number: 1065478
- Added to list: 16 June 1987; 39 years ago

Other information
- External links: TfL station info page
- Coordinates: 51.427778°N 0.168°W

Tooting Broadway is a London Underground station in Tooting in the London Borough of Wandsworth, south London. It is on the Morden branch of the Northern line, between Tooting Bec and Colliers Wood stations. It is in London fare zone 3. The station is located on the corner of Tooting High Street (A24) and Mitcham Road (A217).

== Location ==
The station building is a corner lot, located at the junction of two major roads, which are the A24 (Tooting High Street) and the A217 (Garratt Lane & Mitcham Road). South Thames College is just outside the station, while St. George's Hospital is a few minutes' walk away. Other attractions nearby include Tooting Market, Tooting Methodist Church and Tooting Primary School. The station is located in the centre of a busy district and serves a dense residential area. The area is also referred to as Tooting Graveney.

== History ==
In the period following the end of First World War, the Underground Electric Railways Company of London (UERL) began reviving a series of prewar plans for line extensions and improvements that had been postponed during the hostilities. Finance for the works was made possible by the government's Trade Facilities Act 1921, which, as a means of alleviating unemployment, provided for the Treasury to underwrite the value of loans raised by companies for public works.

One of the projects that had been postponed was the Wimbledon and Sutton Railway (W&SR), a plan for a new surface line from Wimbledon to Sutton over which the UERL's District Railway had control. The UERL wished to maximise its use of the government's time-limited financial backing, and, in November 1922, presented bills to parliament to construct the W&SR in conjunction with an extension of the UERL's City and South London Railway (C&SLR) south from Clapham Common through Balham, Tooting and Merton. (Note: The C&SLR extension was to be "6 miles, 1 furlong and 7.2 chains" (6.215 miles or 10.00 kilometres) long and mostly in tunnel. Originally opened in 1890, the C&SLR's original tunnels were smaller than the standard diameter used on the Underground's later deep-level lines and the C&SLR was already undergoing reconstruction to enlarge its tunnels to take larger, modern rolling stock.)

The C&SLR would connect to the W&SR route south of Morden station and run trains to Sutton and the District Railway would run trains between Wimbledon and Sutton. Under these proposals, the station on the C&SLR extension would have been named "North Morden" and the station on the W&SR route would have been called "South Morden" (the current Morden South station is in a different location).

The Southern Railway objected to this encroachment into its area of operation and the anticipated loss of its passenger traffic to the C&SLR's more direct route to central London. The UERL and SR reached an agreement in July 1923 that enabled the C&SLR to extend as far as Morden in exchange for the UERL giving up its rights over the W&SR route. (Note: The Southern Railway subsequently built the W&SR line, one of the last main line routes to be built in the London area. The first section from Wimbledon to South Merton opened on 7 July 1929, with the line being opened in full on 5 January 1930.) Construction of the C&SLR extension was rapidly carried out and Tooting Broadway station opened on 13 September 1926.

=== Former proposals ===
A post-war review of rail transport in the London area produced a report in 1946 that proposed many new lines and identified the Morden branch as being the most overcrowded section of the London Underground, needing additional capacity. To relieve the congestion, the report recommended construction of a second pair of tunnels beneath the Northern line's tunnels from Tooting Broadway to Kennington. (Note: A duplication of parts of the Northern line's tunnels had first been considered in 1935 when new tunnels were proposed between Camden Town and Waterloo and between Balham and Kennington. During the war, deep-level shelters were constructed beneath a number of Northern line stations so that they could be converted for use as part of the duplicate tunnels after the war.) Trains using the existing tunnels would start and end at Tooting Broadway with the service in the new tunnels joining the existing tunnels to Morden. Designated as route 10, the proposal was not developed by the London Passenger Transport Board or its successor organisations. (Note: Of the twelve proposed routes, only Route 8, "A South to North Link – East Croydon to Finsbury Park" was developed, eventually becoming the Victoria line.)

In 2013, it was announced that Transport for London's plans for Crossrail 2 included consideration of a station at Tooting Broadway. In October 2015, the plan was changed in favour of a route via Balham due to difficult soil conditions at the proposed site.

=== Incidents ===
On 6 October 1960, a train crashed into the end wall at the reversing siding. The driver was seriously injured.

On 4 May 1971, in a similar incident to the Moorgate disaster, another train had smashed into the end wall at the reversing siding at around 30 mph. Unlike the incident in 1960, this incident ended up killing the driver.

== Design ==
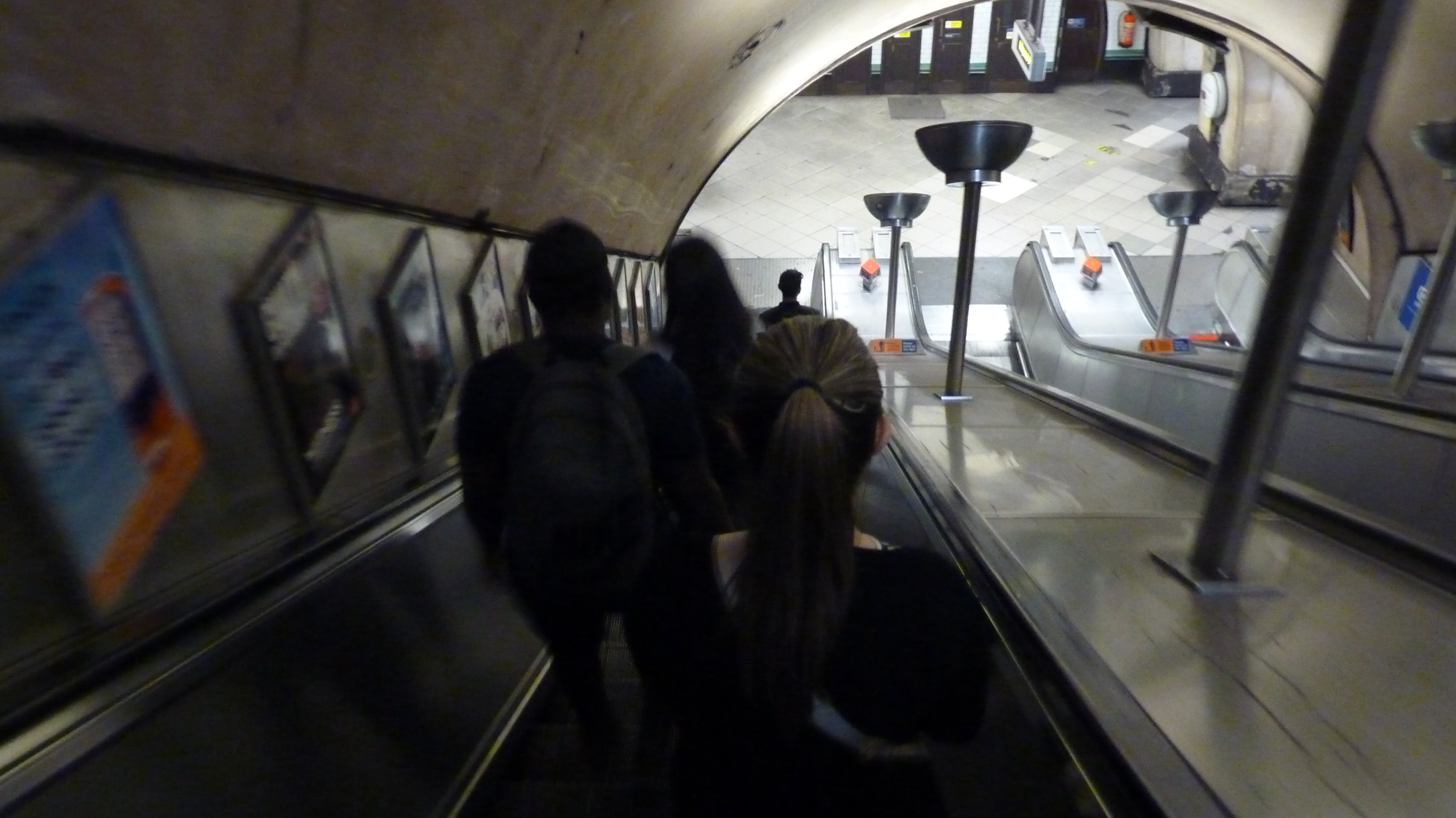

The station is a Grade II listed building. (Note: Holden's other stations on the Morden extension at Clapham South, Balham, Tooting Bec, Colliers Wood and South Wimbledon are also listed as Grade II.) Along with the other stations on the Morden extension, the building was designed by architect Charles Holden. They were Holden's first major project for the Underground. He was selected by Frank Pick, general manager of the Underground Electric Railways Company of London (UERL), to design the stations after he was dissatisfied with designs produced by the UERL's own architect, Stanley Heaps. Built with shops to each side, the modernist design takes the form of a double-height curving screen clad in white Portland stone with a three-part glazed screen in the centre of the façade divided by columns of which the capitals are three-dimensional versions of the Underground roundel. The central panel of the screen contains a large version of the roundel. The station only has access to the platforms via escalators.

== Services ==
Tooting Broadway station is on the Morden branch of the Northern line in London fare zone 3. It is between Tooting Bec to the north and Colliers Wood to the south. Train frequencies vary throughout the day, but generally operate every 2–4 minutes between 06:17 and 00:01 in both directions. The typical off-peak service, in trains per hour (tph) is:

- 10 tph northbound to Edgware via Bank
- 8 tph northbound to High Barnet via Bank
- 2 tph northbound to Mill Hill East via Bank
- 20 tph southbound to Morden

Southbound trains can terminate at Tooting Broadway on occasion rather than continue on to the end of the line at Morden, which is three stations to the south. To return north, out of service trains run south from the southbound platform into a reversing siding between the two running tunnels before reversing and running north through points on to the northbound platform where they return into service.

| Preceding station | London Underground | Following station |
|---|---|---|
| Tooting Bec towards Edgware, Mill Hill East or High Barnet | Northern line Morden branch | Colliers Wood towards Morden |

== Connections ==
Various day and nighttime London Bus routes serve the station. Tooting, the nearest railway station, is an 18-minute walk away along the A217 Mitcham Road.

== In popular culture ==
Tooting Broadway station features in the opening credits of the BBC comedy Citizen Smith and again in the closing sequence of the very last episode.

The station is referenced in the title of the Kitchens of Distinction's song "On Tooting Broadway Station" from their third album The Death of Cool.

== Notes and references ==
=== Bibliography ===
- Barman, Christian (1979). The Man Who Built London Transport: A Biography of Frank Pick. David & Charles. ISBN 0-7153-7753-1.
- Day, John R; Reed, John (2010) [1963]. The Story of London's Underground. Capital Transport. ISBN 978-1-85414-341-9.
- Emmerson, Andrew; Beard, Tony (2004). London's Secret Tubes. Capital Transport. ISBN 1-85414-283-6.
- Harris, Cyril M. (2006) [1977]. What's in a Name?. Capital History. ISBN 1-85414-241-0.
- Inglis, Charles (21 January 1946). Report to the Minister of War Transport. Ministry of War Transport/His Majesty's Stationery Office.
- Jackson, Alan A. (December 1966). "The Wimbledon & Sutton Railway: A late arrival on the South London suburban scene" (PDF). The Railway Magazine. pp. 675–680.
- Martin, Andrew (2013) [2012]. Underground Overground. Profile Books. ISBN 978-1-84668-478-4.
- Orsini, Fiona (2010). Underground Journeys: Charles Holden's designs for London Transport (PDF). V&A + RIBA Architecture Partnership. Archived from the original (PDF) on 14 March 2012.
- Rose, Douglas (1999) [1980]. The London Underground, A Diagrammatic History. Douglas Rose/Capital Transport. ISBN 1-85414-219-4.
