= Morden tube station =

London Underground station

Morden
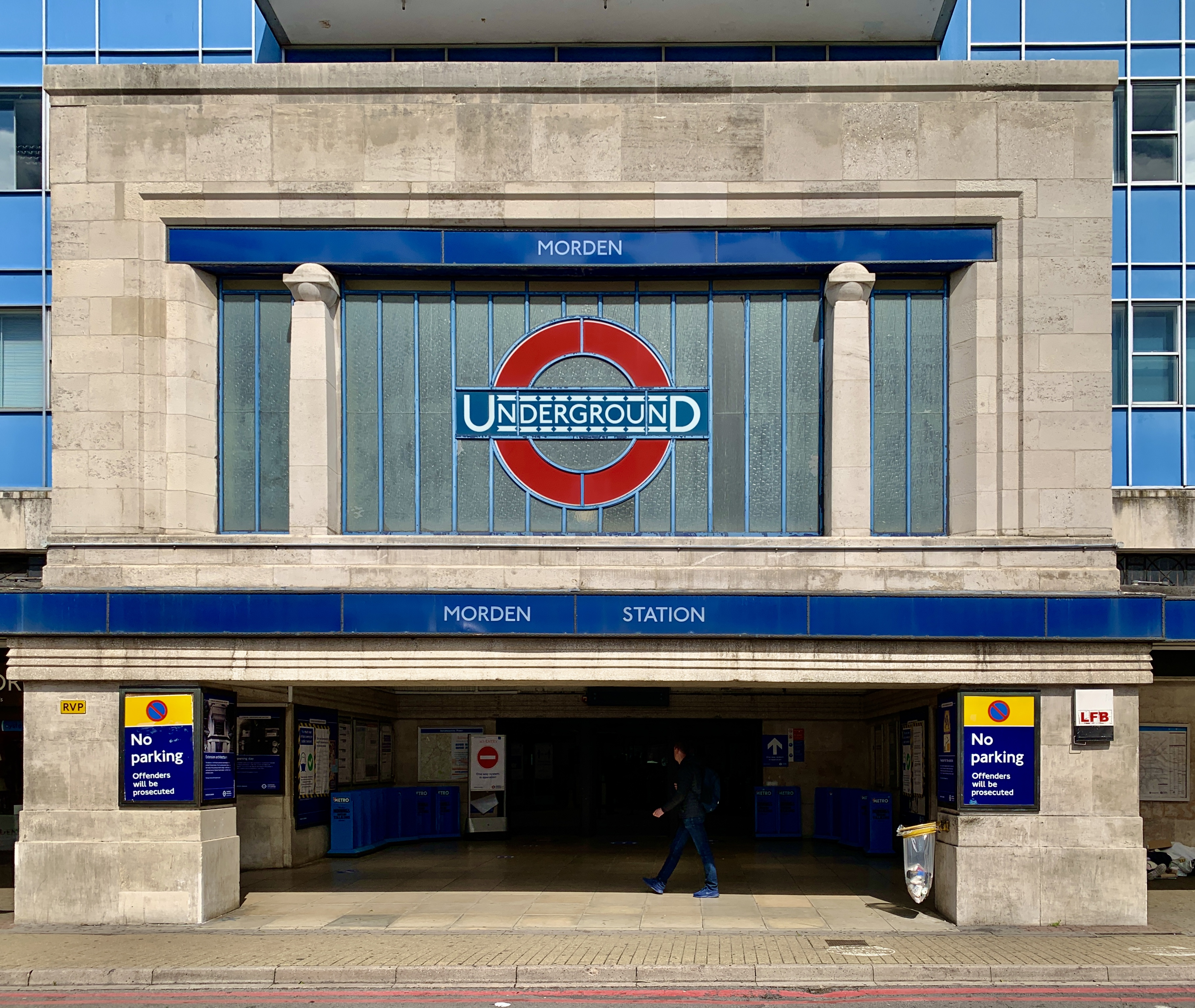
- The station entrance
- Interactive map of Morden

General information
- Location: Morden
- Local authority: Merton
- Managed by: London Underground
- Owner: London Underground
- Number of platforms: 4
- Tracks: 3
- Accessible: Yes
- Fare zone: 4

London Underground annual entry and exit
- 2021: ▼4.42 million
- 2022: ▲7.68 million
- 2023: ▲8.26 million
- 2024: ▲8.33 million
- 2025: ▼8.30 million

Railway companies
- Original company: City and South London Railway

Key dates
- 13 September 1926: Opened

Other information
- External links: TfL station info page
- Coordinates: 51.4022°N 0.1948°W

Morden is a London Underground station in Morden in the London Borough of Merton. It is the southern terminus on its branch of the Northern line, and is the most southerly station on the network. It is located on London Road (the A24), and is in London fare zone 4. Nearby are Morden Hall Park and Morden Park. The next station towards North London is South Wimbledon.

The station was one of the first modernist designs produced for the London Underground by Charles Holden. Its opening in 1926 contributed to the rapid development of new suburbs in what was previously a rural part of Surrey; the population of the parish increased ninefold in the decade 1921–1931.

== History ==
Following the end of the First World War, the Underground Electric Railways Company of London (UERL) began reviving a series of prewar plans for line extensions and improvements that had been postponed during the hostilities. Finance for the works was made possible by the government's Trade Facilities Act 1921, which, as a means of alleviating unemployment, provided for the Treasury to underwrite the value of loans raised by companies for public works.

One of the projects that had been postponed was the Wimbledon and Sutton Railway (W&SR), a plan for a new surface line from Wimbledon to Sutton over which the UERL's District Railway (DR) had control. The UERL wished to maximise its use of the government's time-limited financial backing, and, in November 1922, presented Bills to parliament to construct the W&SR in conjunction with an extension of the UERL's City and South London Railway (C&SLR) south from Clapham Common through Balham, Tooting and Merton. (Note: The C&SLR extension was to be "6 miles, 1 furlong and 7.2 chains" (6.215 miles or 10.00 kilometres) long and mostly in tunnel. Originally opened in 1890, the C&SLR's original tunnels were smaller than the standard diameter used on the Underground's later deep-level lines, and the C&SLR was already undergoing reconstruction to enlarge its tunnels to take larger, modern rolling stock.)

The C&SLR was to connect to the W&SR route south of Morden station and run trains to Sutton, and the DR was to run trains between Wimbledon and Sutton. Under these proposals the station on the C&SLR extension would have been named "North Morden", and the station on the W&SR route would have been named "South Morden" (the current Morden South station is in a different location). The proposals also included a depot at Morden for use by both DR and C&SLR trains.

The Southern Railway (SR) objected to this encroachment into its area of operation and to the anticipated loss of its passenger traffic to the C&SLR's more direct route to central London. The UERL and SR reached an agreement in July 1923 that enabled the C&SLR to extend as far as Morden in exchange for the UERL giving up its rights over the W&SR route. (Note: The Southern Railway subsequently built the W&SR line, one of the last main line routes to be built in the London area. The first section from Wimbledon to South Merton opened on 7 July 1929, with the line being opened in full on 5 January 1930.) Construction of the C&SLR extension was rapidly carried out, and Morden station was opened on 13 September 1926.

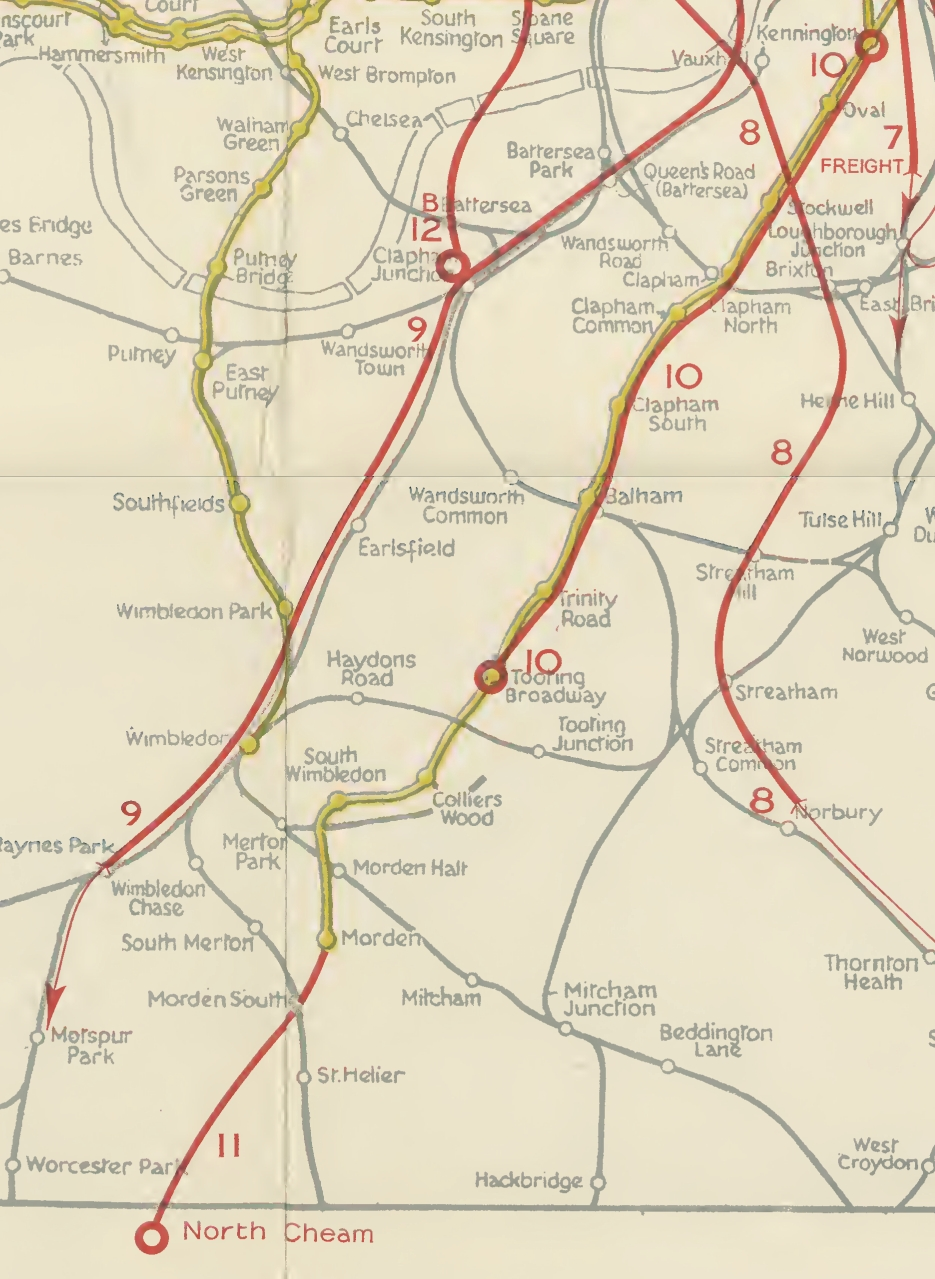
Duplication of tunnels on the Morden branch and extension to North Cheam proposed in 1946

Once the station was opened, the UERL established Morden station, the southernmost on the system, as the hub for numerous bus routes heading further into suburban south London and northern Surrey. These routes had a significant impact on the SR's main line operations in the area; the SR estimated in 1928 that it had lost approximately four million passengers per year. The UERL, though, was able to demonstrate that its passenger numbers on its buses to Sutton station were actually more than double those for Morden. Across the road from the station, the UERL opened its own petrol station (the first of its kind in the country) and garage where commuters with cars, or bicycles, could leave their vehicles during the day. (Note: The garage was located next to the railway cutting to Morden depot on part of the land now occupied by an Iceland supermarket.) The opening of the C&SLR and the Wimbledon to Sutton line led to rapid construction of suburban housing throughout the area. The population of the parish of Morden, previously the most rural of the areas through which the lines passed, increased from 1,355 in 1921 to 12,618 in 1931 and 35,417 in 1951.

A postwar review of rail transport in the London area produced a report in 1946 that proposed many new lines and identified the Morden branch as being the most overcrowded section of the London Underground, needing additional capacity. To relieve the congestion and to provide a new service south of Morden, the report recommended construction of a second pair of tunnels beneath the Northern line's tunnels from Tooting Broadway to Kennington and an extension from Morden to North Cheam. (Note: A duplication of parts of the Northern line's tunnels had first been considered in 1935 when new tunnels were proposed between Camden Town and Waterloo and between Balham and Kennington. During the war, deep-level shelters were constructed beneath a number of Northern line stations so that they could be converted for use as part of the duplicate tunnels after the war.) Trains using the existing tunnels would start and end at Tooting Broadway, with the service in the new tunnels joining the existing tunnels to Morden. The extension to North Cheam would run in tunnel. Designated as routes 10 and 11, these proposals were not developed by the London Passenger Transport Board or its successor organisations. (Note: Of the twelve proposed routes, only Route 8, "A South to North Link – East Croydon to Finsbury Park" was developed, eventually becoming the Victoria line.)

== Station building ==
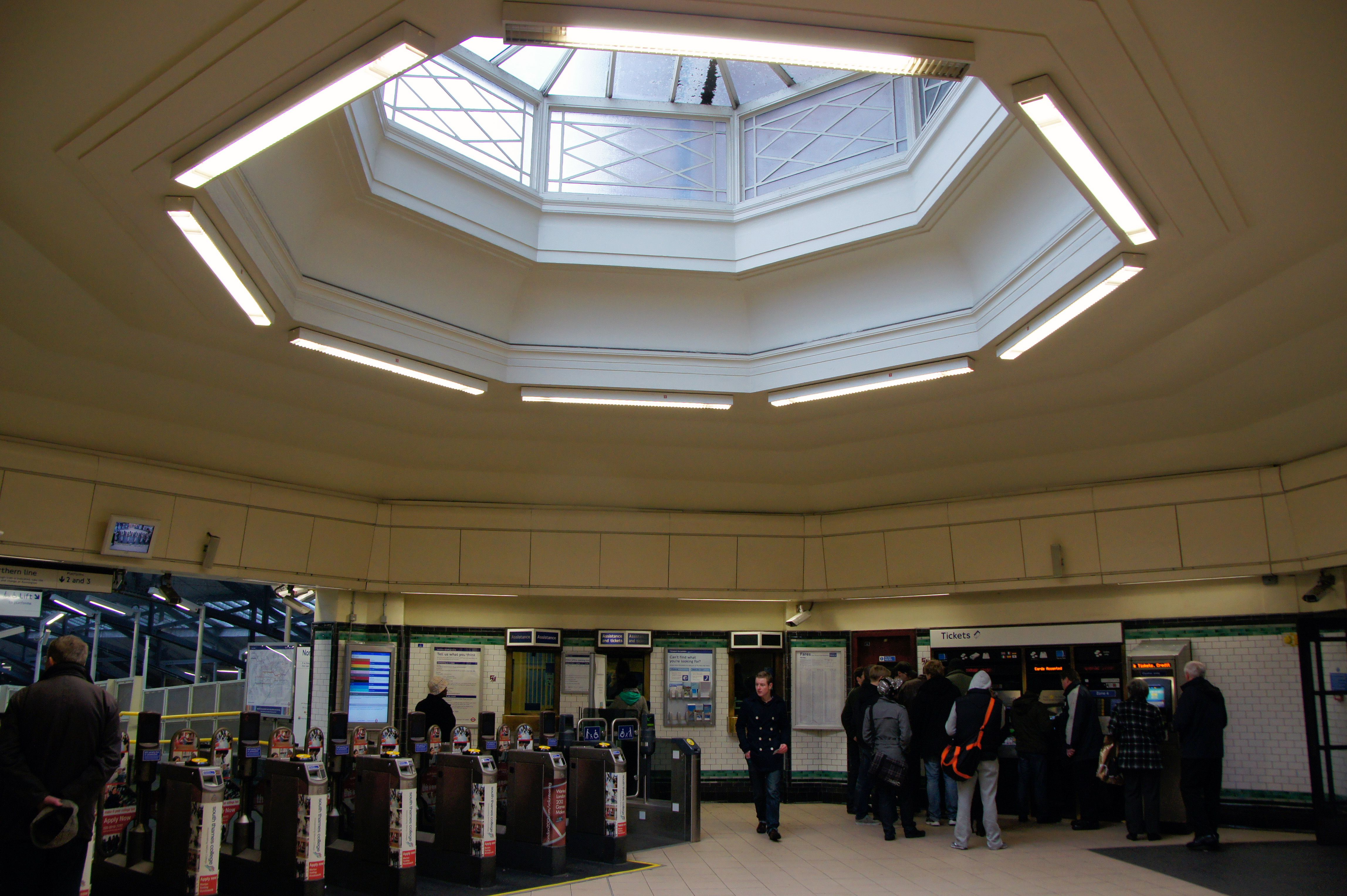
Octagonal ticket hall and roof light

Morden in 1926 was a rural area and the station was built on open farmland, giving its architect, Charles Holden, more space than had been available for the majority of the stations on the new extension which were located in already built-up areas. The stations on the Morden extension were Holden's first major project for the Underground. He was selected by Frank Pick, general manager of the UERL, to design the stations after he was dissatisfied with designs produced by the UERL's own architect, Stanley Heaps.

In a letter to his friend Harry Peach, a fellow member of the Design and Industries Association (DIA), Pick explained his choice of Holden: "I may say that we are going to build our stations upon the Morden extension railway to the most modern pattern. We are going to discard entirely all ornament. We are going to build in reinforced concrete. The station will be simply a hole in the wall, everything being sacrificed to the doorway and some notice above to tell you to what the doorway leads. We are going to represent the DIA gone mad, and in order that I may go mad in good company I have got Holden to see that we do it properly." (Note: As part of the design process, a full-size mock-up of the entrance to one of the stations on the extension was erected in an exhibition hall.)

Built with a range of shops to both sides, the modernist design of the entrance vestibule takes the form of a double-height box clad in white Portland stone with a three-part glazed screen on the front façade divided by columns of which the capitals are three-dimensional versions of the Underground roundel. The central panel of the screen contains a large version of the roundel. The ticket hall beyond is octagonal with a central roof light of the same shape. The ticket hall originally had a pair of wooden ticket booths (passimeters) from which tickets were issued and collected, but these were removed when modern ticketing systems made them redundant.

The main structure of the station and the shops to each side was designed with the intention of taking upward development on its roof, though this did not come until around 1960 when three storeys of office building were added.

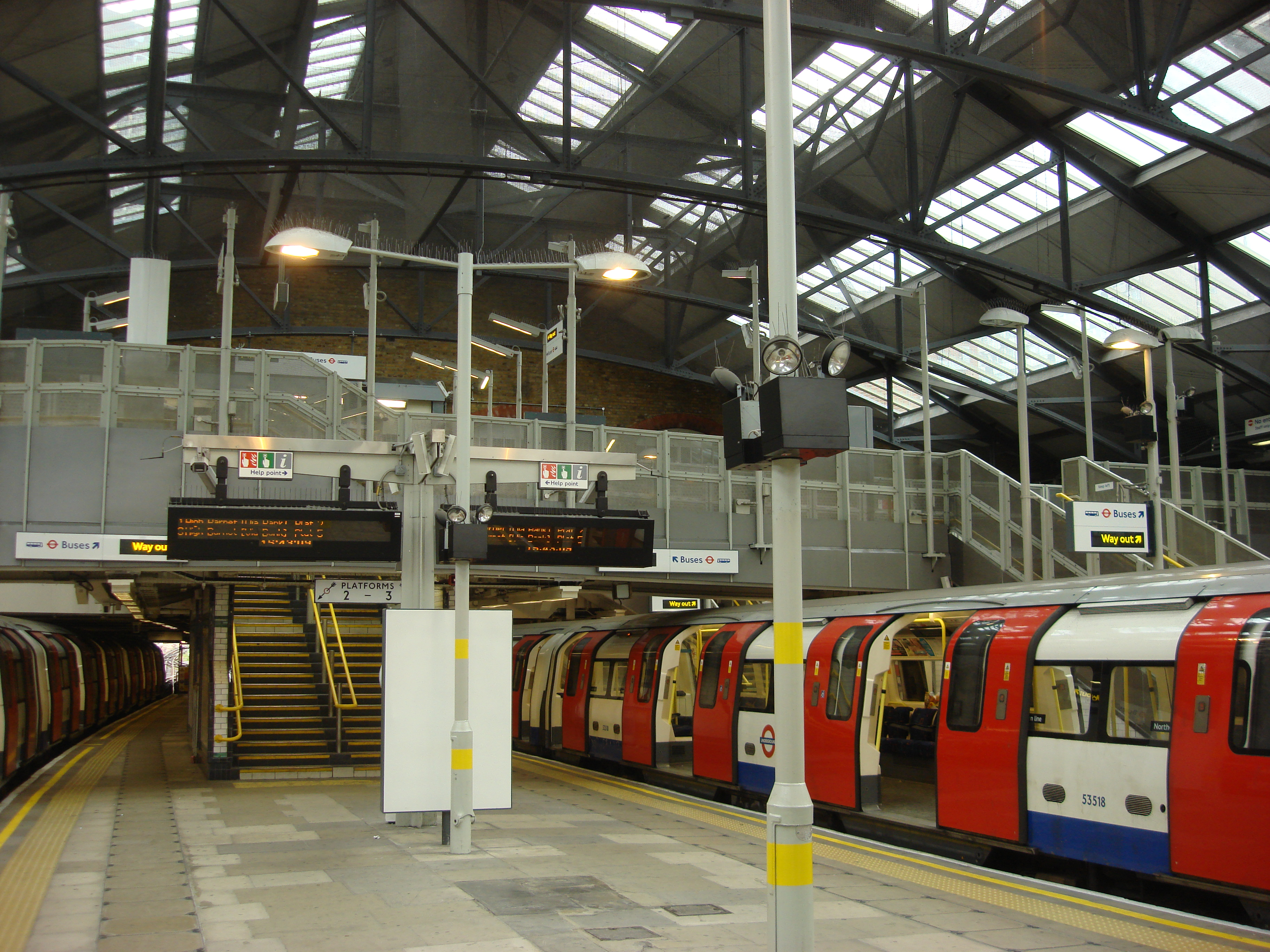
Platforms and station roof canopy looking south

Unlike the other stations built for the extension, the station's platforms are not in tunnels, but in a wide cutting with the tunnel portals a short distance to the north. (Note: The section of tunnel immediately north of the portal was constructed as a cut-and-cover tunnel. The original intention was to leave it as an open cutting, but the wet condition of the ground made it necessary to cover the tunnel. The cut-and-cover section is covered by a small linear park, Kendor Gardens, north of which the tracks separate into standard tube tunnels. A total of 82,000 cubic yards (63,000 m^{3}) of spoil excavated from the station cutting, the cut-and-cover section of tunnel and part of the tube tunnel towards South Wimbledon was removed using an aerial ropeway for disposal in a gravel pit about half-a-mile away.) Three tracks run through the station to the depot, and the station has three platforms, two of which are island platforms with tracks on each side. The platforms are accessed by steps down from the ticket hall and are numbered 1 to 5 from east to west; the island platforms have different numbers for each face (2/3 and 4/5). To indicate departures, the platforms are usually referred to as 2, 3 and 5. The tunnel portals are one end of the longest tunnel on the London Underground, running 27.8 kilometres (17.3 mi) to East Finchley via the Bank branch. (Note: When the Northern line tunnels were extended from Archway to East Finchley in 1939, the tunnel was the longest in the world.)

Refurbishment and improvement works completed in 2007 included new and reconstructed cross-bridges between platforms, and the installation of lifts for mobility-impaired passengers. Cosmetic improvements carried out at the same time included the reinstatement of pole-mounted roundels on the sides of the entrance vestibule. (Note: Pole-mounted roundels were used on all of the stations on the Morden extension, but were gradually lost during modernisations. Photographs indicate that they were removed from Morden station in the mid-1950s and replaced with large, flat roundels.) Other work in the 2000s at the station includes the construction of a substantial air rights building spanning across the cutting.

The station is locally listed by Merton Council as being of architectural interest, though not statutorily listed like the others on the Morden extension. (Note: Clapham South, Balham, Tooting Bec, Tooting Broadway, Colliers Wood and South Wimbledon stations are all Grade II listed.)

== Services ==
Morden station is the southern terminus on its branch of the Northern line in London fare zone 4. It is the southernmost station on the network. (Note: Though tube maps also show West Croydon station, which is geographically further south than Morden, that station is part of the London Overground network.) The next station is South Wimbledon to the north. Train frequencies vary throughout the day, but generally operate every 2–5 minutes between 05:15 and 00:05.

Preceding station	London Underground	Following station
South Wimbledon towards Edgware, Mill Hill East or High Barnet	Northern line Morden branch	Terminus

== Connections ==
Various day and nighttime London Buses routes serve the station.

=== Future ===
If built, a planned extension to the Tramlink light rail system would create a new tram interchange close to Morden, offering tram services to Sutton via St Helier.

== Notes and references ==
=== Bibliography ===
- Badsey-Ellis, Antony (2012). Underground Heritage. Capital Transport. ISBN 978-1-85414-360-0.
- Badsey-Ellis, Antony (2016). Building London's Underground: From Cut-and Cover to Crossrail. Capital Transport. ISBN 978-1-8541-4397-6.
- Barman, Christian (1979). The Man Who Built London Transport: A Biography of Frank Pick. David & Charles. ISBN 0-7153-7753-1.
- Day, John R; Reed, John (2010) [1963]. The Story of London's Underground. Capital Transport. ISBN 978-1-85414-341-9.
- Emmerson, Andrew; Beard, Tony (2004). London's Secret Tubes. Capital Transport. ISBN 1-85414-283-6.
- Harris, Cyril M. (2006) [1977]. What's in a Name?. Capital History. ISBN 1-85414-241-0.
- Inglis, Charles (21 January 1946). Report to the Minister of War Transport. Ministry of War Transport/His Majesty's Stationery Office.
- Jackson, Alan A. (December 1966). "The Wimbledon & Sutton Railway: A late arrival on the South London suburban scene" (PDF). The Railway Magazine. pp. 675–680.
- "Morden Station Planning Brief" (PDF). London Borough of Merton. March 2013. Archived from the original (PDF) on 2 November 2014.
- Martin, Andrew (2013) [2012]. Underground Overground. Profile Books. ISBN 978-1-84668-478-4.
- Orsini, Fiona (2010). Underground Journeys: Charles Holden's designs for London Transport (PDF). V&A + RIBA Architecture Partnership. Archived from the original (PDF) on 14 March 2012.
- Rose, Douglas (1999) [1980]. The London Underground, A Diagrammatic History. Douglas Rose/Capital Transport. ISBN 1-85414-219-4.
- Wolmar, Christian (2005) [2004]. The Subterranean Railway: How the London Underground Was Built and How It Changed the City Forever. Atlantic Books. ISBN 1-84354-023-1.
