= South Wimbledon =

Suburb of London, England

Coordinates: 51.415°N 0.196°W

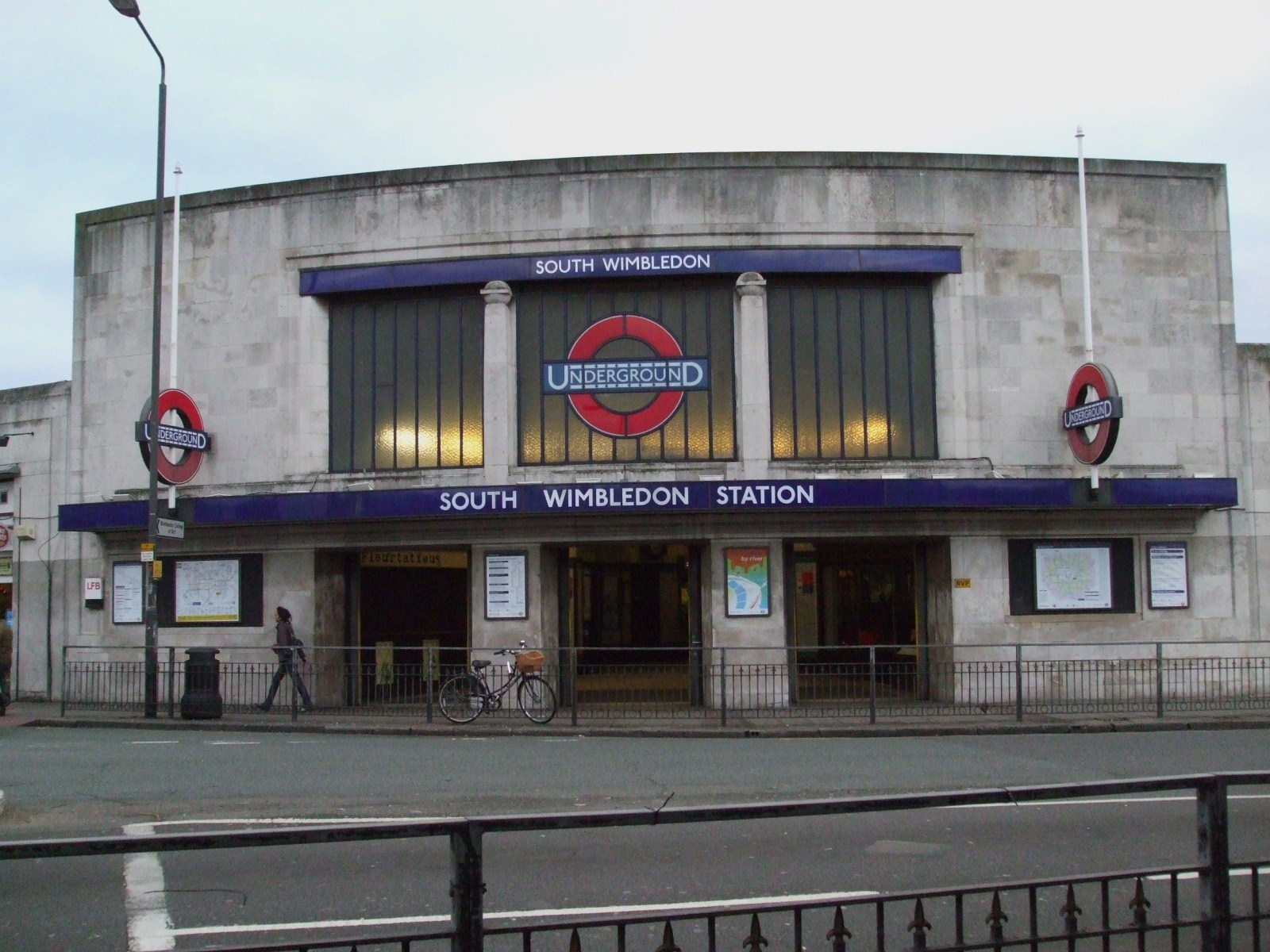
- South Wimbledon tube station

- Location within Greater London
- OS grid reference: TQ255705
- London borough: Merton
- Ceremonial county: Greater London
- Region: London
- Country: England
- Sovereign state: United Kingdom
- Post town: LONDON
- Postcode district: SW19
- Dialling code: 020
- Police: Metropolitan
- Fire: London
- Ambulance: London
- UK Parliament: Wimbledon
- London Assembly: Merton and Wandsworth

South Wimbledon is an area of Wimbledon in south-west London in the London Borough of Merton, England.

== History ==
=== Toponymy ===
It is marked on an Ordnance Survey map of 1876 as New Wimbledon and on a 1907 map as South Wimbledon. The name is derived from Wimbledon, which is located to the North.

=== Local government ===
South Wimbledon formed the northeastern section of the parish of Merton, with the separate parish of Wimbledon located to the north. The parish became the Merton Urban District in 1907, renamed Merton and Morden in 1913. South Wimbledon has formed part of the London Borough of Merton since 1965.

=== Urban development ===
South Wimbledon tube station was opened in 1926 on the corner of Merton High Street and Morden Road.

== Geography ==
Wimbledon town centre is to the north, Morden to the south, Colliers Wood is to the east and to the west are Merton Park and Wimbledon Chase.
