= Tooting =

Area in London, England

Coordinates: 51.4280°N 0.1650°W

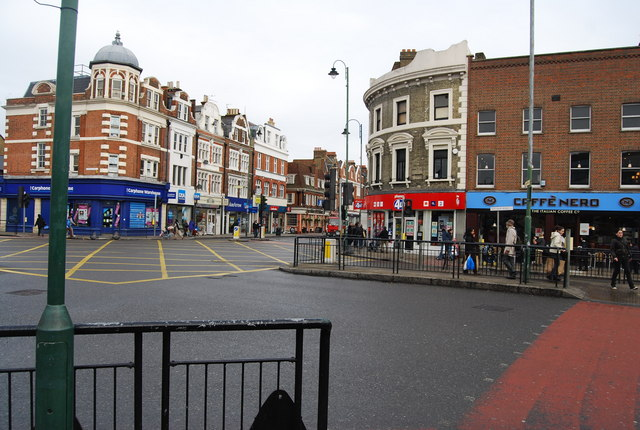
- Junction of Mitcham Road and Tooting High Street

- Location within Greater London
- Population: 16,239 (2011 Census. Ward)
- OS grid reference: TQ275715
- London borough: Wandsworth
- Ceremonial county: Greater London
- Region: London
- Country: England
- Sovereign state: United Kingdom
- Post town: London
- Postcode district: SW17
- Dialling code: 020
- Police: Metropolitan
- Fire: London
- Ambulance: London
- UK Parliament: Tooting Mitcham and Morden
- London Assembly: Merton and Wandsworth

Tooting is a district in South London, forming part of the London Borough of Wandsworth. It is located 5 miles (8 kilometres) south south-west of Charing Cross.

== History ==
A map showing the Tooting ward of Wandsworth Metropolitan Borough as it appeared in 1916

Tooting has been settled since pre-Saxon times. The name is of Anglo-Saxon origin but the meaning is disputed. It could mean the people of Tota, in which context Tota may have been a local Anglo-Saxon chieftain. Alternatively it could be derived from an old meaning of the verb to tout, to look out. There may have been a watchtower here on the road to London and hence the people of the look-out post.

The Romans built a road, which was later named Stane Street by the English, from London (Londinium) to Chichester (Noviomagus Regnorum), and which passed through Tooting. Tooting High Street is built on this road. In Saxon times, Tooting and Streatham (then Toting-cum-Stretham) was given to the Abbey of Chertsey. Later, Suene (Sweyn), believed to be a Viking, may have been given all or part of the land. In 933, King Æthelstan is thought to have confirmed lands including Totinge (Tooting) to Chertsey Abbey.

Tooting appears in the Domesday Book of 1086 as Totinges: Lower Tooting was held from Chertsey Abbey by Haimo the Sheriff (of Kent) when its assets were 1 church, 2 1/2 ploughlands of land and 5 acres (2 hectares) of meadow. Its people were called to render £4 per year to their overlords. Later in the Norman period, it came into the possession of the De Gravenel family, after whom it was named Tooting Graveney. Until minor changes in the 19th century it consisted of 2 km^{2} (3/4 sq mi). The ancient parish of Tooting Graveney included the southern part of what is now Streatham.

Upper Tooting, or Tooting Bec (for centuries administered as part of Streatham), appears as a manor held by the Abbey of Hellouin Bec, in Normandy, thus acquiring the "Bec" in its name. Its Domesday assets were 5 hides. It had 5 1/2 ploughlands and so was assessed as rendering £7.

As with many of South London's suburbs, Tooting developed during the late Victorian period. Some development occurred in the Edwardian era but another large spurt in growth happened during the 1920s and 30s.

- 1902: Tooting Library opened as a one-storey structure. A second storey was added in 1906. In 2012 the library was extended and refurbished
- 1906: Tooting Bec Lido opened
- 1930: St Benedict's Hospital established by the London County Council
- 1931: Granada cinema opened with the film Monte Carlo
- 1954: St George's Hospital begins to relocate to Tooting from Hyde Park Corner, taking over the old Grove Fever and Fountain Hospitals
- 2003: Atkinson Morley Hospital in Wimbledon closes, with services moving into the new Atkinson Morley Wing at St George's Hospital.

== Politics ==
The Member of Parliament for Tooting is Dr Rosena Allin-Khan of the Labour Party, who was first elected in a 2016 by-election to represent the parliamentary constituency of Tooting. This followed the election of her predecessor Sadiq Khan to the role of Mayor of London in May 2016.

Since the creation of the Tooting seat, it has been held by Labour, often with a marginal result against a Conservative Party challenge. Although the constituency boundaries include wards represented by both Labour and the Conservatives, the Tooting ward itself can be regarded as a Labour stronghold, electing a full slate of councillors from the party.

== Demographics ==
Tooting has a large British Asian community and has gained the nickname "land of the curry mile" due to the concentration of South Asian restaurants.

In the 2011 census, Tooting was White or White British (47%), Asian or Asian British (28.8%), Black or Black British (15.5%), Mixed/multiple ethnic groups (5%), and Other ethnic group (2.9%). The largest single ethnicity is White British (32.4%).

The main spoken first languages are English, followed by Urdu, Punjabi, Polish and Gujarati.

== Transport ==
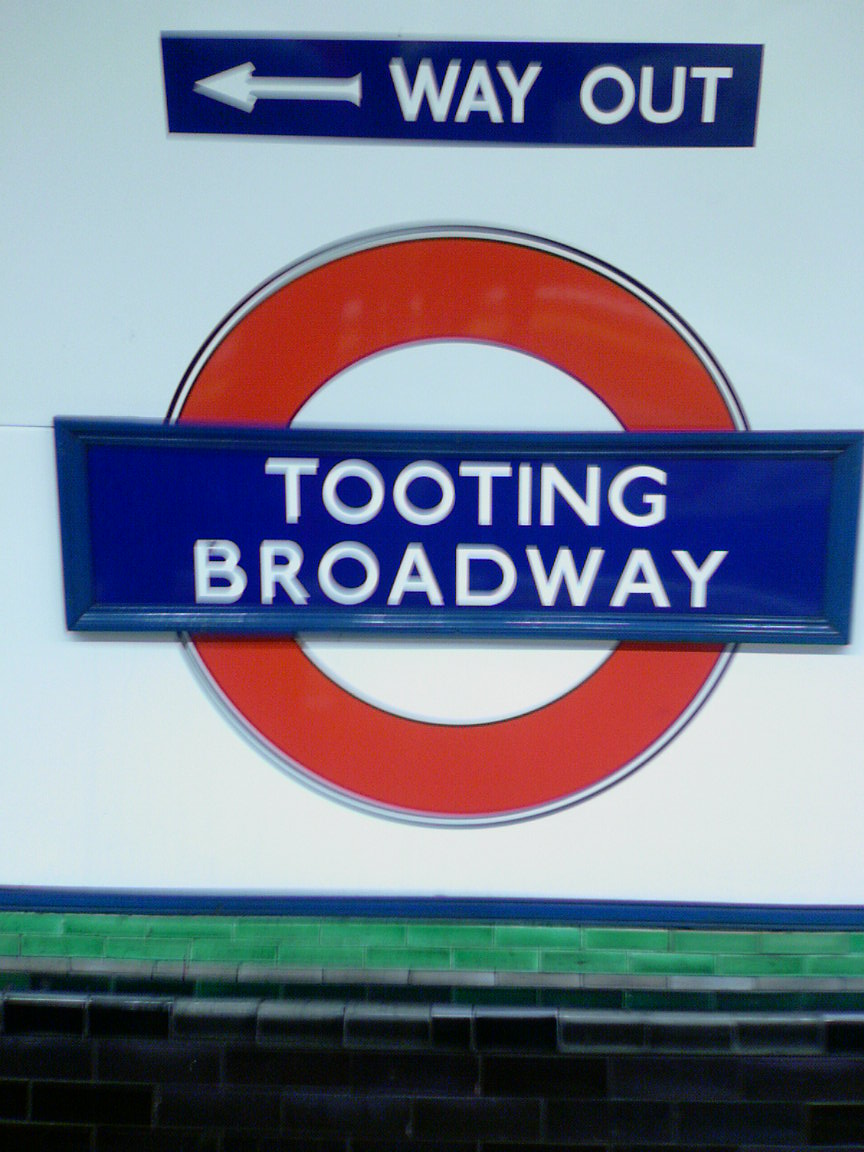
Tooting Broadway Underground Roundel

Tooting is positioned on the Northern line—with stations at the top and the bottom of the hill that slopes down the High Street, Tooting Bec and Tooting Broadway. Tooting is also served by National Rail at Tooting railway station providing a direct link south to Sutton via Wimbledon, and north to Farringdon, St Pancras and on to Luton.

It also has several bus links, with routes to and from Central London, Richmond, Croydon, Sutton and Kingston amongst others.

Tooting Broadway tube station is currently being considered by TfL as a stop on the future Crossrail 2 development. In addition to relieving congestion on the Northern Line, this would provide Tooting with a rapid and direct connection to major London stations such as nearby Clapham Junction, Victoria, Tottenham Court Road and Euston.

== Conservation area ==
Totterdown Fields estate was designated a conservation area on 19 September 1978. It was the first London County Council cottage estate built between 1901 and 1911, containing 1244 individual houses over 38 acres (15 ha). It was influenced by Ebenezer Howard's Garden city movement and the Arts and Crafts movement.

== Social housing estates ==
As previously mentioned, Totterdown Fields estate has considerable historical significance, being the first "cottage estate" within London and later protected from redevelopment through its designation as a conservation area. Within the London Borough of Wandsworth, Tooting has the fourth-highest number of social housing accommodation after Roehampton, Battersea and Southfields in that order. Notable large post-modern estates within the area are the: Aboyne/Holborn and Hazelhurst with smaller estates including: Bevill Allen Close, Burtop Road, Copeland House, Flowersmead, Newlands and Tooting Grove.

== Open spaces ==
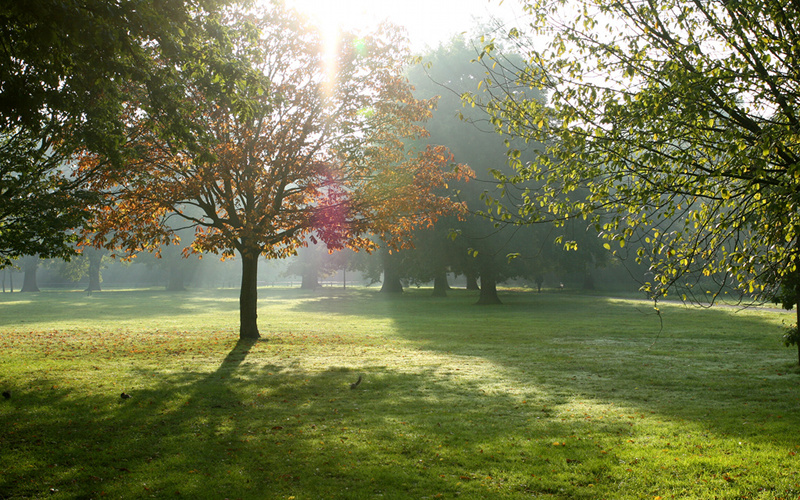
Sun over Tooting Common

A large open area, popularly known as the Tooting Commons, lies at the northern end of Tooting. Historically this was two separate open spaces: Tooting Graveney Common (formerly part of Tooting Graveney parish), and Tooting Bec Common (formerly part of Streatham parish). The commons are home to Tooting Bec Lido, which is 91.5 m × 30 m (300 ft × 98 ft).

== Sport ==
Tooting shares two football clubs with nearby Mitcham: Tooting & Mitcham FC and Tooting & Mitcham Wanderers FC.

A greyhound racing track, the 'Wimbledon Stadium', was narrowly in Tooting on Plough Lane. AFC Wimbledon moved to the site in 2021.

== Markets ==
Tooting has two indoor markets, with numbers of permanent stalls. The entrances of both are situated on the same street, Tooting High Street, only a few metres apart. They both have many types of outlets, but since the 2010s have also developed a focus on street food stalls. Tooting Market is the smaller of the two; the other, The Broadway Market, is one of the largest of London's indoor markets, having more than ninety stalls, and has been active since 1936.

== Notable people ==
- Stephen K Amos (b. 1967), comedian
- Raymond Austin, aka Raymond DeVere-Austin, Baron of Delvin, film stuntman, actor, TV and film director, author
- Darren Bent (b. 1984), professional footballer
- Jamie Bulloch (b. 1969), translator
- Jeremy Bulloch (1945–2020), actor, best known for playing Boba Fett in the early Star Wars films
- Dave Clement (1948–1982), professional footballer
- George Cole (1925–2015), actor
- Sadie Crawford (1885–1965), stage musician
- Eliza Filby, historian
- Fuse ODG (b. 1988), rapper
- Girlschool, band
- Milton Jones (b. 1965), comedian
- Rachel Agatha Keen (b. 1997), also known as Raye, pop & R&B singer, notable for songs like "Where Is My Husband!" and "Escapism"
- Sadiq Khan (b. 1970), Labour politician (Mayor of London, former Tooting MP)
- Ramona Marquez (b. 2001), actress
- Tony Meo (b. 1959), professional snooker player
- Paul Merton (b. 1957), comedian
- Clinton Morrison (b. 1979), professional footballer
- New Musik, band
- Natasha O'Keeffe (b. 1986), actress
- Gino Rea (b. 1989), motorcycle racer
- Leroy Rosenior (b. 1964), professional football coach
- Sangharakshita, writer, Buddhist commentator, and founder of the Triratna Buddhist Community, born Dennis Lingwood in Tooting
- Bas Savage (b. 1982), professional footballer
- Tony Selby (1938–2021), actor
- Paul Sinha (b. 1970), comedian and broadcaster
- Snakefinger (1949–1987), musician
- Richard Strange (b. 1951), musician
- Jay Tabb (b. 1984), professional footballer
- Quade Taylor (b. 1993), professional footballer
- UK Subs, band
- Henning Wehn (b. 1974), comedian
- Jimmy White (b. 1962), professional snooker player
- Matt Willis (b. 1983), musician
- Alan Gowen (1947–1981), musician

== Cultural references ==
Films and television programmes set in Tooting include the BBC comedy series Hugh & I (1962–67), set in the fictional Lobelia Avenue, the 2013 British-Tamil crime drama Gangs of Tooting Broadway, and the BBC comedy series Citizen Smith (1977–80), which popularised the cry "Freedom for Tooting!". The lead character in the series, Wolfie Smith (Robert Lindsay), was the founder of a fictional revolutionary socialist political organisation, the Tooting Popular Front. Channel 4's award-winning documentary series 24 Hours in A&E was filmed at St George's Hospital in Tooting.

In André Charlot's West End revue The Charlot Show of 1926, Jessie Matthews and Henry Lytton, Jnr. sang "Silly Little Hill", which features the lyric "there's no fishing, there’s no shooting dear / and no cyclists fresh from Tooting dear", which they also recorded that year. The Kitchens of Distinction (who formed in the area) recorded "On Tooting Broadway Station" on their album The Death of Cool (1992).

In 2005, a 28 km diameter crater on Mars was named after Tooting. A geological map of Tooting Crater was published in 2015 by the U.S. Geological Survey.
