= Barbara Mitchelhill =

- Genre: Middle grade fiction Historical fiction

Website
- www.barbaramitchelhill.com

Barbara Mitchelhill is a children's author of Run Rabbit Run and Road to London in addition to the Damian Drooth series for younger children. She is winner of Solihull Children's Book Award for her book Storm Runners and the Stockton Book of the Year for Run Rabbit Run.

"Barbara Mitchelhill was born in Rochdale and trained as a teacher. While she was teaching, she began writing for BBC children's TV and went on to write for educational publishers, before writing novels for children. She makes school visits all over the country, and enjoys appearing at literary festivals and talking to teachers and librarians, some as far away as the Caribbean. Her hobbies include reading, theatre, music, gardening and walking her border terrier, Ella. She lives in Staffordshire and has two grown-up daughters and four grandchildren."

Gruesome Ghosts, in the Damian Drooth series, was published in 2009. During this time she has worked with the Scottish Book Trust, and St Dominic's Priory School, Stone and is published by Random House

In 2010 Mitchelhill was awarded the Solihull Children's Book Award.
