= Balham station =

London Underground and railway station

Balham
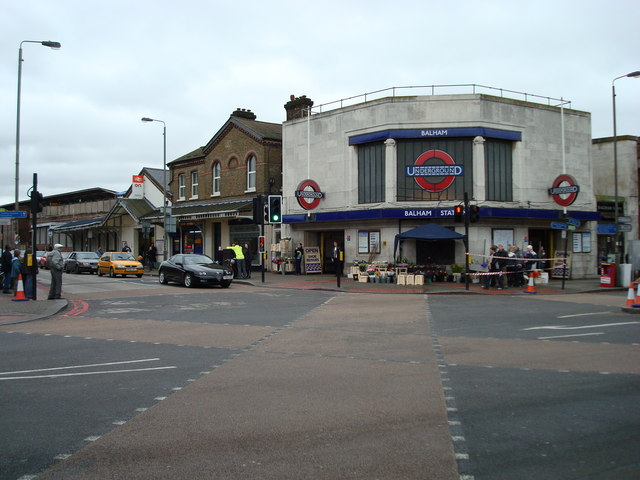
- Balham station east building including shared entrance
- Interactive map of Balham

General information
- Location: Balham
- Local authority: London Borough of Wandsworth
- Managed by: Southern; London Underground
- Owners: Network Rail; London Underground
- Station code: BAL
- DfT category: C2
- Number of platforms: 4 (National Rail); 2 (Underground)
- Fare zone: 3

London Underground annual entry and exit
- 2021: ▲5.36 million
- 2022: ▲9.22 million
- 2023: ▲9.83 million
- 2024: ▼9.81 million
- 2025: ▲9.88 million

National Rail annual entry and exit
- 2020–21: ▼2.044 million
- Interchange: ▼0.129 million
- 2021–22: ▲3.689 million
- Interchange: ▲0.229 million
- 2022–23: ▲4.176 million
- Interchange: ▼0.184 million
- 2023–24: ▲5.213 million
- Interchange: ▲0.238 million
- 2024–25: ▲5.955 million
- Interchange: ▲0.267 million

Railway companies
- Original company: London, Brighton and South Coast Railway (National Rail); City and South London Railway (London Underground)
- Pre-grouping: London, Brighton and South Coast Railway
- Post-grouping: Southern Railway

Key dates
- 1 December 1856: first station opened as Balham Hill
- 1863: present station opened (LB&SCR)
- 6 December 1926: Opened (C&SLR)
- 14 October 1940: Closed for repairs (Underground)
- 12 January 1941: Reopened (Underground)

Listed status
- Listing grade: II (Underground station)
- Entry number: 1225887
- Added to list: 16 June 1987; 39 years ago

Other information
- External links: TfL station info page; Departures; Facilities
- Coordinates: 51.4432°N 0.1525°W

Balham (/ˈbæləm/) is an interchange station in south-west London. It is located in central Balham in the London Borough of Wandsworth for London Underground and National Rail services.

The station is formed of a range of underground entrances for the Underground's Northern line and a shared entrance with its National Rail station component. The tube can be accessed on each side of the Balham High Road (A24); National Rail on the south side of the road leading east, where the track is on a mixture of light-brick high viaduct and earth embankment, quadruple track and on a brief east–west axis.

On the National Rail network it is 4 miles 52 chains (7.5 km) from London Victoria.

It is in London fare zone 3. The conjoined stations are owned and operated separately with different ticket machines and gatelines.

== National Rail station ==
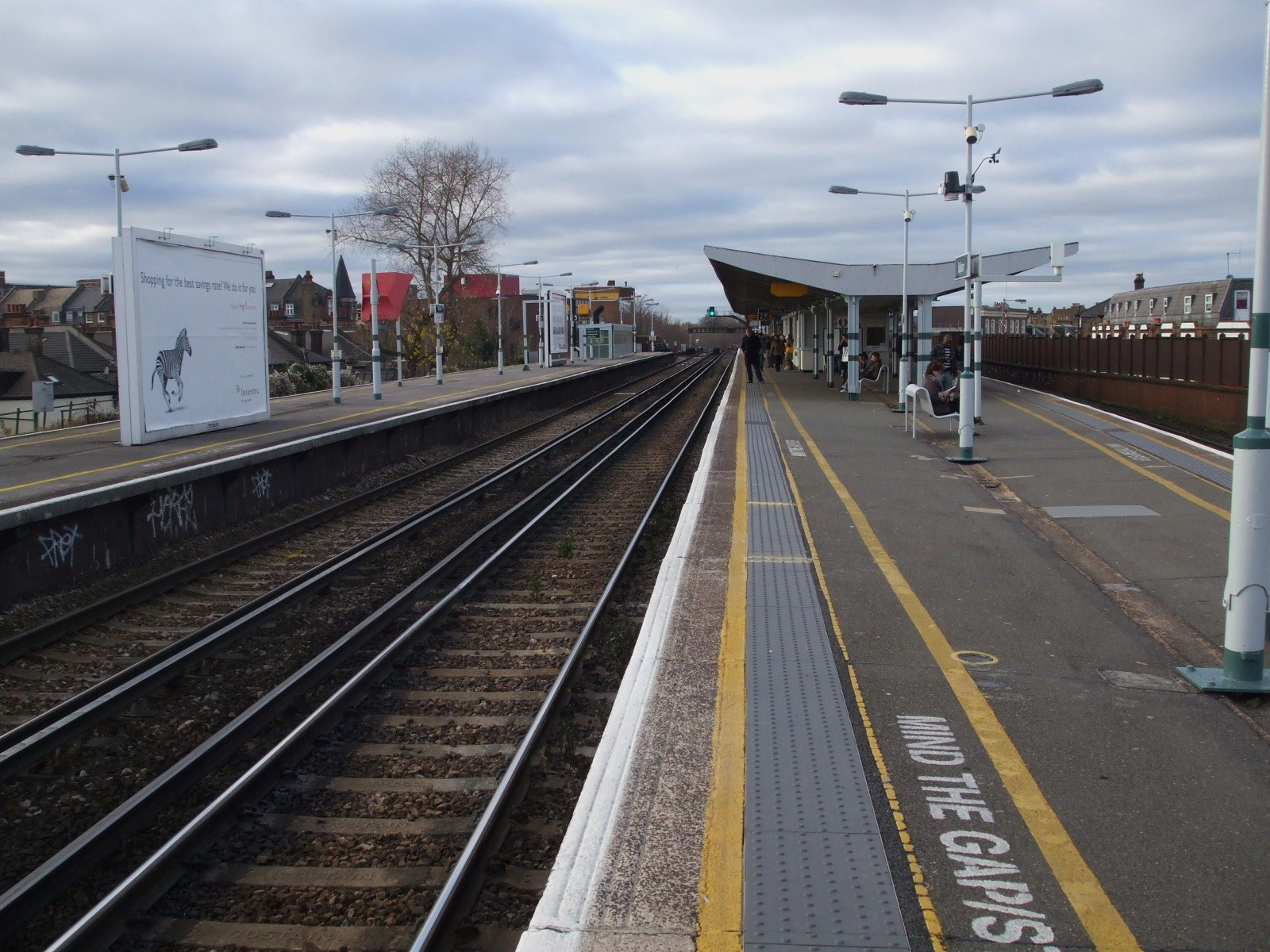
Platforms looking west towards Wandsworth Common

The National Rail station is on the Brighton Main Line, four stops from London Victoria. On a north–south route, the tracks pass through Balham on an approximate east–west axis, with Victoria towards the west. The station is managed by Southern. The platforms are on embankment between bridges over Balham High Road and Bedford Hill. Access to the platforms is via an underpass beneath them. There are four tracks and four platforms. The station is between Wandsworth Common and either Streatham Hill, Streatham Common or Mitcham Eastfields.

=== History ===
The West End of London and Crystal Palace Railway opened a station named Balham Hill on 1 December 1856.

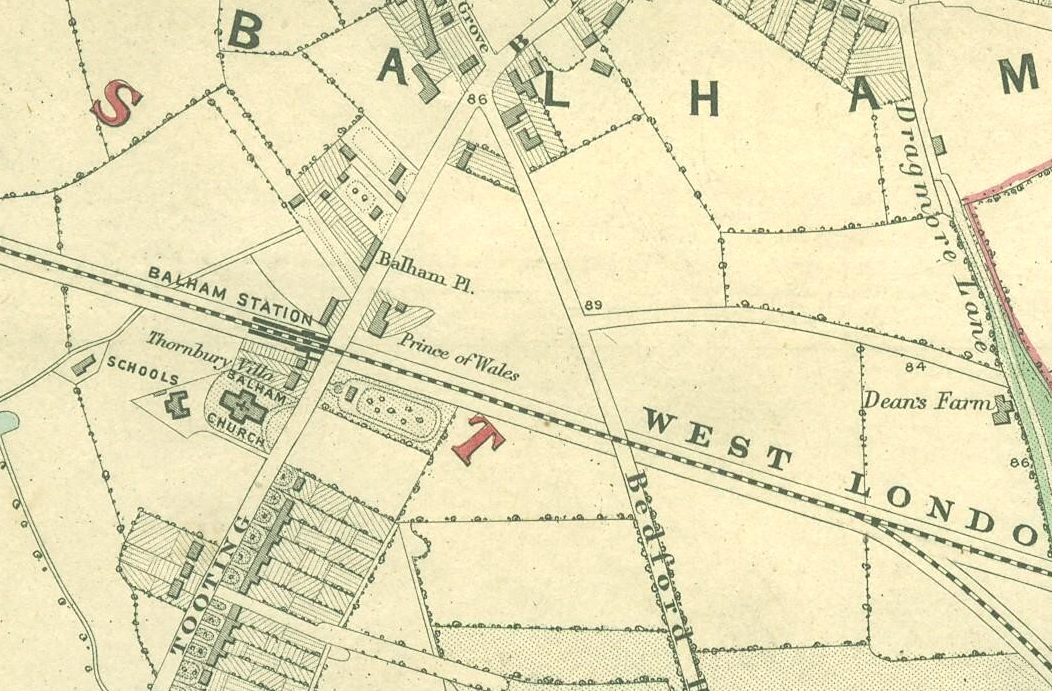
Original location, 1862

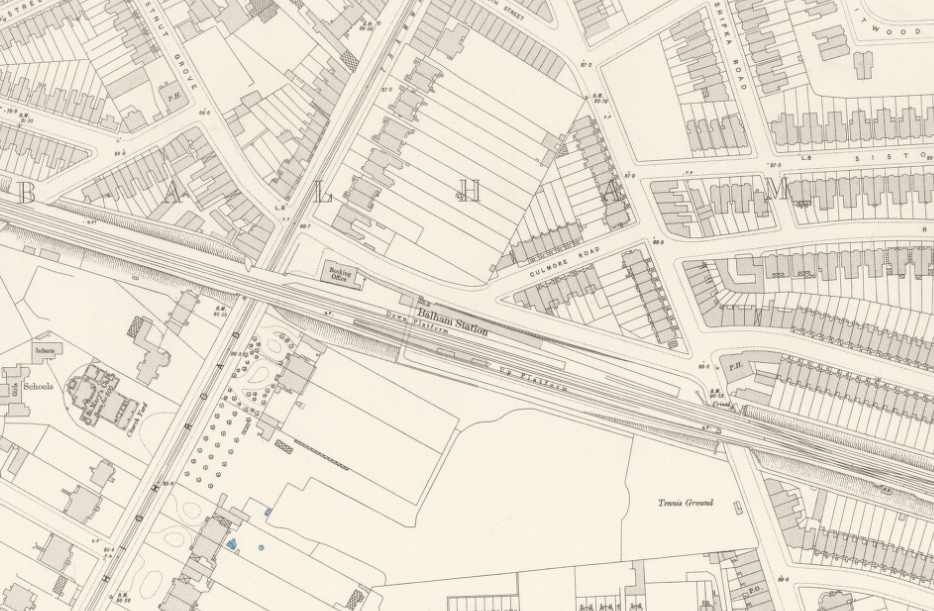
Rebuilt location, 1895

Balham station

The original station was on the west side of Balham High Road; it was re-sited by the LB&SCR in 1863 as part of works to widen the line, and improve the route between East Croydon and Victoria. Further remodelling of the line was undertaken in 1890 and 1897 to increase capacity. It was named Balham then renamed Balham and Upper Tooting on 9 March 1927, reverting to Balham on 6 October 1969.

The lines through the station to Crystal Palace were electrified in 1911, by means of the LB&SCR 'Elevated Electric' overhead system. Work on electrifying the remaining services through the station had begun in 1913 but was interrupted by the First World War and not completed until 1925. By this time the LB&SCR had been absorbed into the Southern Railway following the Railways Act 1921. In 1925 the Southern Railway decided to adopt a third rail electrification system and the lines through the station were converted between June 1928 and September 1929.

Impressions of Balham

one of four bronze reliefs

The station has a high brick wall along Balham Station Road on which four cold cast bronze reliefs are mounted and titled "Impressions of Balham". These depict local residents and everyday scenes. They were conceived and constructed by Christine Thomas and Julia Barton and installed in 1991 for Wandsworth Borough Council.

== London Underground station ==
The London Underground station opened on 6 December 1926 as part of the Morden extension of the City and South London Railway south from Clapham Common. The line and other stations on the extension had opened earlier, on 13 September 1926. The station is between Clapham South and Tooting Bec stations on the Northern line.

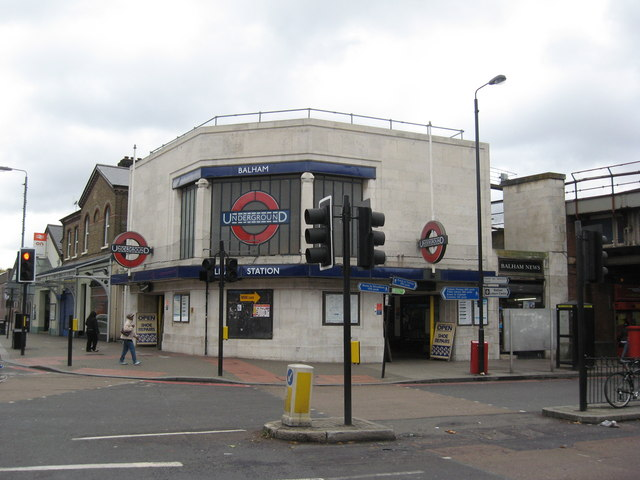
East building

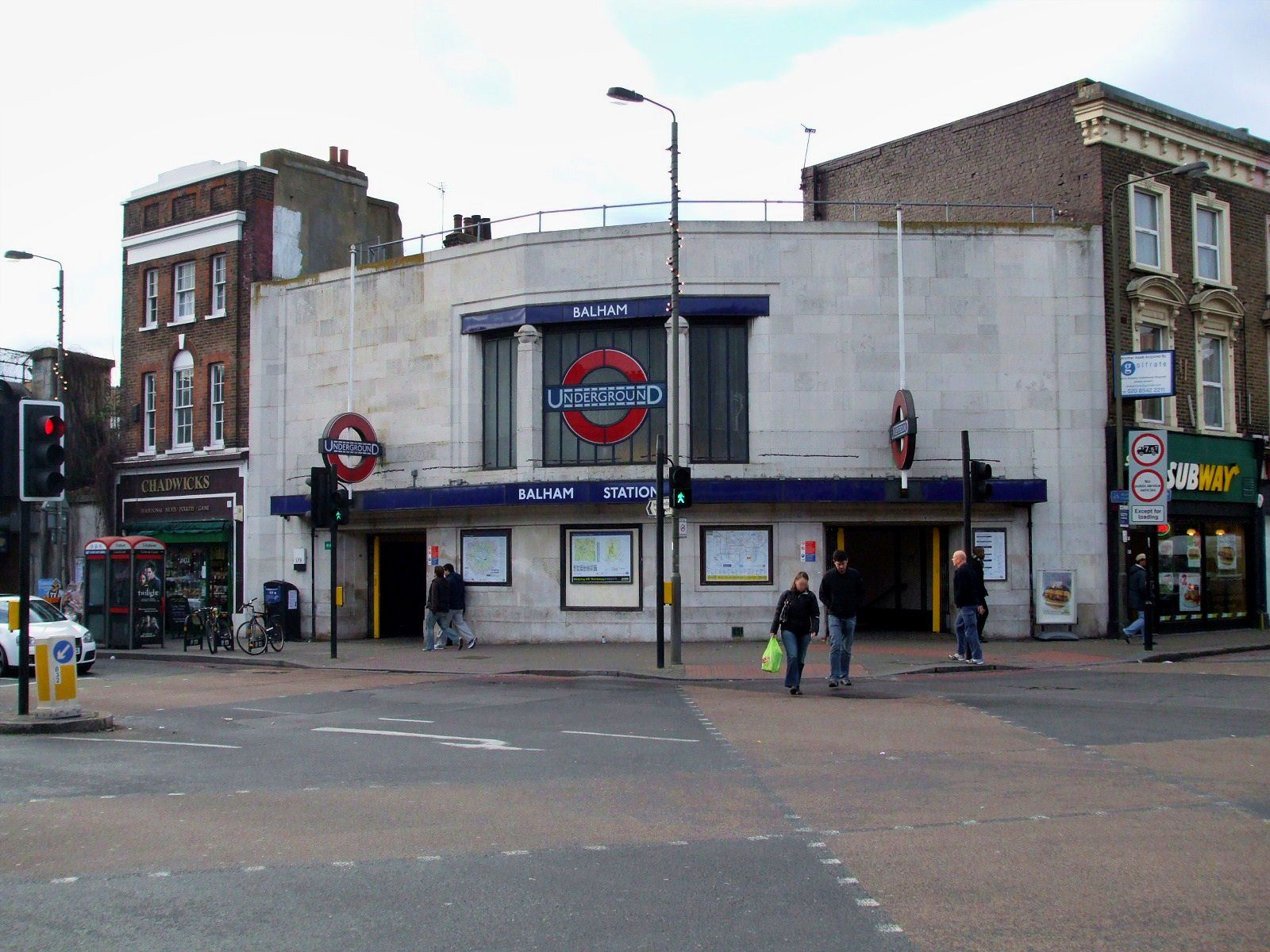
West building

Underground station

Along with the other stations on the Morden extension, the building was designed by architect Charles Holden. They were Holden's first major project for the Underground. He was selected by Frank Pick, general manager of the Underground Electric Railways Company of London (UERL), to design the stations after he was dissatisfied with designs produced by the UERL's own architect, Stanley Heaps. The Underground station buildings are listed Grade II.

The station has entrances on the east and west sides of Balham High Road linked by a pedestrian subway. The modernist designs of each building take the form of double-height screens clad in white Portland stone with three-part glazed screens in the centres of the façades divided by columns of which the capitals are three-dimensional versions of the Underground roundel. The central panel of the screens contain a large version of the roundel. Balham is the only station on the Morden branch of the Northern line conjoined to a National Rail station.

=== Second World War ===
During the Second World War, Balham was one of many deep tube stations designated for use as a civilian air raid shelter. On the evening of 14 October 1940, a 1,400 kg semi-armour piercing fragmentation bomb fell on the road above the northern end of the platform tunnels, creating a large crater into which an out-of-service bus then crashed. The northbound platform tunnel partially collapsed and was filled with earth and water from the fractured water mains and sewers above, which also flowed through the cross-passages into the southbound platform tunnel, with the flooding and debris reaching to within 100 yards (91 m) of Clapham South. According to the Commonwealth War Graves Commission (CWGC), sixty-six people in the station were killed – although some sources report 64 shelterers and four railway staff were killed, and more than seventy injured. The damage at track level closed the line to traffic between Tooting Bec and Clapham Common. The closed section and station were reopened on 12 January 1941.

The second memorial plaque in the entrance hall, in place 2010–2016

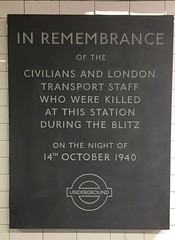
The memorial plaque unveiled on 16 October 2016

In October 2000 a memorial plaque commemorating this event was placed in the station's ticket hall. It stated that 64 people died, which differed from the CWGC register at the time, and other sources. On 14 October 2010 this was replaced with a new commemorative plaque which does not state the number of fatalities. This second plaque was again replaced with an official memorial stone in Welsh slate commissioned by London Underground and that was unveiled on 14 October 2016. The two removed plaques were given to the London Transport Museum.

The bombing of the station during the war is briefly mentioned in Ian McEwan's 2001 novel Atonement, while the 2007 film based on the book depicts the station's flooding, in which a main character is killed. A character dates the event incorrectly (September in the novel; 15 October in the film). The film also refers to the fracturing of gas mains, as well as water. The bombing of the station is also featured in the children's novel Billy's Blitz by Barbara Mitchelhill when Billy and his family are sheltering in the tube station on the night of 14 October 1940. Ben Aaronovitch's 2012 novel, Whispers Under Ground, also mentions the flooding.

A radio documentary exploring the background to the bombing and events on the day was broadcast on Riverside Radio to mark the 80th anniversary of the bomb on 14 October 2020.

Director Steve McQueen made a 2024 film, Blitz, about the wartime bombing of London (the Blitz), depicting and partly inspired by this event.

== Services ==
=== National Rail ===
All National Rail services at Balham are operated by Southern using Class 377 EMUs.

The typical off-peak service in trains per hour is:

- 8 tph to London Victoria
- 2 tph to Epsom Downs via Norbury
- 2 tph to Dorking via Hackbridge, of which 1 continues to Horsham
- 2 tph to West Croydon via Crystal Palace
- 2 tph to London Bridge via Forest Hill
- 1 tph to East Croydon
- 1 tph to Watford Junction via Kensington (Olympia)

During the peak hours, the station is served by an additional half-hourly service between London Victoria and Sutton via Norbury. On Saturday evenings (after approximately 18:45) and on Sundays, there is no service south of Dorking to Horsham.

=== London Underground ===
London Underground services at Balham are served by the Northern line.

The typical off-peak service in trains per hour is:

- 10 tph to Edgware via Bank
- 2 tph to Mill Hill East via Bank
- 8 tph to High Barnet via Bank
- 20 tph to Morden

During the peak hours, the service is increased to up to 22 tph in each direction, including trains that run via Charing Cross.

Preceding station	National Rail	Following station
Clapham Junction	Southern Sutton & Mole Valley Lines	Mitcham Eastfields
Clapham Junction	Southern Crystal Palace Line	Streatham Hill
Clapham Junction	Southern West London Line	Streatham Common
Wandsworth Common	Southern Brighton Main Line Stopping Services	Streatham Common
Preceding station	LUL	Following station
Clapham South towards Edgware, High Barnet or Mill Hill East	Northern line	Tooting Bec towards Morden

== Connections ==
London Buses routes 155, 249, 255, 315, 355 and night route N155 serve the station.
