= Tooting Bec tube station =

London Underground station

Tooting Bec
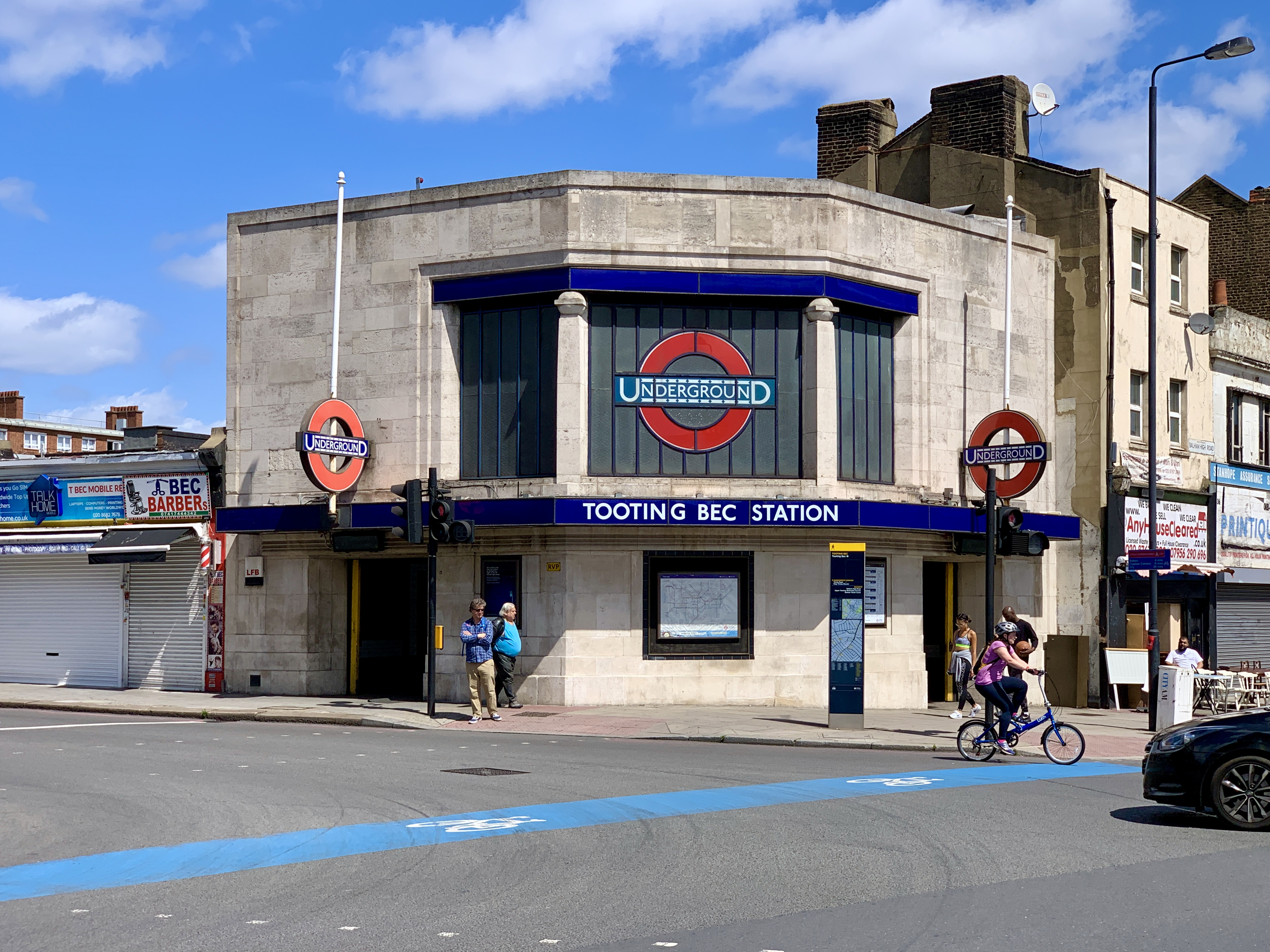
- Tooting Bec station
- Interactive map of Tooting Bec

General information
- Location: Tooting
- Local authority: Wandsworth
- Managed by: London Underground
- Owner: London Underground
- Number of platforms: 2
- Fare zone: 3

London Underground annual entry and exit
- 2020: ▼3.51 million
- 2021: ▲3.61 million
- 2022: ▲5.94 million
- 2023: ▲6.27 million
- 2024: ▲6.52 million

Railway companies
- Original company: City and South London Railway

Key dates
- 13 September 1926: Opened as Trinity Road (Tooting Bec)
- 1 October 1950: Renamed Tooting Bec

Listed status
- Listing grade: II
- Entry number: 1065477
- Added to list: 16 June 1987; 39 years ago

Other information
- External links: TfL station info page
- Coordinates: 51.435833°N 0.159°W

Tooting Bec, originally Trinity Road, is a London Underground station in Tooting in south London. It is on the Morden branch of the Northern line, between Balham and Tooting Broadway stations. The station is in London fare zone 3. It is located on the junction of Trinity Road (heading north-west), Upper Tooting Road (south-west), Balham High Road (north-east), Tooting Bec Road (south-east) and Stapleton Road (also south-east).

== History ==
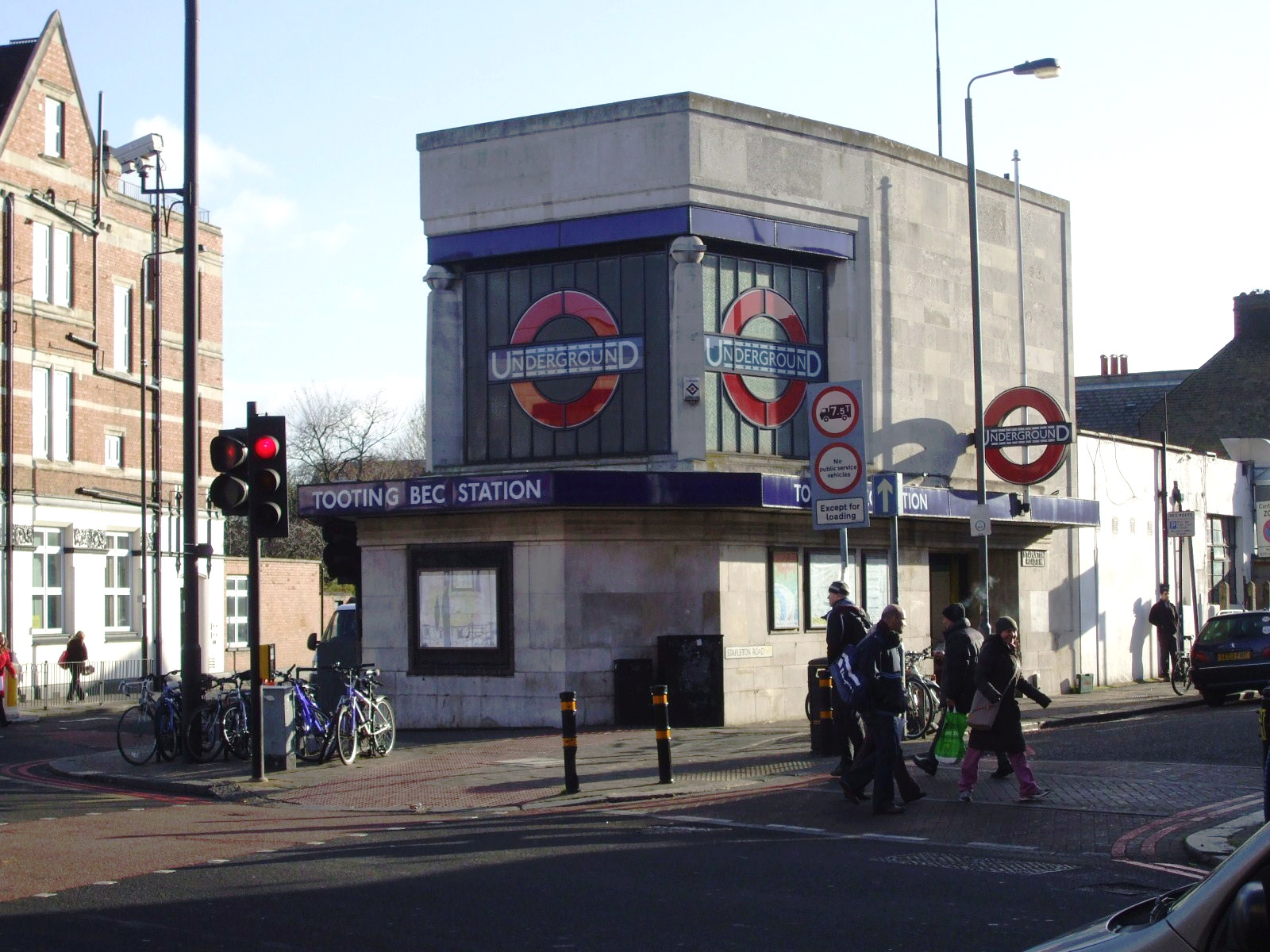
The narrow satellite building on the east side of the junction, which provides a pedestrian subway access to the main station premises

The station was designed by Charles Holden and opened on 13 September 1926 as part of the Morden extension of the City & South London Railway, which is now part of the Northern line. Originally known as Trinity Road (Tooting Bec), it was given its present name on 1 October 1950.

The narrow satellite building on the east side of the junction provides pedestrian subway access to the station and is unusual in that it has a large glazed roundel on each of the three panels of its glazed screen, as normally the Morden extension stations have the roundel in just the centre panel. For many years the northern panel of the screen was the sole example on any of the Morden extension stations to retain the 1920s "UNDERGROUND" lettering, the other stations' screens having been replaced with plain glass over the years. All the stations have now had the original motif replaced along with the flag-pole-mounted roundels that had been removed in the 1950s.

On the platforms the station has two examples of clocks from the Self Winding Clock Company of New York City.

== Connections ==
London Buses routes 155, 219, 249, 319 and 355 and night route N155 serve the station.

Preceding station	London Underground	Following station
Balham towards Edgware, Mill Hill East or High Barnet	Northern line Morden branch	Tooting Broadway towards Morden
