= Clapham South tube station =

London Underground station

Clapham South
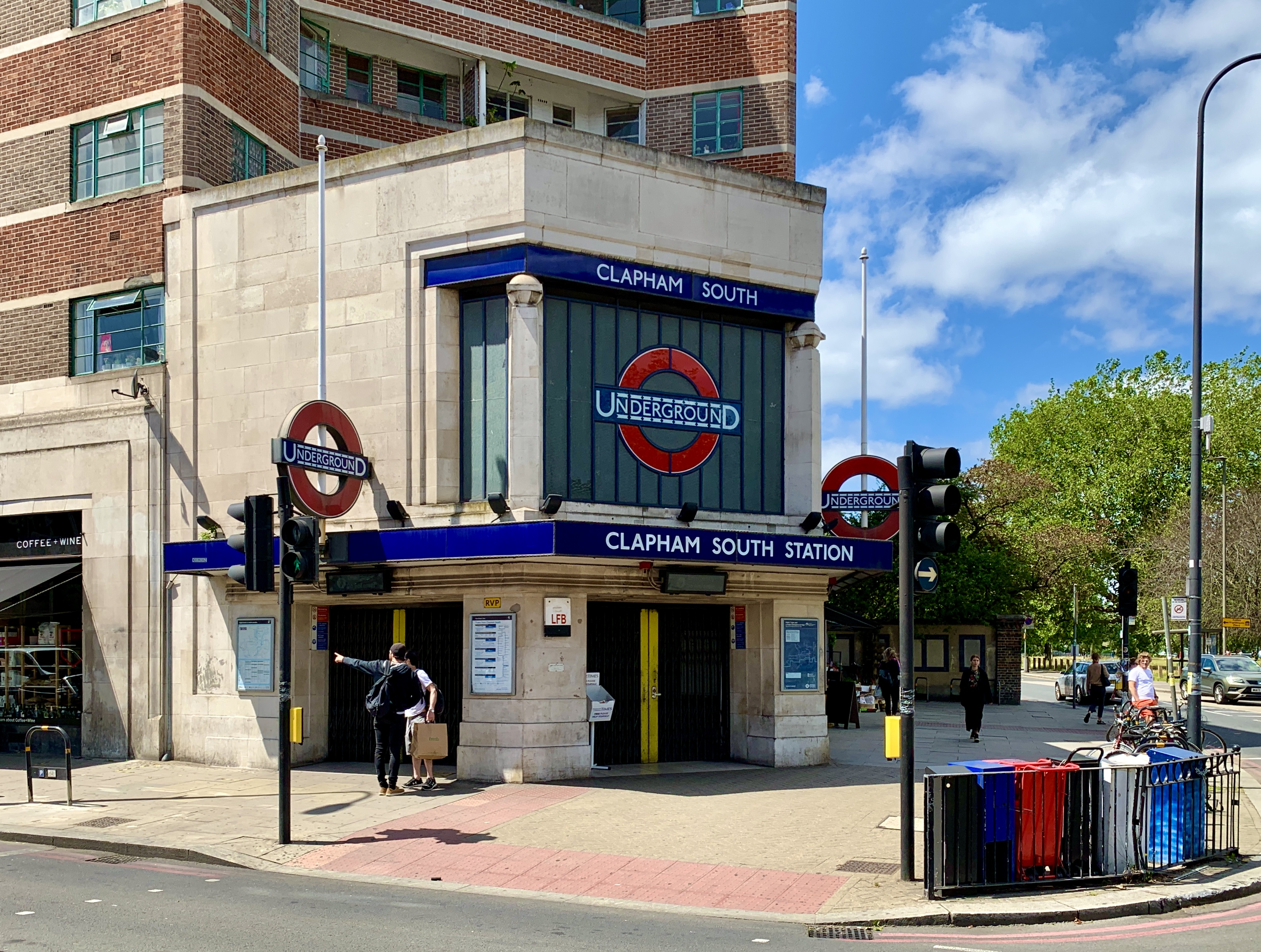
- Station entrance
- Interactive map of Clapham South

General information
- Location: Clapham, Balham
- Local authority: London Borough of Wandsworth
- Managed by: London Underground
- Owner: London Underground
- Number of platforms: 2
- Fare zone: 2 and 3

Key dates
- 13 September 1926: Opened (C&SLR)

Listed status
- Listing grade: II
- Entry number: 1266140
- Added to list: 16 June 1987; 39 years ago

Other information
- Coordinates: 51.452778°N 0.147°W

Clapham South (/ˈklæpəm ˈsaʊθ/) is a London Underground station. It is on the Morden branch of the Northern line, between Clapham Common and Balham stations. The station is in both London fare zone 2 and 3. It is located at the corner of Balham Hill (A24) and Nightingale Lane, at the southern edge of Clapham Common.

== History ==
The station was designed by Charles Holden and was opened on 13 September 1926 as the first station of the Morden extension of the City and South London Railway, which is now part of the Northern line. Other proposed names for the station prior to opening were "Balham North" and "Nightingale Lane".

The apartments above the station, named Westbury Court, were a later addition, built in the mid-1930s. The parade of shops along Balham Hill was extended as part of the same development, using the same style as the original three closest to the station.

The station was refurbished in the 1990s, with new flooring, tiling and CCTV, while ensuring that original Holden features were restored or reproduced. The restoration work was awarded a National Railway Heritage Award.

It is one of eight London Underground stations with a deep-level air-raid shelter underneath it. In 1948, the shelter was used as temporary accommodation for immigrants from Jamaica. The HMT Empire Windrush had arrived that year at Tilbury, carrying 492 immigrants recruited by the Colonial Office due to London's labour shortage after World War II. As there was no accommodation for all of the new arrivals, many were housed temporarily at Clapham South.

The underground shelter has been available to visit through London Transport Museum's Hidden London programme of guided tours since 2016.

== Connections ==
The station is served by London Buses routes 50, 155, 249, 355, G1, 690, as well as by night route N155.

Preceding station	London Underground	Following station
Clapham Common towards Edgware, Mill Hill East or High Barnet	Northern line Morden branch	Balham towards Morden
