= Merton, London =

Town in London, England

Coordinates: 51.4102°N 0.2024°W

Merton
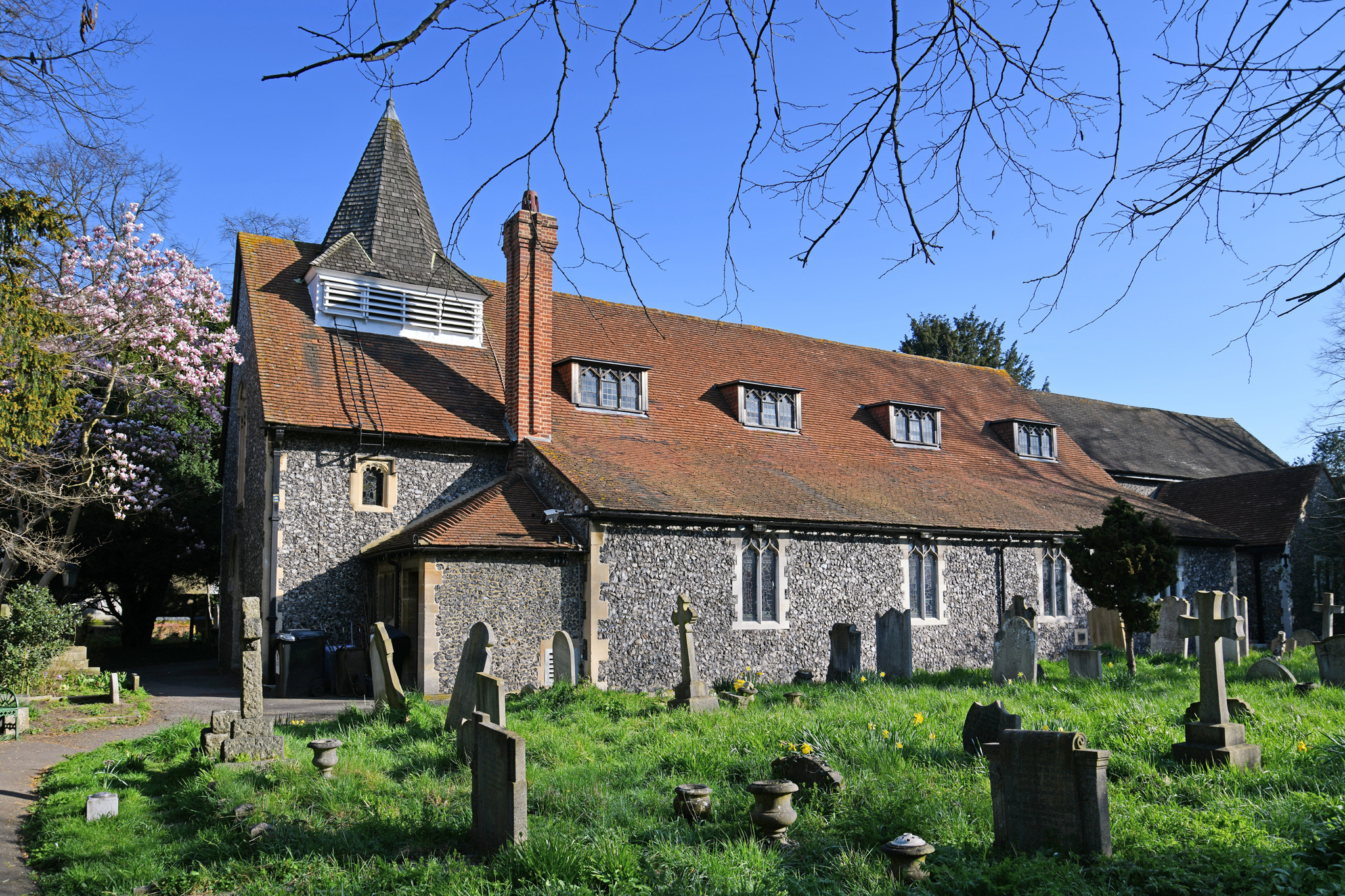
- St Mary's Church, the ancient parish church

- Location within Greater London
- London borough: Merton
- Ceremonial county: Greater London
- Region: London
- Country: England
- Sovereign state: United Kingdom
- Police: Metropolitan
- Fire: London
- Ambulance: London
- London Assembly: Merton and Wandsworth

Merton is an area in the London Borough of Merton. Merton was an ancient parish historically in Surrey, the area of which has since 1965 been part of Greater London. The parish was centred on the 12th-century parish church of St Mary in Merton Park. In 1907 the parish became Merton Urban District. On 1 April 1965 the civil parish was abolished. At the 1951 census (one of the last before the abolition of the parish), Merton had a population of 39,313. The area has formed part of the London Borough of Merton since 1965.

== History ==
Merton
- Ancient parish
- Interactive map of Merton
- Area
  - 1881: 1,765 acres
  - 1921: 1,762 acres
  - 1951: 1,762 acres
- Population
  - 1881: 2,480
  - 1921: 16,177
  - 1951: 39,313
- Density
  - 1881: 1.4/acre
  - 1921: 9.2/acre
  - 1951: 22.3/acre
- History
  - Origin: Ancient parish
  - Abolished: 1 April 1965
  - Succeeded by: London Borough of Merton
- Status: Civil parish (rural until 1907, then urban)
- Government: Merton Parish Council (1894—1907)

=== Early history ===
The village of Merton had a linear focus, stretching westwards from the Roman road Stane Street which connected London to Chichester. Locally, the road ran in a direct line from the current Colliers Wood High Street to London Road, Morden, crossing the site of Sainsbury's Savacentre and industrial estates. The name dates back at least to the 7th century, when documents record its use. Translations vary from "Farmstead by the mere (small lake)" to "Maera's homestead".

Merton appears Domesday Book as Meretone. It was revealed in Domesday Book as the largest community in the area. It was held by William the Conqueror as principal feudal overlords and its assets were: 20 hides of land; 1 church, 2 mills worth £3 per annum, 21 ploughs, 12 acres (49,000 m^{2}) of meadow, woodland worth 80 hogs. It rendered £43, added to just under an extra £1 18s 2d from 16 houses in Southwark, to its feudal overlords per annum.

=== Merton Priory or Abbey ===
The priory or abbey, also known by a third name Priory of St Mary of Merton, was founded by Gilbert Norman in 1114. It is believed to have been the birthplace of Walter de Merton, founder of Merton College, Oxford. In 1235, Henry III held negotiations here with his barons for the Statute of Merton. The Abbey provided the education of Saint Thomas Becket and, it is believed, also Nicholas Breakspear, the only English Pope.

The abbey joined almost all others in ending its existence in 1538, during Henry VIII's reign, having held land throughout the area in volume, such as holdings in Cuddington and tithes in Effingham, due to the dissolution of the monasteries. Its buildings were dismantled and the materials removed for reuse elsewhere. It is believed that, in 1496, a hospice for travellers was erected opposite the site of Sainsbury's store. An inn was built there in 1594 and beer was sold there from that date until 2004, when the King's Head closed. The existing building dates from 1931, but it has been designated as a local listed building.

=== 17th and 18th centuries ===
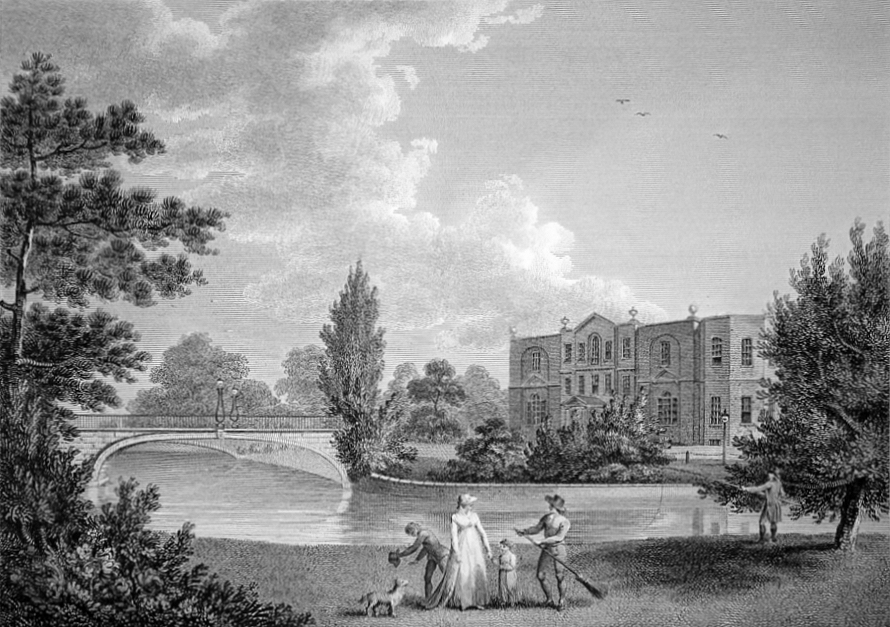
Merton Place, copperplate engraving, 18th century

The River Wandle flowing north towards Wandsworth had for centuries driven watermills and provided water for a number of industrial processes. In the 1660s a silk mill was in operation at Merton Abbey and the Jacob family was operating a fabric bleaching ground close by – a process requiring large quantities of water. The name remained associated with the locality as two hundred years later, Stanford's 1862 Library Map of London and its Suburbs shows Jacob's Green at the junction of what are now Christchurch Road and Western Road.

Textile production became the established industry in the area in the 18th century, with calico printing beginning in the 1720s.

In 1764 the merchant Richard Hotham, a member of the East India Company, purchased Moat House Farm, a property to the south of Merton High Street. He began developing the property, enlarging the house and renaming it "Merton Place". He first leased then later sold the house to one of the partners in a local calico works, Charles Greaves.

Hotham next built another house, to the north-west of the junction of Kingston Road and Morden Road. This he called "Hotham House" (later "Merton Grove") and it remained in his possession until his death in 1799.

=== 19th century ===
Merton (parish) population
| 1801 | 813 |
| 1811 | 905 |
| 1821 | 1,177 |
| 1831 | 1,447 |
| 1841 | 1,914 |
| 1851 | 1,870 |
| 1861 | 1,822 |
| 1871 | 2,139 |
| 1881 | 2,480 |
| 1891 | 3,360 |
| 1901 | 4,510 |
| 1911 | 12,938 |
| 1921 | 16,177 |
| 1931 | 28,609 |
| 1941 | war # |
| 1951 | 39,313 |
# no census was held due to war
source: United Kingdom census

Despite the industrial development along the Wandle, Merton was, at the beginning of the 19th century, still primarily a rural farming community. The population has seen spurts of rapid growth, largely accompanied by housing and shown to the right: approximately doubling from 1811 to 1841, then relatively static for 40 years, almost trebling in the 10 years to 1911, and finally, already suburban more than doubled from 1921 to 1951, creating a largely urban core.

In 1803, the Surrey Iron Railway opened between Wandsworth and Croydon, following the shallow Wandle valley and passing through Merton and Mitcham to the south. Although horse-drawn, the railway provided a freight service for the industries along the shallow river to send their goods to wharves on the Thames. From Merton High Street the railway ran along the route of Christchurch Road before turning to a more south-westerly route just before Mitcham tram stop.

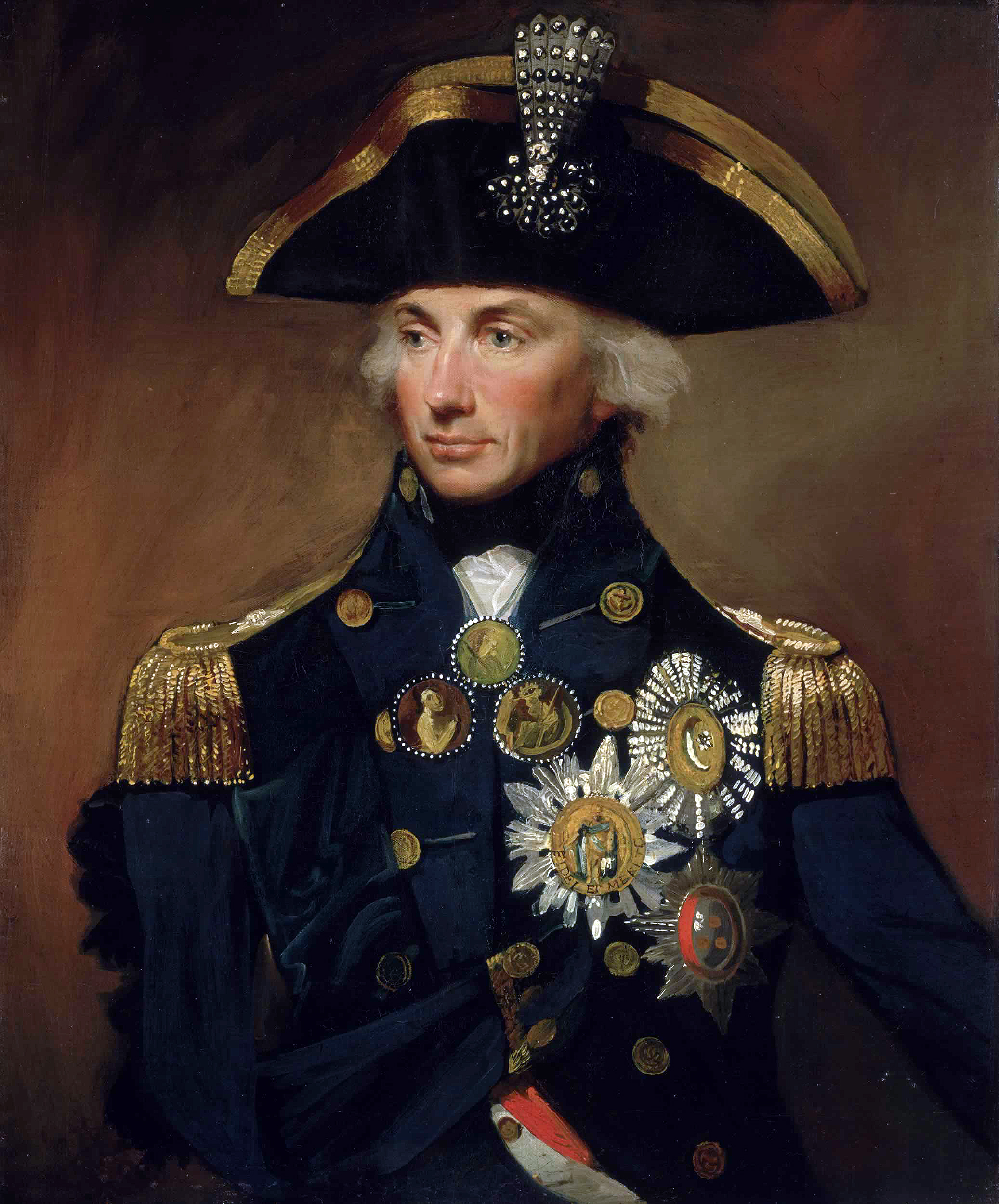
Admiral Nelson

In September 1802, Vice-Admiral Horatio Nelson, upon the advice of his mistress Emma Hamilton and her husband Sir William Hamilton, purchased Merton Place from the widow of Charles Greaves with its farm and woodland for £9,000 (equivalent to £758,547 in 2025). Built around the beginning of the 18th century in a heavy, symmetrical square in the Queen Anne style, the home had fallen into a state of terrible disrepair, but Nelson, against the advice of his solicitor, refused to put in a lower offer, borrowing money from a friend to pay for it. He expanded the estate with the purchase of additional land south of his house until his Merton property covered most of the area west of the Wandle and north of Morden Hall Park, including the area between Merton Road, South Park Road and Haydons Road. Between trips to sea, Nelson lived at Merton Place with Emma and Sir William in a ménage à trois, although the married couple also kept a London home in Piccadilly, and Emma took a smaller home nearby after Sir William's death in April 1803. Emma set about decorating the interior as a tribute to Nelson, setting a rather "gaudy and cluttered" tone which was emulated far and wide. She planned gardens and had the stream and ponds filled with fish and the grounds filled with pigs, poultry and sheep, and both she and Nelson referred to the property as "the farm". Their daughter Horatia stayed with them there for long periods.

Nelson had spent almost four years here when not at sea, before his death at the Battle of Trafalgar in October 1805. In recognition of Nelson's success and sacrifice at Trafalgar his eldest surviving brother William was made Earl Nelson and Viscount Merton in November 1805, but the latter never lived at Merton. Although Emma and Horatia were not provided for in the way that Nelson intended and indicated in a codicil to his will, Emma inherited Merton Place, but the small annuity that came with it was not enough to maintain the property, Nelson's relatives continued to come and stay, and Emma had to pay for fittings and furnishings which kept arriving. Soon Emma was in debt and, after passing in at auction, eventually the estate was sold in 1809, to Asher Goldsmid (brother of Emma's friend Abraham).

The house was demolished in 1821 and the estate lands were sold off in parcels over the following years. The part of the Merton Place estate immediately south of the High Street was developed as small-scale housing and became known as Nelson's Fields. North of the High Street the land remained undeveloped until the end of the century. The site's history is reflected in the local streetnames: Nelson Road, Trafalgar Road, Victory Road, Hardy Road and Hamilton Road.

Competition from the newer, steam-powered railways caused the closure of the Surrey Iron Railway in 1846. Part of the route was later reused by the Wimbledon and Croydon Railway when it opened in 1855 through Merton, Morden and Mitcham.

In the 1860s, a flour works sat at the junction of Bygrove Road and Wandle Bank and there was a copper rolling mill on Merton High Street where later the Merton Board Mills would be built. This was in the possession of James Shears and Sons by 1815, and remained in their possession until at least 1867. Further south, the Merton Abbey Mills complex had developed each side of the river on land adjacent to Merton Abbey House.

In 1868, the Tooting, Merton and Wimbledon Railway (TM&WR) opened a branch line from the Wimbledon and Croydon Railway between Merton Park station (now Merton Park tram stop) and Tooting Junction station (now Tooting station). Cutting through Nelson's former estate and the site of Merton Abbey, Merton Abbey station was constructed to the south of Station Road to serve the industrial complex there. William Shears, a member of the Shears family, was one of the directors of this company.

Continuing the long association of Merton with textile printing, the Arts and Crafts designer William Morris opened Merton Abbey Works in 1881. Close by, the firm of Edmund Littler at Merton Abbey Mills was known for its high-quality printing and was by the 1890s sending its entire production to Liberty & Co. in Regent Street. Liberty & Co. subsequently took over the production at Merton from Littler.

Industry developed further around the Wandle and residential development began in the late Victorian period north of the High Street and along Kingston Road and in Merton Park. In 1894, when a new Local Government Act was implemented, the parish of Merton was still considered sufficiently rural to be included as part of the Croydon Rural District (CRD).

=== 20th century ===
Phipps Bridge in the early 1900s, showing the rural character of this part of Merton

Following the earlier lead of neighbouring Wimbledon, Merton underwent a transformation in the first two decades of the 20th century that saw its fields developed from east to west. Population growth lead to the removal of Merton from the CRD and the creation of the separately administered Merton Urban District in 1907. Between 1901 and 1921 the parish's population nearly quadrupled from 4,510 to 16,177.

In 1913, the parish of Morden was also removed from the CRD and merged with the Merton Urban District to form the Merton and Morden Urban District.

Hotham's Merton Grove House survived until the beginning of the 20th century, but had been demolished and redeveloped for housing by 1913. The Grove Tavern on the opposite side of Kingston Road remembers the name.

Growth was stimulated and assisted by the arrival of trams in Merton High Street in the first decade of the century and the opening of a new bus garage at the east end of Merton High Street in 1913. The combination of tram services and the extension of the Underground Electric Railways Company of London's City & South London Railway through Colliers Wood and South Wimbledon to Morden, in 1926, destroyed demand for passenger services on the Merton Abbey branch line and these were ended in 1929. Goods operations continued until 1975, when the line was closed and the tracks lifted.

Liberty & Co. continued to operate the Merton Abbey Mills until 1972. From the 1930s, extensive industrial estates were laid out from Lombard Road on the southern part of the former Merton Place estate between Morden Road and Phipps Bridge.

The section of the TM&WR route east of Morden Road was used to construct Merantun Way (A24) in the early 1990s. The road was built to relieve traffic congestion on Merton High Street and was originally planned to continue to the west, along the route of the defunct railway to Kingston Road, with a flyover across Morden Road. This section of the route was never constructed, although the space between the carriageways where Merantun Way meets Morden Road provides the space for a flyover bridge to be constructed.

1920s Map of most of South Wimbledon & Colliers Wood

During the 20th century, the waters of the Wandle became less important to the industries remaining in the Merton Abbey complex and, in the 1980s and 1990s, the majority of these closed down or moved elsewhere. The Sainsbury's Savacentre occupies part of the site and the Mill buildings were refurbished and developed as a popular heritage and craft centre. The Colour House, where Liberty dyed fabric, was opened as a theatre in 1995. The ruined chapterhouse of the Abbey was also used as a venue for several theatrical performances in the late 1990s.

When automatic telephone exchanges were introduced in the UK, the code for the Merton and South Wimbledon telephone exchange was set as 542 and used the mnemonic "LIBerty", based on the numbers on a telephone to which the letters are assigned; the mnemonic was derived from Liberty fabric works. The use of letter codes was dropped in the late 1960s.

== Geography ==
Until the 20th century, most of the parish remained rural in character and the main residential and commercial centres were at Merton Park and along Merton High Street between modern South Wimbledon and Colliers Wood. Other modern areas included within the parish area are:

- Wimbledon Chase
- Southern Raynes Park
- Motspur Park/West Barnes

It is bounded by Wimbledon to the north, Mitcham to the east, Morden, Cheam and Cuddington (Worcester Park and rest of Motspur Park) to the south and (New) Malden to the west. The 1871 Ordnance Survey map records its area as 1,764.7 acres (7.1 km^{2}) (2.7 sq mi).

== Heritage ==
A small memorial exists on the site of Merton Place. Other commemorations of Nelson's association with the parish are the former Nelson Hospital on Kingston Road, reopened in 2015 as the Nelson Health Centre; and, until it was closed in 2011, the Emma Hamilton public house at Wimbledon Chase.

The Nelson Trading Estate off Morden Road and Hamilton, Hardy, Nelson, Victory and Trafalgar Roads, off Merton High Street, are all built on land once part of the Merton Place estate.

Nelson's and Emma's pew remains in the parish church of St Mary the Virgin and on the wall of the north aisle of the church are the funerary hatchments of both Nelson and Sir William Hamilton. Outside the church, on Church Path, are "Nelson's Steps" (now somewhat overgrown), reputedly used by Nelson to mount his horse. This forms part of a small conservation area.

Construction works in the Merton Abbey area, including those for Merantun Way, have revealed remains of Merton Priory which have been protected and preserved where possible. Further archaeological excavations are planned.

== Eponyms ==
In 1881, all but one of the main concentrations of the surname Merton in Great Britain were outside South East England, with the sole exception being in the DA postcode area; this demonstrates that the surname derives from places other than the Merton now in Greater London. The borough of Merton is among the 24 London boroughs (out of 32) to be named after a medieval parish or city.

== Notable people associated with the parish of Merton ==
- Elizabeth Alexander, geologist and physicist
- Raymond Austin, television and film director, television writer, novelist, stunt performer and actor
- Thomas Becket, educated at Merton Abbey
- Nicholas Breakspear (Pope Adrian IV), educated at Merton Abbey
- Elisabeth Dermot Walsh, English actress
- David Garrick, actor and dramatist – lived at Church House
- James Pierrepont Greaves, educational reformer, mystic and "sacred socialist" – born in the parish
- Emma Hamilton, mistress of Nelson
- William Hamilton, diplomat and husband of Emma Hamilton
- Richard Hotham, developer and promoter of Bognor Regis
- John Innes, developer of Merton Park
- Lauderdale Maitland, actor
- Walter de Merton, Lord Chancellor and Bishop of Rochester – educated at Merton Abbey and founder of Merton College, Oxford
- William Morris, artist and writer
- Horatio Nelson, 1st Viscount Nelson
- Richard Brinsley Sheridan, dramatist and politician – lived at Church House
- Isaac Smith, participant in Captain James Cook's voyage on the Endeavour – lived at Merton Abbey
- Rose Emma Lamartine Yates, social campaigner and suffragette – lived at Dorset Hall in Kingston Road
