= Tooting Junction railway station =

Tooting Junction railway station may refer to:

- Tooting Junction railway station (1868-1894), the closed station
- Tooting railway station, the current station but originally named Tooting Junction when it replaced the above
