= Mitcham railway station (England) =

Former railway station in England

Coordinates: 51.397539°N 0.171125°W

Mitcham
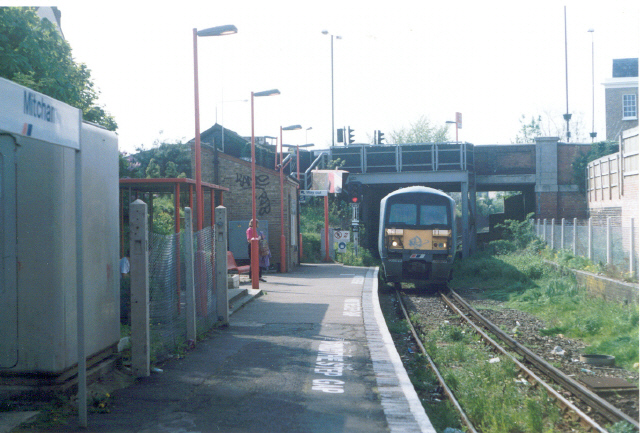
- Former Mitcham Station

- Location of Mitcham in Greater London
- Location: Mitcham
- Local authority: London Borough of Merton
- Grid reference: TQ272681
- Owner: Railtrack
- Number of platforms: 2 (later reduced to 1)

Railway companies
- Original company: Wimbledon and Croydon Railway
- Post-grouping: Southern Railway

Key dates
- 22 October 1855: Opened
- 2 June 1997: Closed
- Replaced by: Mitcham tram stop

Other information

Mitcham railway station was a railway station in Mitcham in the London Borough of Merton, England. It closed after the last train ran on 31 May 1997. Mitcham tram stop replaced the station, and is located just east of the original site.

== History ==
After the Surrey Iron Railway (SIR) went out of business in 1846, the Wimbledon and Croydon Railway (W&CR) took over the route and opened the station on 22 October 1855. The route was then operated as a conventional railway, until it was closed by Railtrack after the last train on 31 May 1997, for conversion to tram operation. Station Court, on the north of the tram line and east of London Road A217 was originally used as a merchant's home.

Preceding station	Disused railways	Following station
Morden Road	Connex South Central; West Croydon to Wimbledon Line	Mitcham Junction
