= Wimbledon station =

National rail, London Underground and tram station

Wimbledon
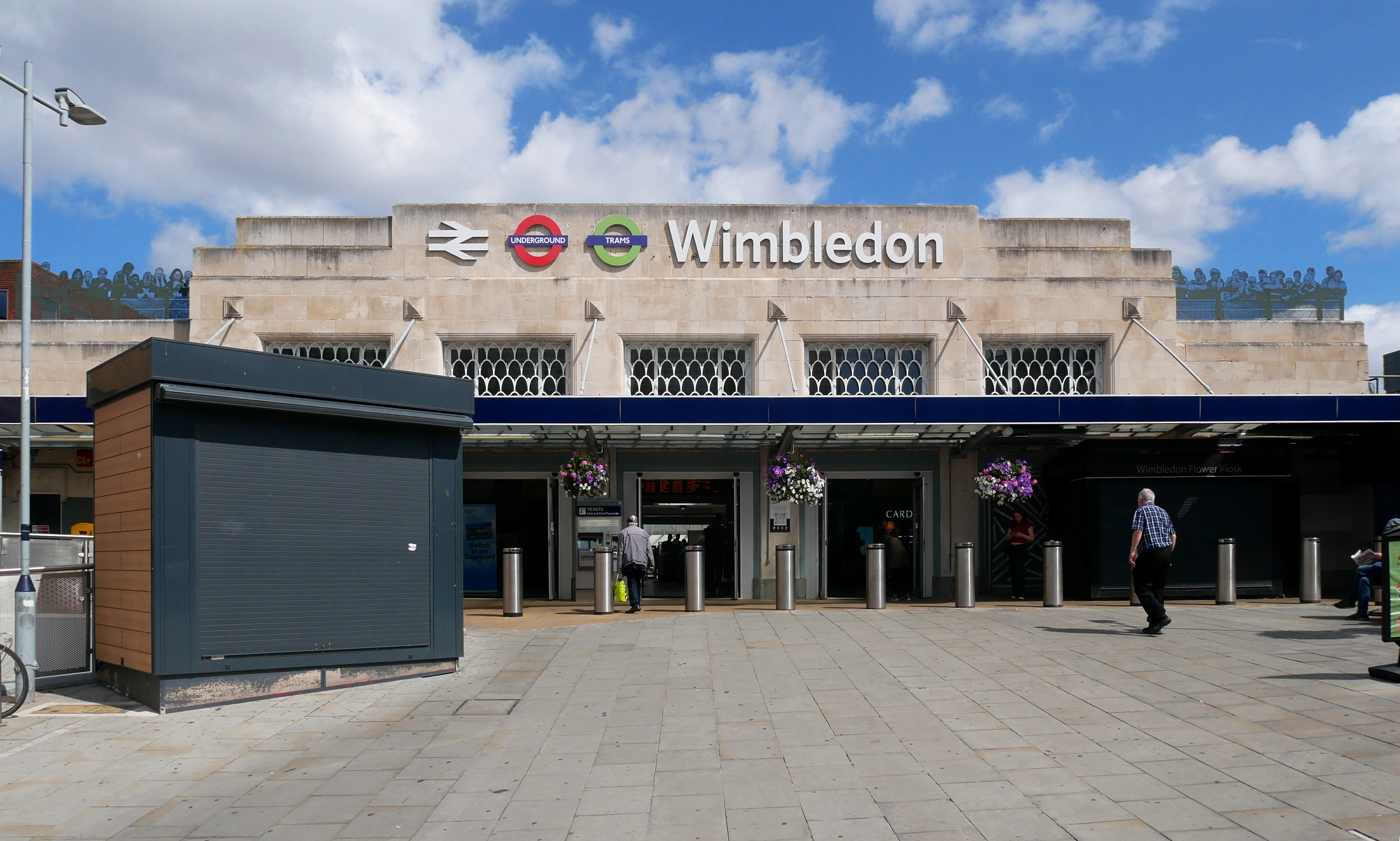
- Station entrance
- Interactive map of Wimbledon

General information
- Location: Wimbledon
- Local authority: London Borough of Merton
- Managed by: South Western Railway
- Station code: WIM
- DfT category: B
- Number of platforms: 11: (4 London Underground); (5 National Rail); (2 Tramlink)
- Fare zone: 3

London Underground annual entry and exit
- 2021: ▲7.06 million
- 2022: ▲11.52 million
- 2023: ▼11.22 million
- 2024: ▲16.67 million
- 2025: ▲16.90 million

National Rail annual entry and exit
- 2021–22: ▲9.952 million
- Interchange: ▲0.652 million
- 2022–23: ▲11.694 million
- Interchange: ▲1.154 million
- 2023–24: ▲12.581 million
- Interchange: ▼1.065 million
- 2024–25: ▲13.244 million
- Interchange: ▼0.917 million
- 2025–26: ▲13.842 million
- Interchange: ▲0.987 million

Key dates
- 21 May 1838: Opened (Wimbledon and Merton) with opening of the L&SWR main line
- 22 October 1855: Opened (W&CR to Croydon)
- 1 October 1868: Opened (TM&WR to Tooting)
- 21 November 1881: Resited on the opposite side of Wimbledon Bridge
- 3 June 1889: Opened (L&SWR/District to Putney)
- 1 June 1909: Renamed (Wimbledon)
- 7 July 1929: Opened (SR to South Merton)
- 2 June 1997: Closed (Railtrack to West Croydon)
- 30 May 2000: Reopened (Tramlink to Croydon)

Other information
- External links: TfL station info page; Departures; Facilities
- Coordinates: 51.4232°N 0.2043°W

Wimbledon is an interchange station in the centre of Wimbledon for London Underground, London Trams and National Rail services, and is the only station in London that provides an interchange between the London Underground and Tramlink.

It serves as a junction for services from the Underground's District line, two National Rail operators (South Western Railway and Thameslink), and Tramlink services. The station is in London fare zone 3. It is 7 miles 19 chains (11.6 km) from London Waterloo on the South West Main Line.

The station has 11 platforms. Platforms 1–4 are for London Underground, platforms 5 and 8 are for inner suburban South Western Railway services, platform 9 is for Thameslink and platforms 10a and 10b are for Tramlink. Platforms 6 and 7 are adjacent to the fast tracks intended for express and outer suburban South Western Railway services, but most of these services only call at Wimbledon during the Wimbledon Tennis Championships or on Sundays for outer suburban services. Access to these platforms is via sliding gates through safety fencing installed in March 2014.

== History ==
The first railway station in Wimbledon was opened on 21 May 1838, when the London and South Western Railway (L&SWR) opened its line from its terminus at Nine Elms in Battersea to Woking. The original station was to the south of the current station on the opposite side of the Wimbledon Bridge.

On 22 October 1855, the Wimbledon and Croydon Railway (W&CR) opened the West Croydon to Wimbledon Line to West Croydon via Mitcham and on 1 October 1868 the Tooting, Merton and Wimbledon Railway (TM&WR) opened a line to Streatham via Tooting Junction (now just Tooting). They shared a detached platform slightly to the southwest of the main LSWR station, until the whole station was relocated to the northeast of Wimbledon Bridge for the opening of the District Railway.

=== The District line and Sutton loop ===
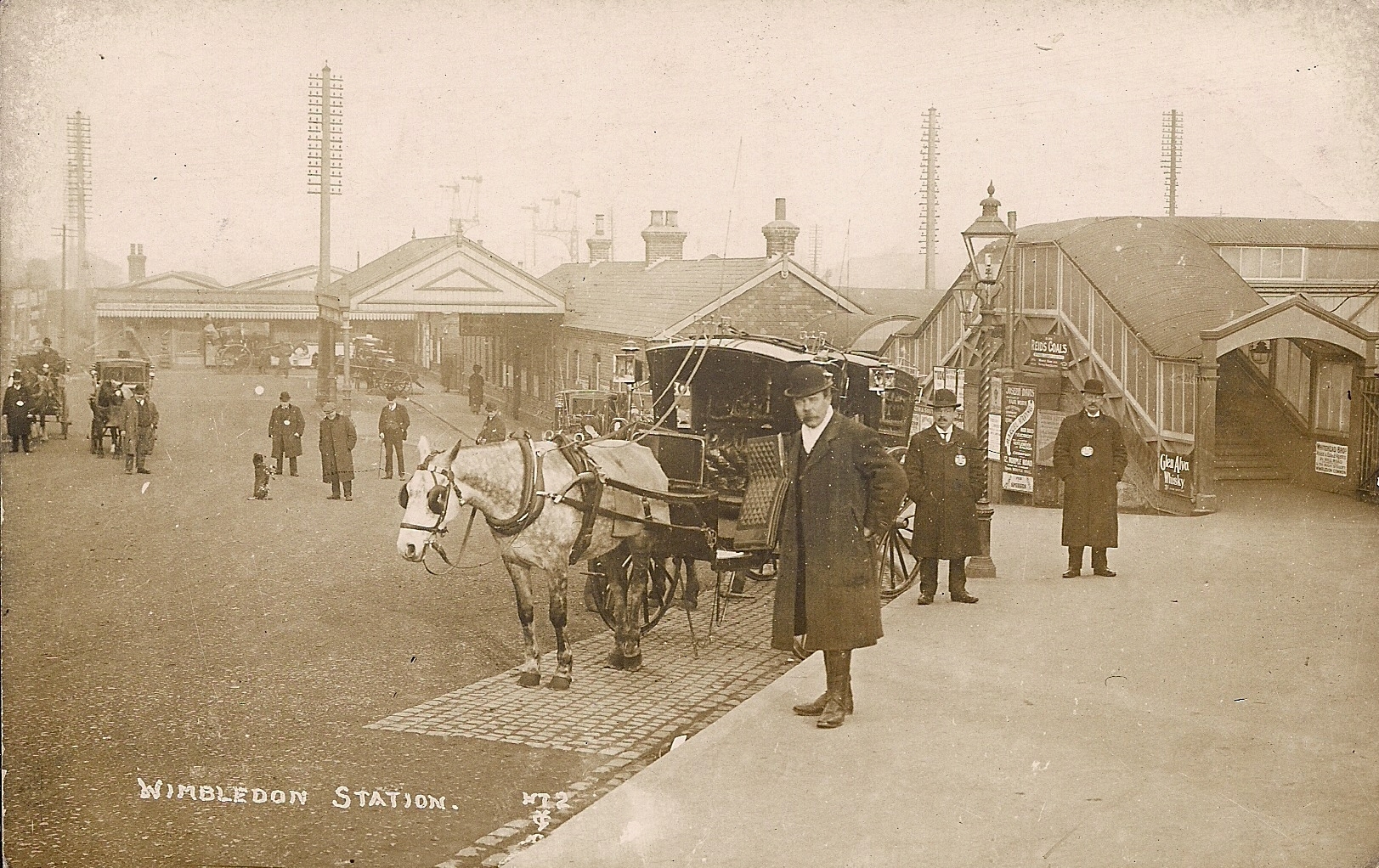
Wimbledon railway station in 1917

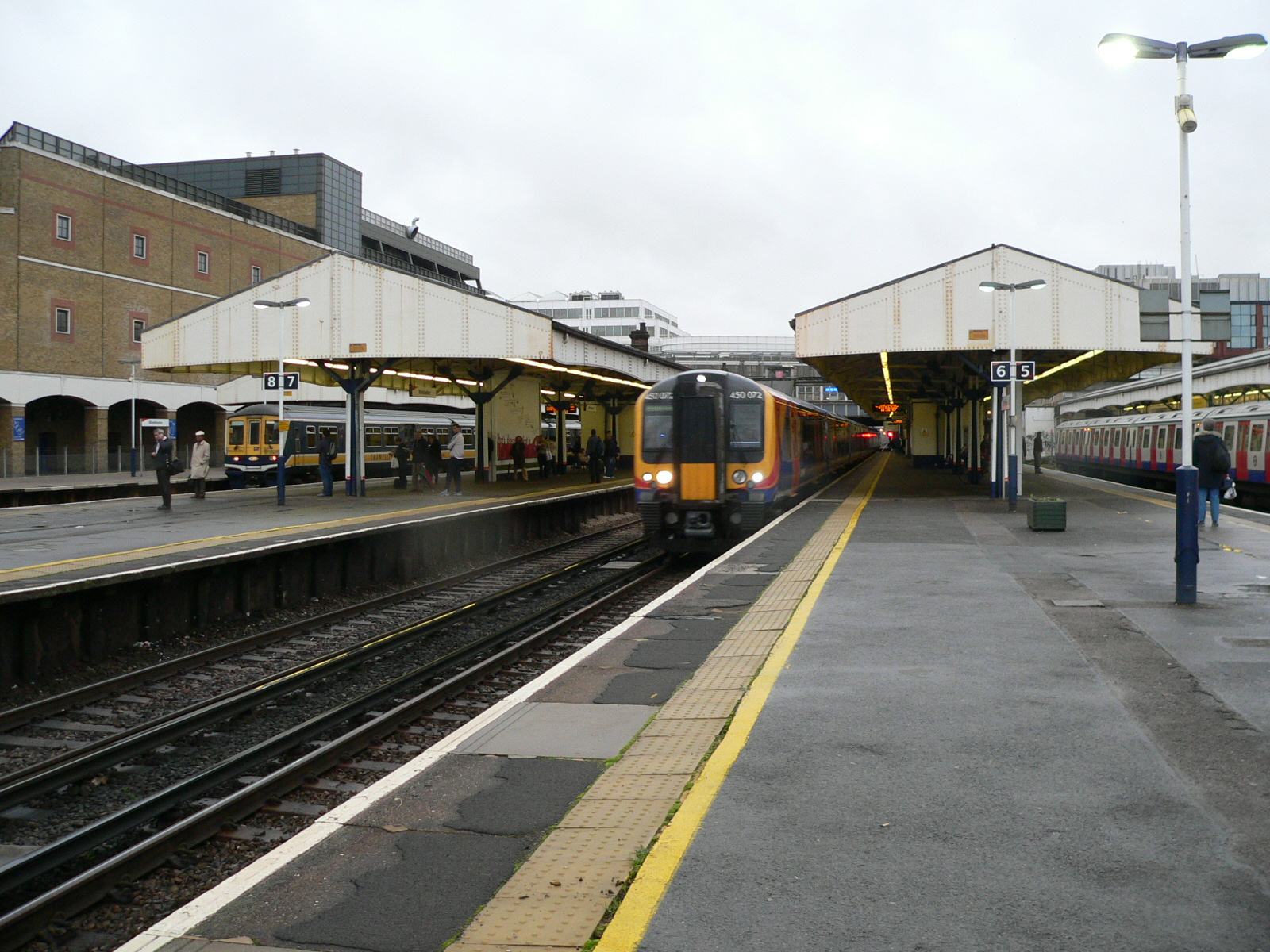
Wimbledon station platform in 2005

On 3 June 1889, the District Railway (DR, now London Underground's District line) opened the L&SWR-built extension of its line from Putney Bridge, making Wimbledon station the new terminus of that branch and providing Wimbledon with a direct connection to the developing London Underground system. The station was rebuilt on its current site for the opening of this service. District line steam-hauled services were replaced by electric services from 27 August 1905.

The station was rebuilt again with its current Portland stone entrance building by the Southern Railway (SR, the post grouping successor to the L&SWR) in the late 1920s as part of the SR's construction of the line to Sutton. Parliamentary approval for this line had been obtained by the Wimbledon and Sutton Railway (W&SR) in 1910, but work was delayed by World War I. From the W&SR's inception, the DR was a shareholder of the company and had rights to run trains over the line when built. In the 1920s, the London Electric Railway (LER, precursor of London Underground) planned, through its ownership of the DR, to use part of the route for an extension of the City and South London Railway (C&SLR, now the Northern line) to Sutton. The SR objected and an agreement was reached that enabled the C&SLR to extend as far as Morden in exchange for the LER giving up its rights over the W&SR route.

The SR subsequently built the line, one of the last to be built in the London area. It opened on 7 July 1929 to South Merton and to Sutton on 5 January 1930.

=== Tramlink ===
On 2 June 1997, the West Croydon to Wimbledon Line was closed by Railtrack for conversion to operation as part of the Tramlink tram operations. Platform 10, originally the down platform for the Wimbledon & Croydon and Wimbledon & Sutton lines, was used for the single track terminus of Tramlink and rail tracks and infrastructure were replaced with those for the tram system. The new service opened on 30 May 2000. The other end of Platform 10 became a terminating bay for trains from the Tooting direction. Platform 9, the W&C and W&S up platform, became a reversible platform for all Thameslink services between the Sutton and Tooting lines.

To increase the capacity of Tramlink services, a second platform was built in place of the former Thameslink bay. The service was suspended between Dundonald Road and Wimbledon from 13 July until November 2015 for the work to be carried out. The original tram platform was renumbered to '10a' with the new part called '10b', opening on 2 November 2015. As a result, tram frequency increased from 8 per hour to 12 per hour from April 2016.

=== Forecourt ===
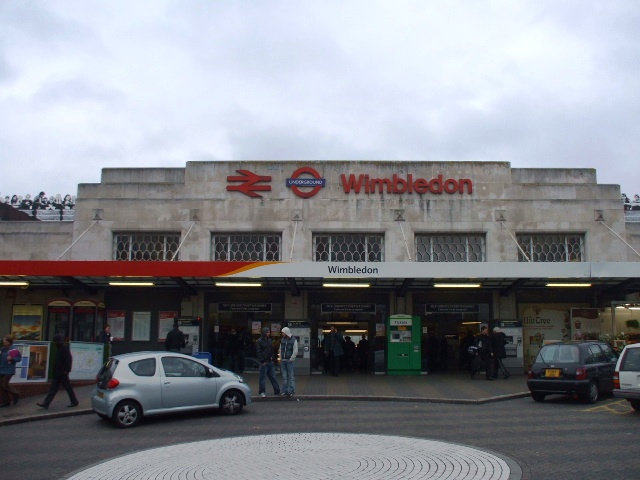
Wimbledon station approach in 2008, prior to the removal of vehicle access.

Before 14 March 2011, there was a roundabout outside the main entrance of the station to allow for vehicles to drop off passengers. This made the approach to the station somewhat cramped and not ideal during busy times. On 14 March 2011, vehicle access to the station's forecourt was permanently removed and the approach to the station was completely repaved. This made the much larger open space outside the station's entrance more ideal during busy times. These works were completed by June 2011 and the approach was hastily cleared in preparation for the Wimbledon Tennis Championships which would see a large increase in passengers passing through the station.

=== Laddie ===
Wimbledon station was also the haunt of a 'Railway Collection Dog'. Airedale Terrier "Laddie" was born in September 1948 and started work on Wimbledon Station in 1949, collecting donations on behalf of the Southern Railwaymen's Homes at Woking, via a box strapped to his back. He retired in 1956, having collected over £5,000 and spent the rest of his days with the residents at the Home. Upon his death, in 1960, he was stuffed and returned to Wimbledon station. He continued to collect for the Homes, in a glass case situated on Platforms 7/8, until 1990, when he retired once more and became part of the National Railway Collection.

== Accidents and incidents ==
- On 12 October 1972, a freight train ran into the rear of an electric multiple unit that was standing at platform 10. Twelve people were injured. The accident was due to inattentiveness by the driver of the freight train.
- On 6 November 2017, a passenger train formed of two Class 450 electric multiple units derailed near Wimbledon. Four people were injured and over 300 passengers were evacuated from the train.

== Services ==
=== National Rail ===
National Rail services at Wimbledon are operated by South Western Railway and Thameslink.

The typical off-peak service in trains per hour is:

- 14 tph to London Waterloo
- 2 tph to St Albans City via Herne Hill
- 2 tph to Sutton
- 2 tph to Chessington South
- 2 tph to Shepperton via Kingston
- 2 tph to Teddington via Kingston, returning to London Waterloo via Richmond
- 2 tph to Hampton Court
- 1 tph to Dorking via Epsom
- 3 tph to Guildford (1 of these runs via Epsom and 2 run via Cobham)
- 2 tph to Woking via Weybridge

Additional services call at the station during the peak hours. In addition, during the Wimbledon Tennis Championships, longer distance South Western Railway services often make additional calls at the station.

=== London Underground ===
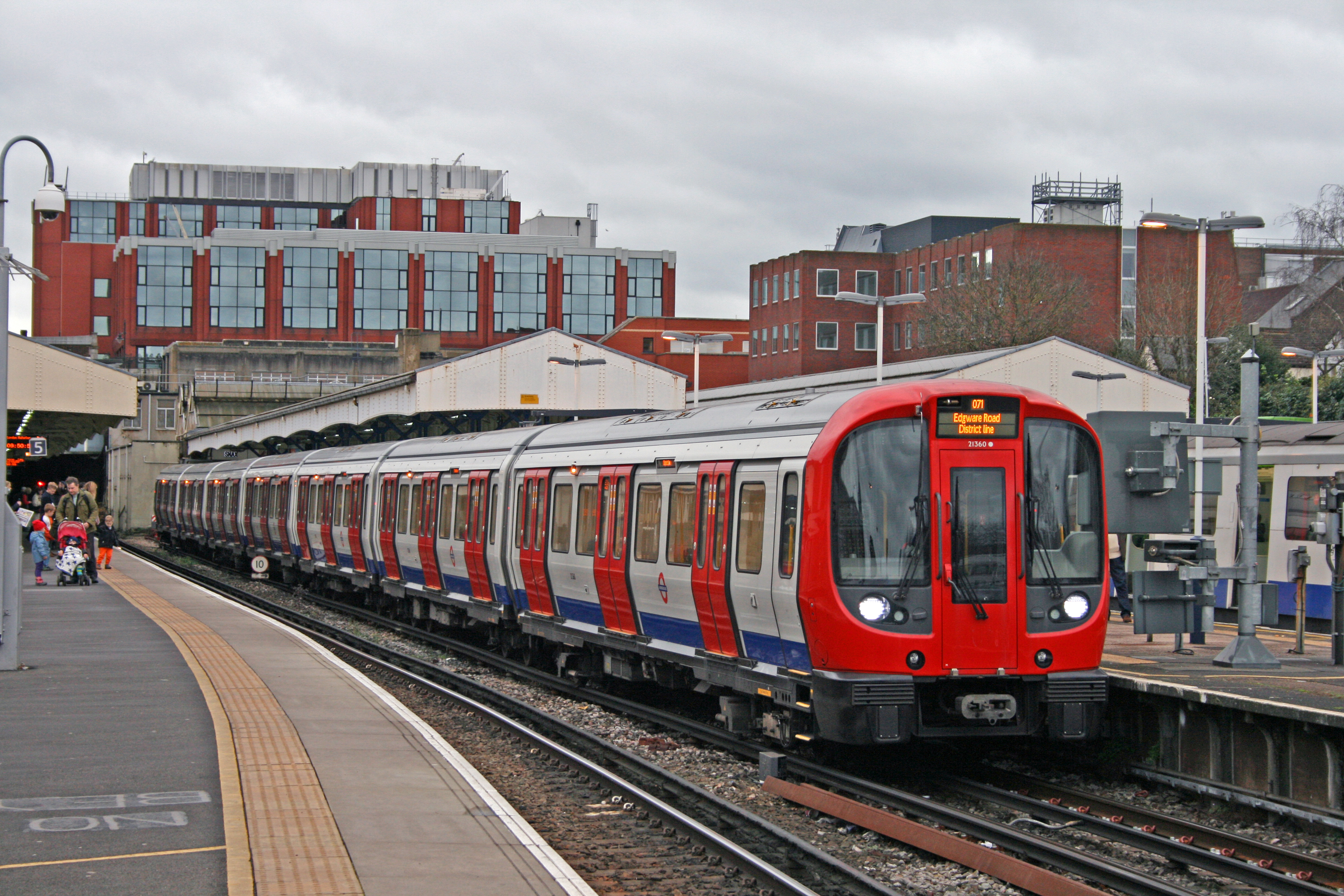
A train of London Underground S7 Stock at Wimbledon Station in 2014

The typical off-peak London Underground service on the District Line in trains per hour is:

- 6 tph to Tower Hill of which 3 continue to Barking
- 6 tph to Edgware Road

Additional services, including trains to and from Dagenham East and Upminster call at the station during the peak hours.

=== Tramlink ===
The typical off-peak Tramlink service in trams per hour is:

- 6 tph to Beckenham Junction
- 6 tph to Elmers End

A limited number of early morning and late evening trams to and from New Addington also run to and from Wimbledon.

Preceding station	National Rail	Following station
Earlsfield	South Western Railway South West Main Line	Raynes Park
Earlsfield	South Western Railway South West Main Line	Surbiton
Haydons Road	Thameslink Sutton Loop Line	Wimbledon Chase
Preceding station	London Underground	Following station
Terminus	District line	Wimbledon Park towards Upminster or Edgware Road
Preceding station	Tramlink	Following station
Terminus	Tramlink Wimbledon to Beckenham Junction	Dundonald Road towards Beckenham Junction
Terminus	Tramlink Wimbledon to Elmers End	Dundonald Road towards Elmers End
	Disused railways	
Terminus	Southern Railway Merton Branch	Merton Park
Terminus	Connex South Central West Croydon to Wimbledon Line	Merton Park
	Abandoned Plans	
Preceding station	London Underground	Following station
Elm Grove towards Sutton	District line Wimbledon and Sutton Railway	Wimbledon Park towards Barking or Edgware Road

== Future ==
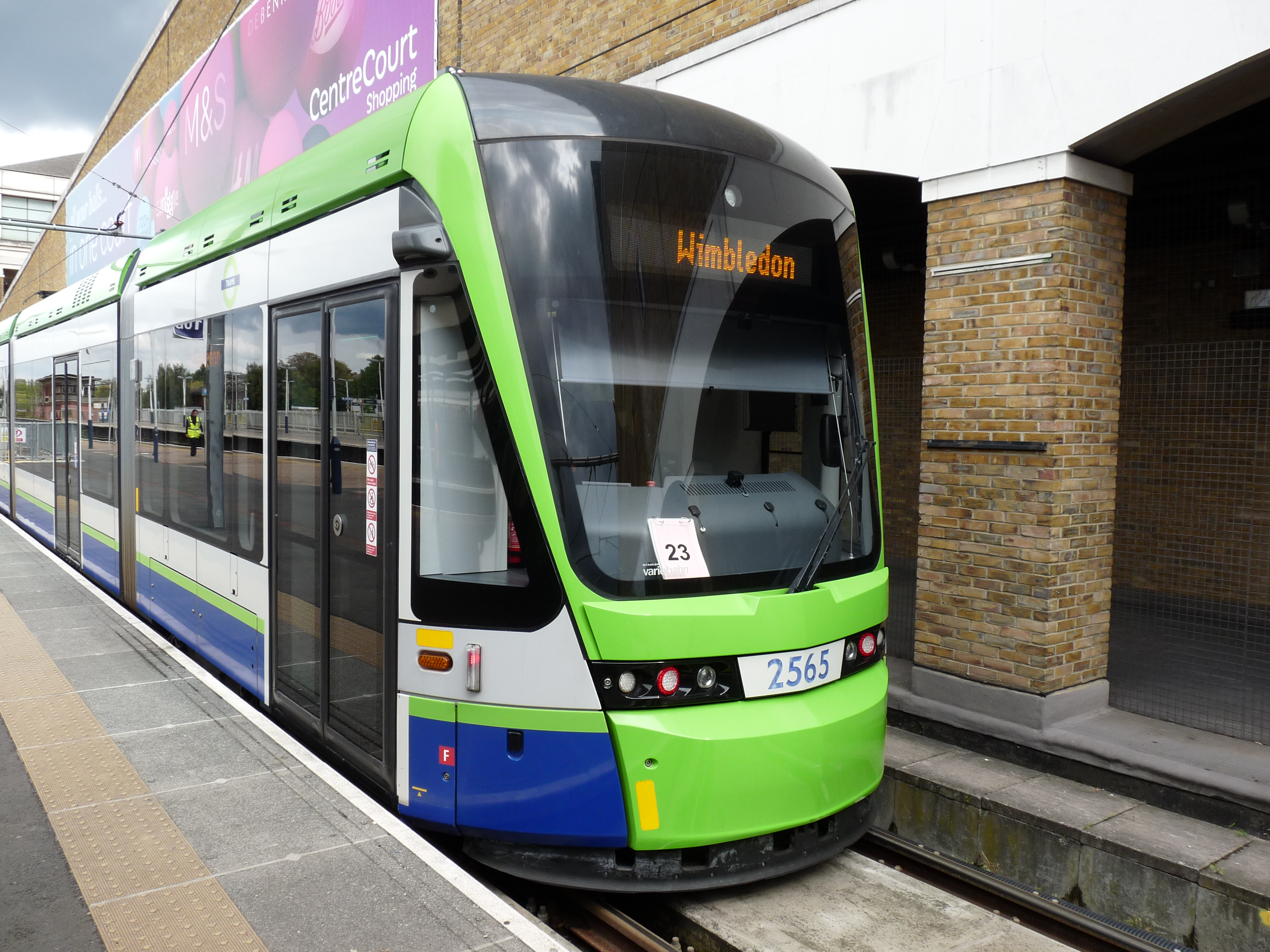
A Variobahn Tram at Wimbledon Station

If Crossrail 2 is built, new tunnels will be dug between Wimbledon and Raynes Park, calling at Wimbledon in tunnel and routing trains via Chelsea and central London to Hackney and beyond to either Alexandra Palace (in tunnel the whole way) or Hertford East (surfacing before Tottenham Hale, taking over the West Anglia Main Line north of there). This would provide another set of transport links for the area and direct services to Euston and King's Cross St Pancras.

There is also a proposal for an extension of the Tramlink services running from Wimbledon to Sutton via Morden, St Helier and Rose Hill.

== Connections ==
- London Buses routes 57, 93, 131, 156, 163, 164, 200, 219 and 493 and night route N87 serve the station.
- During the annual Wimbledon Championships there is a dedicated bus service between Wimbledon station and the Lawn Tennis grounds in Church Road.

== See also ==
- Wimbledon TMD – located a little to the north of the station, on the west side of the main line tracks.
