= Morden Road railway station =

Former railway station in England

Coordinates: 51.408843°N 0.192904°W

Morden Road
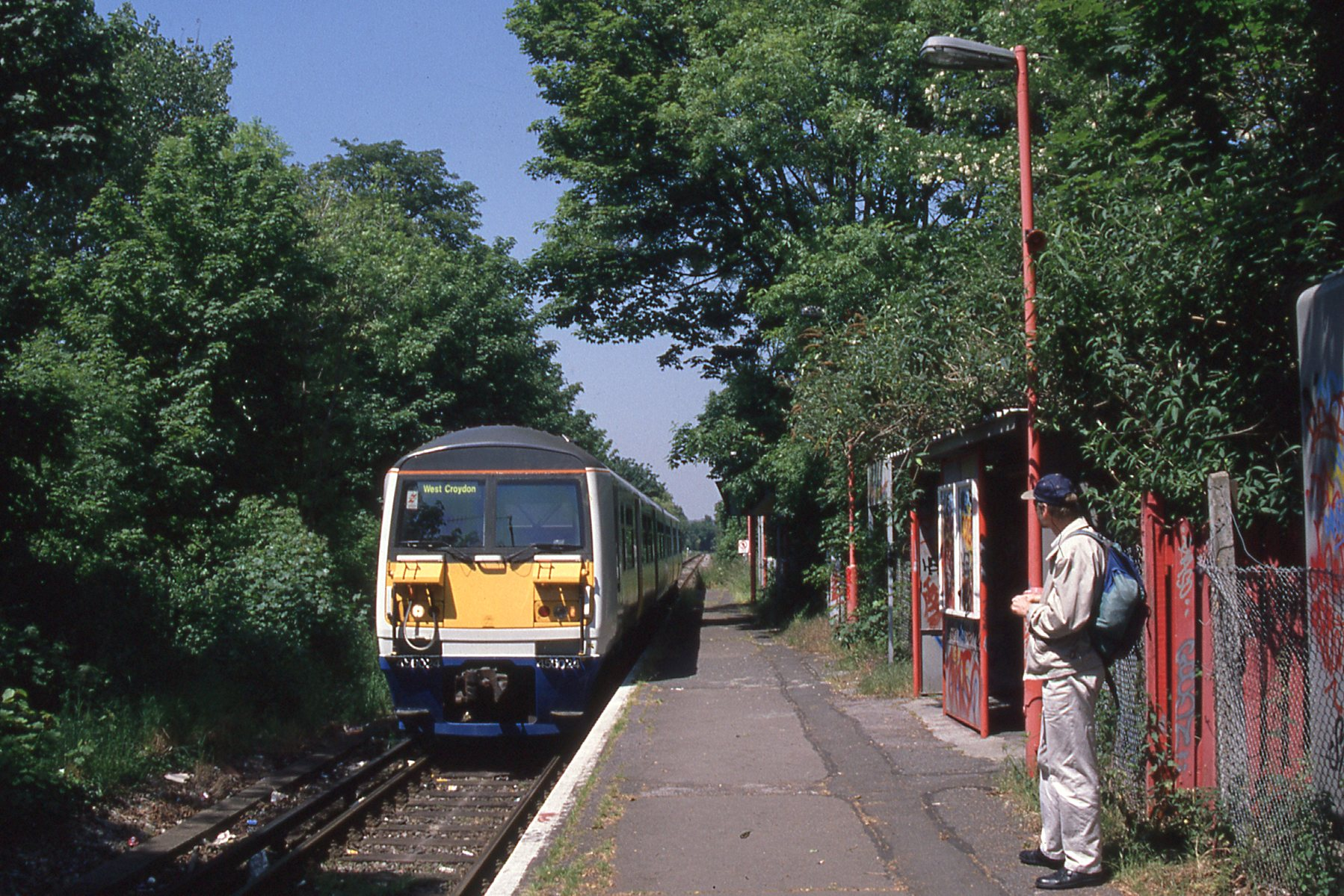
- The station in 1997.
- Interactive map of Morden Road

General information
- Location: Merton Park
- Local authority: Merton
- Owner: Wimbledon and Croydon Railway
- Number of platforms: 1

Key dates
- 1855 or 1857: Opened
- 2 June 1997: Closed
- Replaced by: Morden Road tram stop

Other information

Morden Road railway station was a station in Merton, on the West Croydon to Wimbledon Line.

== History ==
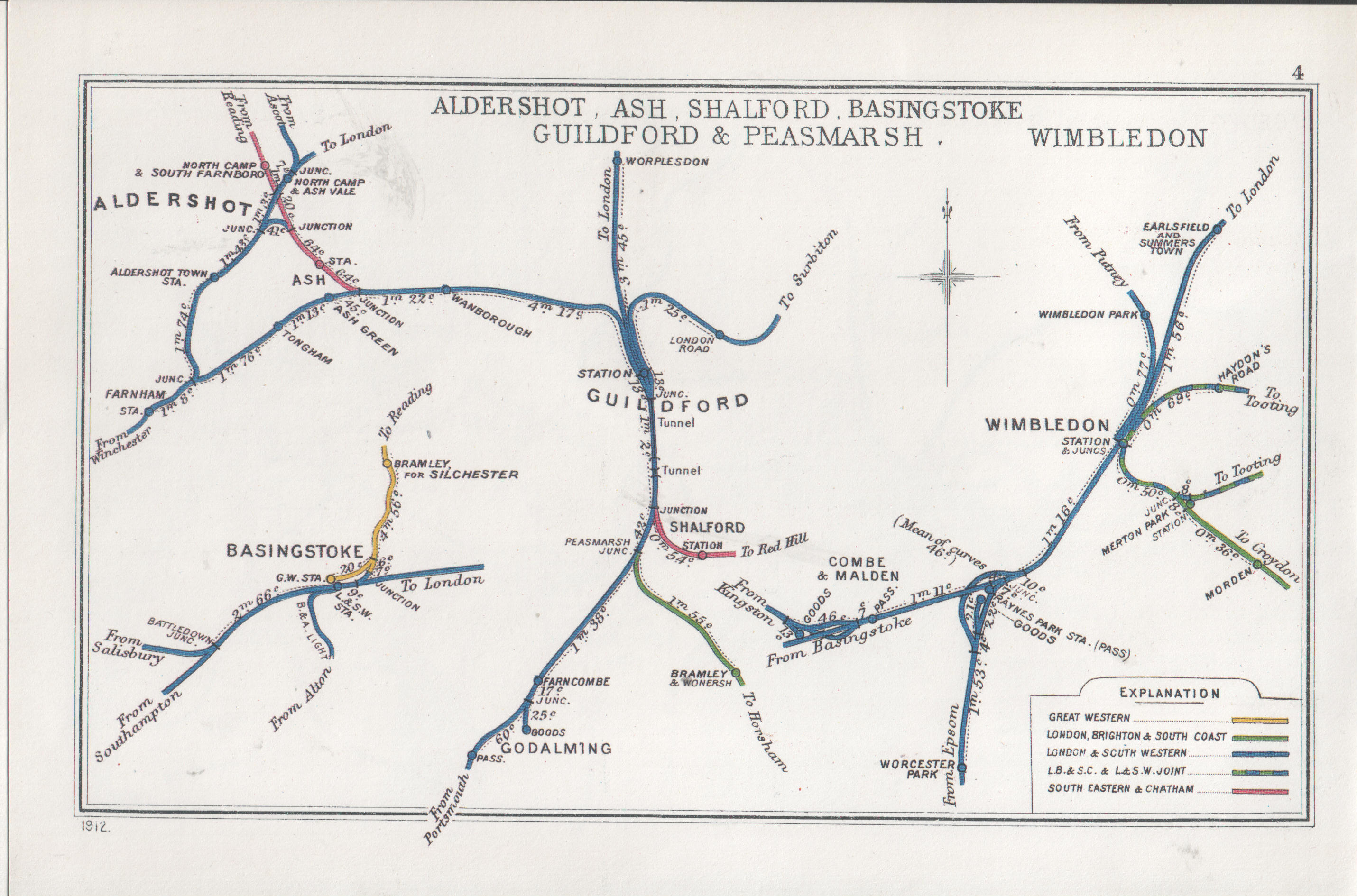
A 1912 Railway Clearing House map of lines around Morden Road railway station

The West Croydon to Wimbledon Line was opened on 22 October 1855, and the station opened on the same day or 1857, originally being named Morden. It was renamed three times: to Morden Halt in 1910; to Morden Road Halt on 2 July 1951, and finally to Morden Road on 5 May 1969. The last train ran on 31 May 1997 when the line was closed. Shortly after closure the original platform was demolished and the two-platform Morden Road tram stop of the Tramlink system was built on the site.

Preceding station	Disused railways	Following station
Merton Park	Connex South Central; West Croydon to Wimbledon Line	Mitcham

== See also ==
- List of closed railway stations in London
