= Mitcham station =

Mitcham station may refer to:

- Mitcham railway station (England), a former station in London
- Mitcham Eastfields railway station, London
- Mitcham Junction station, London
- Mitcham railway station, Adelaide, Australia
- Mitcham railway station, Melbourne, Australia
- Mitcham tram stop, London
