= Merton Park railway station =

Former railway station in England

Coordinates: 51°24′48″N 0°12′02″W

Merton Park
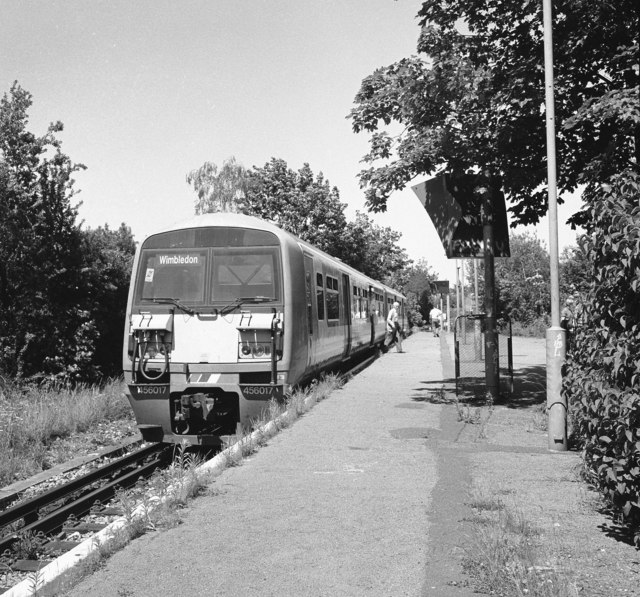
- The station just before closure in 1997.
- Interactive map of Merton Park

General information
- Location: Merton Park
- Local authority: Merton
- Owner: Tooting, Merton and Wimbledon Railway
- Number of platforms: 3

Key dates
- 1 October 1868: Opened
- 2 June 1997: Closed
- Replaced by: Merton Park tram stop

Other information

Merton Park railway station was a railway station in Merton Park, Surrey, served by both the West Croydon to Wimbledon Line and the Tooting, Merton and Wimbledon Railway. It was opened as Lower Merton railway station in 1868 but renamed as Merton Park in 1887.

the railway line and station was closed in 1997, Merton Park becoming a tram stop on the Wimbledon branch of the Tramlink network which replaced the railway.

== History ==
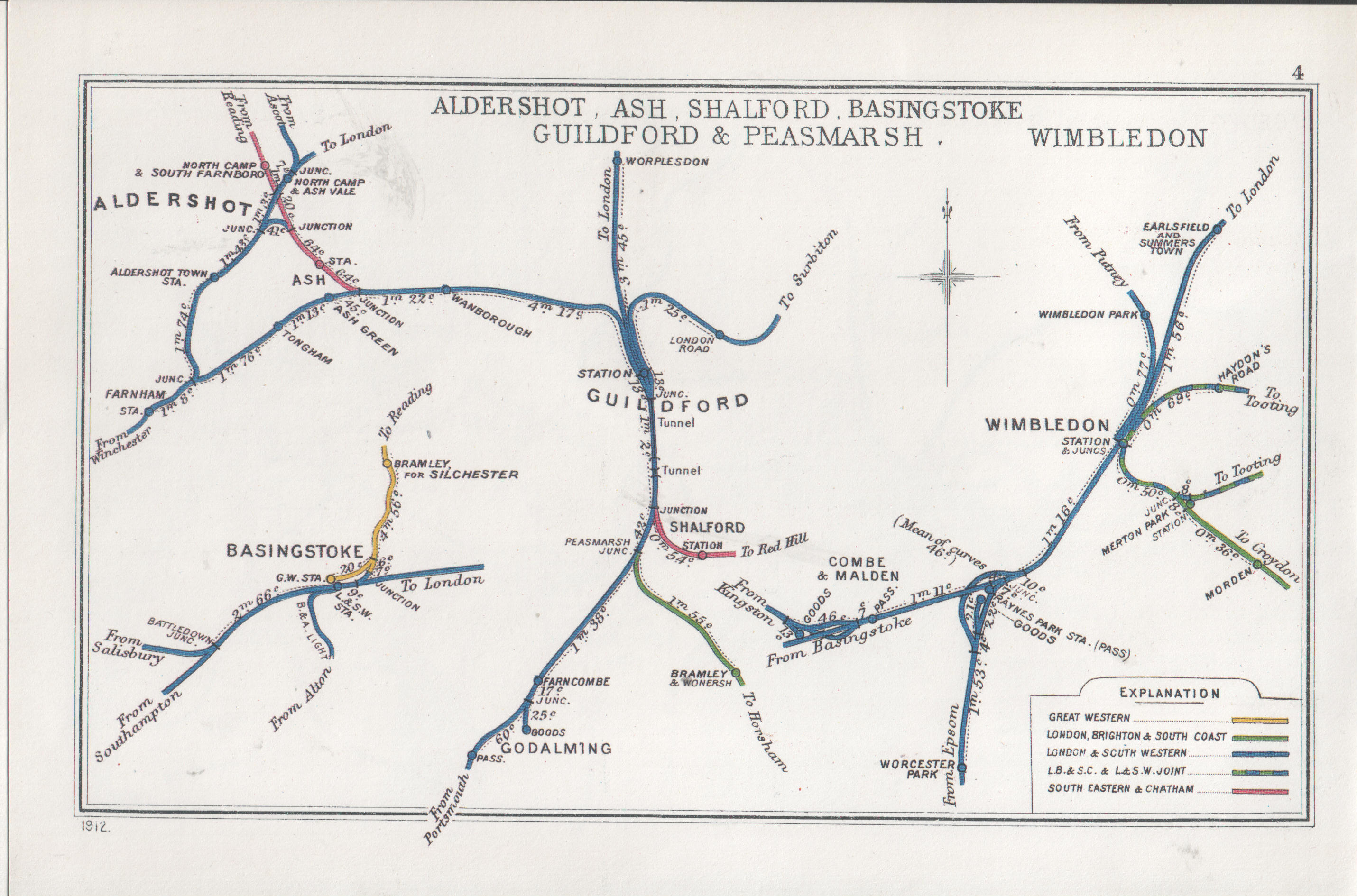
A 1912 Railway Clearing House map of lines around Merton Park station, including the Merton Branch

The station opened as part of the newly constructed Tooting, Merton and Wimbledon Railway on 1 October 1868 at the junction with the existing West Croydon to Wimbledon Line. Initially named 'Lower Merton', it was renamed 'Merton Park' on 1 September 1887.

Two platforms served the new line via Merton Abbey to Tooting Junction station, with a third entering service on 1 November 1870 to serve the single-track West Croydon to Wimbledon Line.

The Tooting platforms were suspended from use between 1 January 1917 and 27 August 1923, at first as a wartime cost-saving measure. The line was eventually closed permanently to passengers on 3 March 1929 but continued in use for freight services until 1975, after which the track was eventually lifted and most of the platforms fenced off. Limited passenger access was maintained, however, for it was necessary to cross both platforms and the intervening trackbed to reach platform 3 and the West Croydon to Wimbledon Line. The wooden walkway initially laid for this purpose across the trackbed was eventually replaced with a raised earth walkway.

Access to the station buildings was via the single entrance on Rutlish Road. A public footpath, running alongside the line from a (now demolished) signal box at the Kingston Road level crossing, provided an alternative route for pedestrians.

== Closure and Tramlink ==
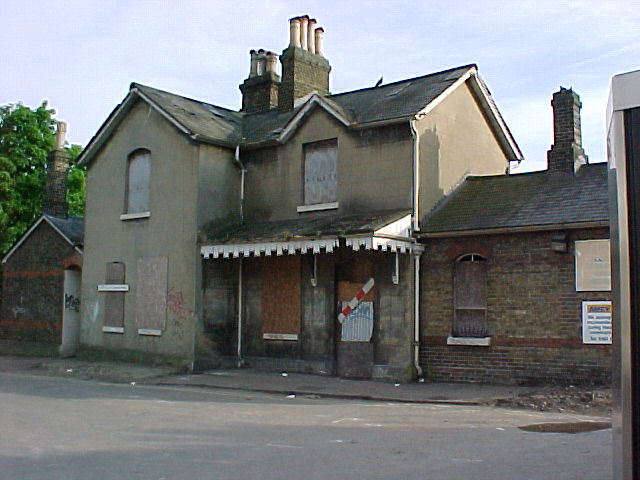
Merton Park railway station during construction of Tramlink and prior to restoration as private residence

Merton Park station continued to serve the West Croydon to Wimbledon Line until its withdrawal from service after the last train on 31 May 1997 and conversion into a stop on the Wimbledon branch of the Tramlink network. Merton Park tram stop now overlaps the site of the original station, the tram lines occupying the site of the trackbed and platform of the old West Croydon to Wimbledon Line.

The original station building has been converted into a private house, forming part of a small housing development covering some of the original station site.

Part of the nearby long public footbridge (crossing both lines to provide access to playing fields from Dorset Road) is now located at Corfe Castle station on the Swanage Railway, following its removal on closure of the West Croydon to Wimbledon Line.

Preceding station	Disused railways	Following station
Wimbledon	Southern Railway; Merton Branch	Merton Abbey
Wimbledon	Connex South Central; West Croydon to Wimbledon Line	Morden Road

== See also ==
- List of closed railway stations in London
