= Haydons Road railway station =

National Rail station in London, England

Haydons Road
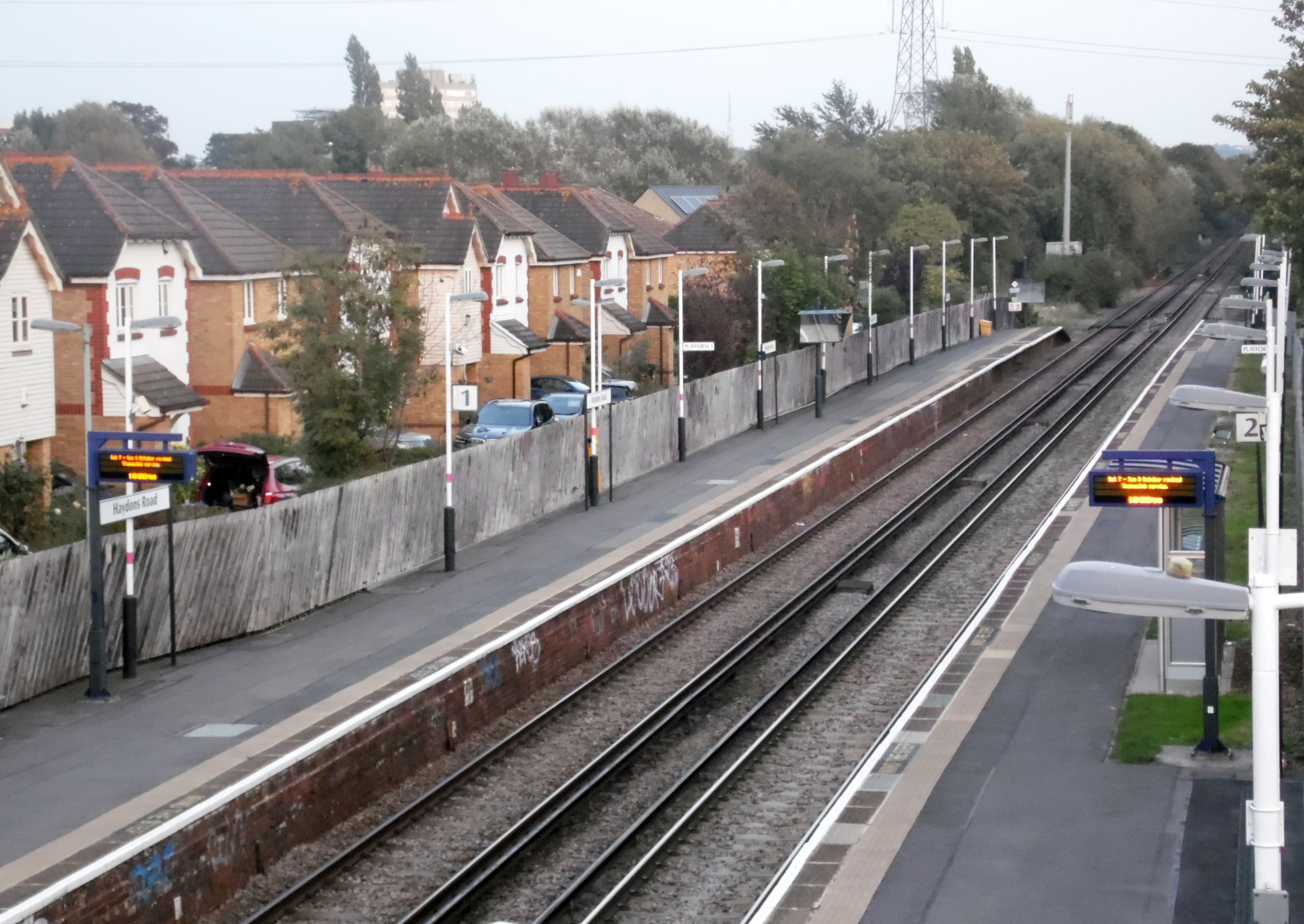
- Interactive map of Haydons Road

General information
- Location: Summerstown
- Local authority: London Borough of Merton
- Managed by: Thameslink
- Station code: HYR
- DfT category: E
- Number of platforms: 2
- Fare zone: 3

National Rail annual entry and exit
- 2021–22: ▲0.221 million
- 2022–23: ▲0.265 million
- 2023–24: ▲0.291 million
- 2024–25: ▲0.323 million
- 2025–26: ▲0.359 million

Key dates
- 1 October 1868: Opened (Haydens Lane)
- 1 October 1889: Renamed Haydons Road
- 1 January 1917: Closed
- 27 August 1923: Reopened

Other information
- External links: Departures; Facilities
- Coordinates: 51.4255°N 0.188°W

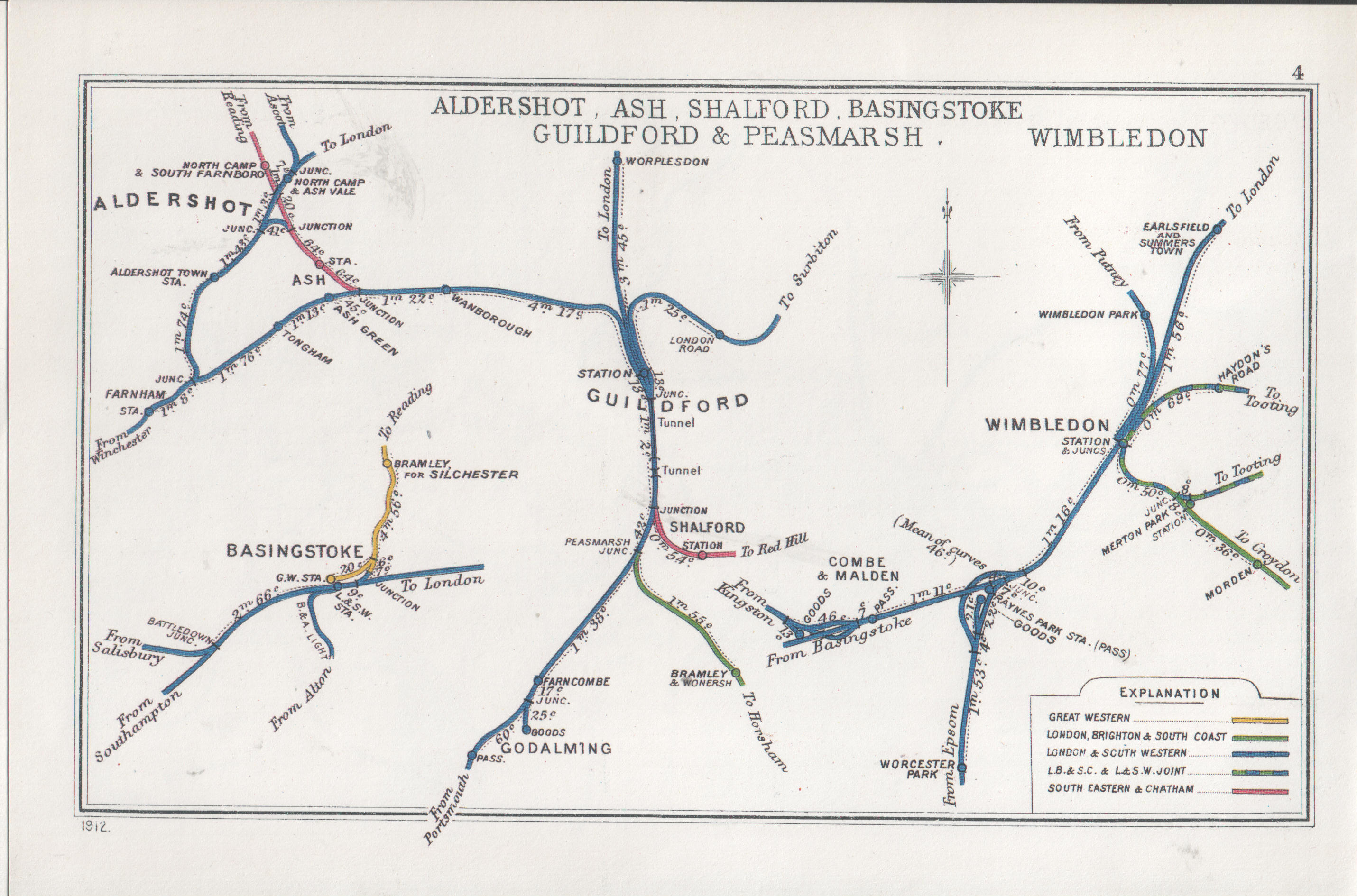
A 1912 Railway Clearing House map of lines around Haydons Road railway station.

Haydons Road railway station is in the north-east of the London Borough of Merton in South London. It is the nearest station to the Plough Lane stadium, the home ground of AFC Wimbledon.

The station is served by Thameslink trains on the Sutton Loop Line and is in London fare zone 3.

== History ==
It was opened, originally as Haydens Lane, by the Tooting, Merton and Wimbledon Railway (itself jointly owned by the London and South Western Railway and the London, Brighton and South Coast Railway) on 1 October 1868. The line through the station was electrifed by the southern railway on march 3rd 1929 as a part of its suburban electrification scheme, using 750V DC top contact third rail. The ticket office is on the down side of the station; the original station buildings were redeveloped by British Rail during 1991 and 1992 when land adjacent to the up platform was redeveloped for housing. Until the advent of Thameslink it was served by the London Bridge loop trains via Wimbledon.

== Services ==
All services at Haydons Road are operated by Thameslink using Class 700 EMUs.

The typical off-peak service in trains per hour is:

- 2 tph to St Albans City
- 2 tph to Sutton via Wimbledon

A small number of late evening services are extended beyond St Albans City to Bedford and daytime services on Sundays are extended to Luton.

Previously, peak time Southern services to London Bridge station was also run, but this was cut once the Class 455s were retired, those being the trains which previously ran the service.

Preceding station	National Rail	Following station
Tooting	Thameslink Sutton Loop Line	Wimbledon
	Historical railways	
Tooting Junction	Tooting, Merton and Wimbledon Railway 1868–94	Wimbledon

== Connections ==
London Buses route 200 serves the station, connection to 156, 493 and N87 at Plough Lane is within walking distance of the station.
