= Merton Abbey railway station =

Former railway station in England

Coordinates: 51.4141°N 0.1819°W

Merton Abbey
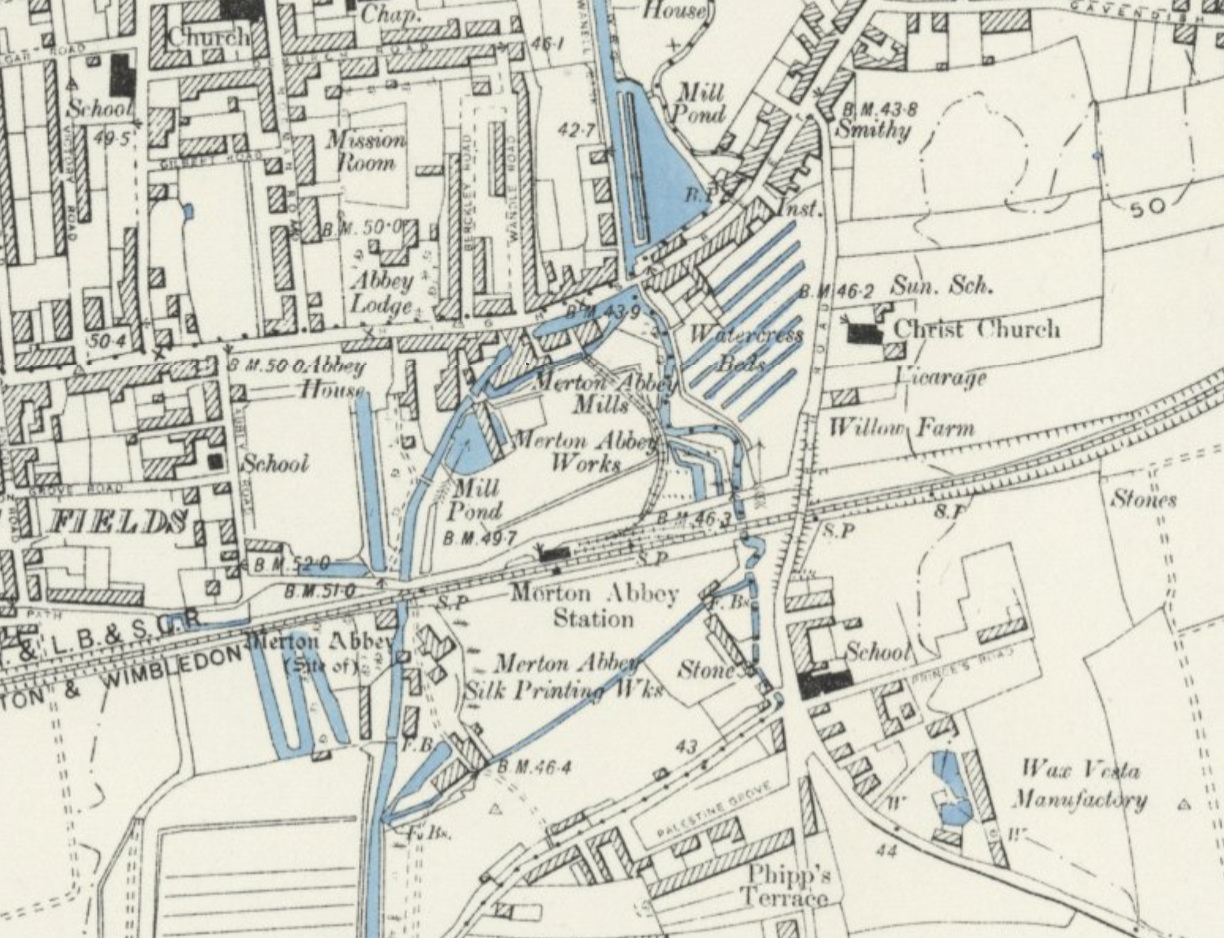
- Station on an 1895 Ordnance Survey map

- Location of Merton Abbey in Greater London
- Location: Merton
- Number of platforms: 2

Railway companies
- Original company: Tooting, Merton and Wimbledon Railway

Key dates
- 1868: Opened
- 1917: Closed
- 1923: Reopened
- 1929: Closed (passengers)
- 1972: Closed (goods)

Other information

Merton Abbey was a railway station in Merton on the Tooting, Merton and Wimbledon Railway. It was opened in 1868 and closed on 1 January 1917. It was reopened by the Southern Railway (SR) on 27 August 1923.

When the City & South London Railway (now part of the London Underground's Northern line) was extended from Clapham Common to Morden in 1926, it opened stations at Colliers Wood and South Wimbledon. The new Underground stations captured much of Merton Abbey station's traffic and led to its closure to passengers on 3 March 1929. The station remained open for goods services until 1 May 1972 and goods trains continued to run to a nearby private siding serving the Lines Brothers ("Tri-ang") toy factory until 1975. After closure of the passenger service, the junction at Tooting Junction was removed on 10 March 1934 and the up line from Merton Park on 3 November 1935.

The site of the station lies under a road, the Merantun Way. The only indication of its former existence is that the former station approach road is still called Station Road.

== See also ==
- List of closed railway stations in London

Preceding station	Disused railways	Following station
Merton Park	Southern Railway; Merton Branch	Tooting Junction
