= Tooting, Merton and Wimbledon Railway =

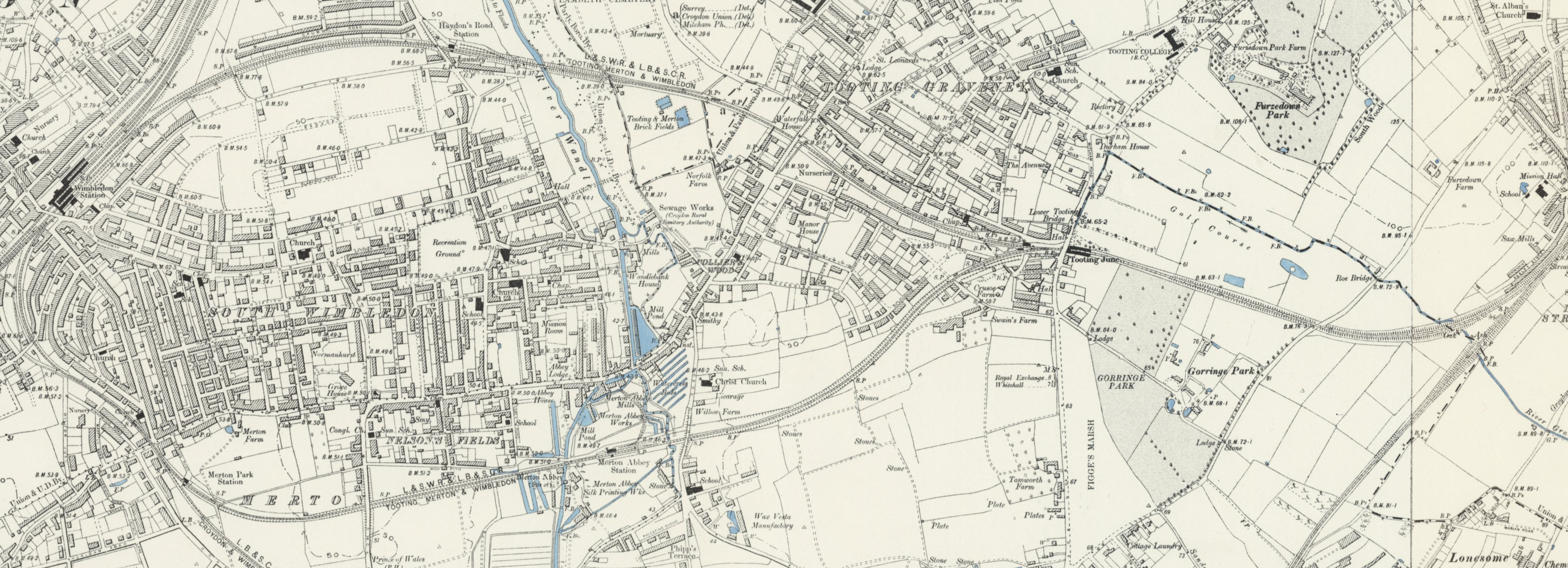
Tooting, Merton and Wimbledon Railway on an 1890s Ordnance Survey map, running between Wimbledon (left) and Streatham (right) with the Wimbledon and Merton branches meeting at Tooting

The Tooting, Merton and Wimbledon Railway (TM&WR) was a railway company jointly operated by the London and South Western Railway (LSWR) and the London, Brighton and South Coast Railway (LBSCR) in Surrey (now south-west London).

== Network ==
The TM&WR comprised two lines:

- the Wimbledon branch from the Portsmouth line at Streatham (Streatham South Junction) to the LSWR at Wimbledon. It had stations at Tooting Junction and Haydens Lane;
- the Merton branch from Tooting Junction to the LBSCR Wimbledon and Croydon Railway (WCR) at Lower Merton. with one intermediate station at Merton Abbey.

At Wimbledon the TM&WR shared the WCR station, a little to the southwest of the main LSWR station. On the arrival of the TM&WR the LBSCR facilities were expanded to two platforms, 5 and 6. Tooting Junction station was sited across the divergence of the Wimbledon and Merton branches, with a pair of platform faces for each. On opening Lower Merton station had platforms only on the Tooting line.

It was double track throughout, including the doubling of the WCR from Lower Merton to Wimbledon, which had previously been single.

== History ==
The Wandle Valley had long established industries that prompted the building of the Surrey Iron Railway, later developed into the WCR. The Merton Abbey copper mill and supporting trades were close to that corridor but not directly served by the WCR.

Tooting, Merton and Wimbledon Extension Railway Act 1864
- Act of Parliament
- Parliament of the United Kingdom
- Long title: An Act for making and maintaining "The Tooting, Merton, and Wimbledon Extension Railway;" and for other Purposes.
- Citation: 27 & 28 Vict. c. cccxxv

Dates
- Royal assent: 29 July 1864

Text of statute as originally enacted

Tooting, Merton, and Wimbledon Railway (South-western and Brighton) Act 1865
- Act of Parliament
- Parliament of the United Kingdom
- Long title: An Act for the Dissolution of the Tooting, Merton, and Wimbledon Railway Company, and for Testing their Undertaking, Railway, and Property in the London and South-western Railway Company and the London, Brighton, and South Coast Railway Company; and for authorizing the making and maintaining of a Junction Line of Railway at Wimbledon between the London and South-western Railway and the Tooting, Merton, and Wimbledon Railway; and for other Purposes.
- Citation: 28 & 29 Vict. c. cclxxiii

Dates
- Royal assent: 5 July 1865

Text of statute as originally enacted

In the 1860s the LBSCR was expanding its South London suburban network, and proposed the TM&WR to link their Peckham Rye to Sutton route with the LSWR, and attract goods traffic from the Merton Abbey industries. It was established as an independent company by the Tooting, Merton and Wimbledon Extension Railway Act 1864 (27 & 28 Vict. c. cccxxv), but vested jointly in the LSWR and LBSCR a year later by the Tooting, Merton, and Wimbledon Railway (South-western and Brighton) Act 1865 (28 & 29 Vict. c. cclxxiii). It opened on 1 October 1868, concurrently with the Peckham Rye-Sutton line. Initial LBSCR services ran from London Bridge both ways round the loop. After a year the LSWR began a service from Kingston to Ludgate Hill via Tooting, beginning a long association between the Wimbledon branch and the LCDR line to Blackfriars, a service that persists to this day.

In 1870 a platform was added to Lower Merton station for the Croydon line, and it was renamed Merton Park. In 1889 the LSWR relocated Wimbledon station to the other side of Wimbledon Bridge for the opening of the District Railway branch. The TM&WR and W&CR were then brought into the shared station with an island platform next to the South West Main Line, at roughly the location of what is now platforms 9 and 10. Also in 1889, Haydens Lane station was renamed Haydons Road.

In 1894 Tooting Junction was relocated to the other side of Mitcham Road, with just two platform faces for all services, although the original station building remained until the 1980s. By the early 20th century the LBSCR was running services from Wimbledon to London Bridge via both sides of the loop, and from Tooting to Victoria using the LSWR mainline between Wimbledon and Clapham Junction.

=== Interwar period ===
After the First World War, the TM&WR and connected LBSCR and LSWR lines were merged into the Southern Railway. The rapid expansion of electric trams in South London diverted passenger traffic away from these small suburban lines. LCC Tram No's 2, 4, 10 and 30 paralleled various sections of the TM&WR and WCR, and running on the streets they were more useful for local travel. In 1926 the City and South London Railway (C&SLR) extended their underground line to Morden, with stations at Colliers Wood and South Wimbledon, close to Merton Abbey and Merton Park stations respectively. The C&SLR provided a direct service to the City and West End (via the Charing Cross, Euston and Hampstead Railway), with stations more conveniently placed for commuters.

The TM&WR and WCR system was left only with passengers connecting to the mainlines, and goods traffic from Merton Abbey and Waddon Marsh. The Merton Abbey branch was closed to passenger traffic in 1929. As new works opened in the Merton Abbey area freight continued to be profitable, with coal inward and finished products out; private sidings were added to the branch to handle the traffic.

=== Decline ===
In 1934 the Merton Abbey branch was singled, the connection at Tooting was broken and the goods service operated via Merton Park only. After the Second World War several of the factories closed. The steady rise of road transport eroded what was left of the goods traffic. The nationalised railway could not support such an underused line, and the branch was closed completely and lifted in 1975.

The remaining Wimbledon branch kept its passenger service from Holborn Viaduct via Herne Hill and Tulse Hill, continuing the LBSCR practice. From 1930 it ran through to the Wimbledon and Sutton Railway (WSR) and thence to West Croydon. That service was not an outstanding success, and later the WSR service was diverted at Sutton to return to Streatham via Mitcham Junction, forming the Sutton Loop Line still operating today.

From the 1960s service frequencies were scaled back; by the 1980s the weekday off-peak service was 2tph each way, 1tph on Saturdays, and no Sunday service.

=== Redeployment ===
In the late 1980s the Sutton Loop was taken over by Thameslink. The unexpected popularity of this new cross-London service led to weekend services being restored and new longer trains being provided. For many years the Thameslink services were supplemented with some Southern services to London Bridge during weekday rush-hours, but these no longer run.

In the 1990s the Merton Abbey industrial area was re-developed as a retail park. Part of the Merton Park – Merton Abbey – Tooting Junction trackbed became Merantun Way, diverting the A24 trunk road to bypass Merton High Street. The site of Merton Abbey station is now occupied by a roundabout midway along Merantun Way and a petrol station.

In 1997 the WCR was converted to a grade-separated tram line (the Croydon Tramlink), and the site of Merton Park station is now occupied by a tram stop of the same name.
