= Tooting railway station =

Railway station in South London

Tooting
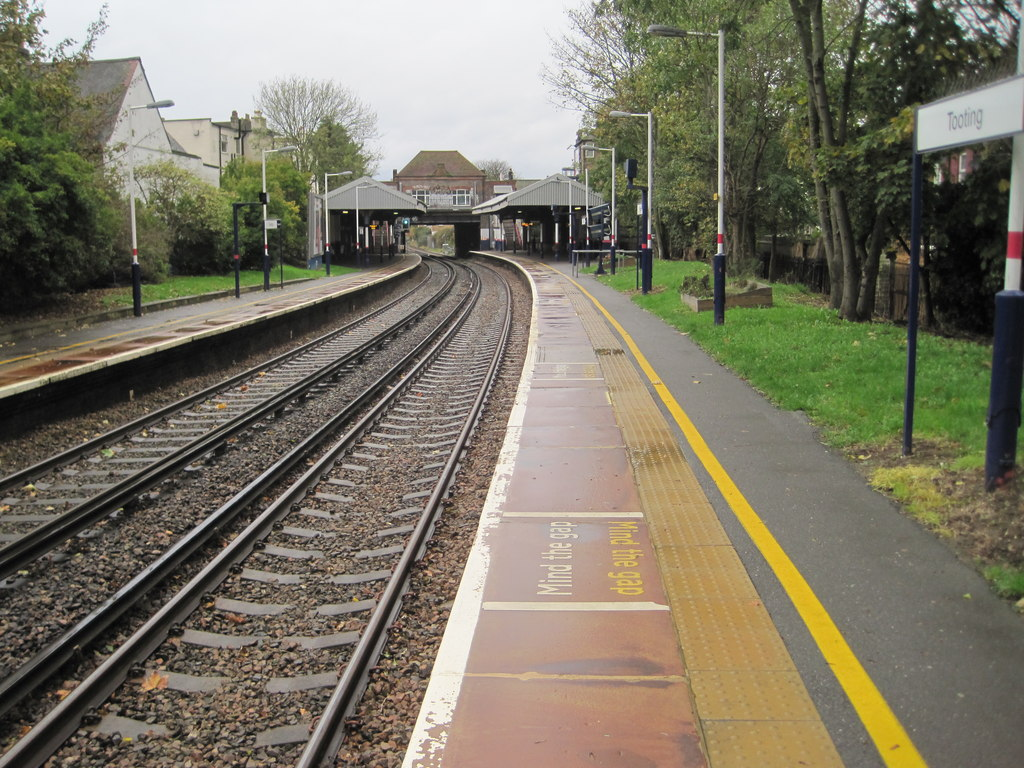
- Interactive map of Tooting

General information
- Location: Tooting
- Local authority: London Borough of Merton
- Managed by: Thameslink
- Station code: TOO
- DfT category: E
- Number of platforms: 2
- Fare zone: 3

National Rail annual entry and exit
- 2021–22: ▲0.631 million
- 2022–23: ▲0.703 million
- 2023–24: ▲0.747 million
- 2024–25: ▲0.804 million
- 2025–26: ▲0.889 million

Key dates
- 12 August 1894: Opened as resited Tooting Junction
- 1 January 1917: Temporarily closed
- 27 August 1923: Reopened
- 1 March 1938: Renamed Tooting

Other information
- External links: Departures; Facilities
- Coordinates: 51.4196°N 0.1603°W

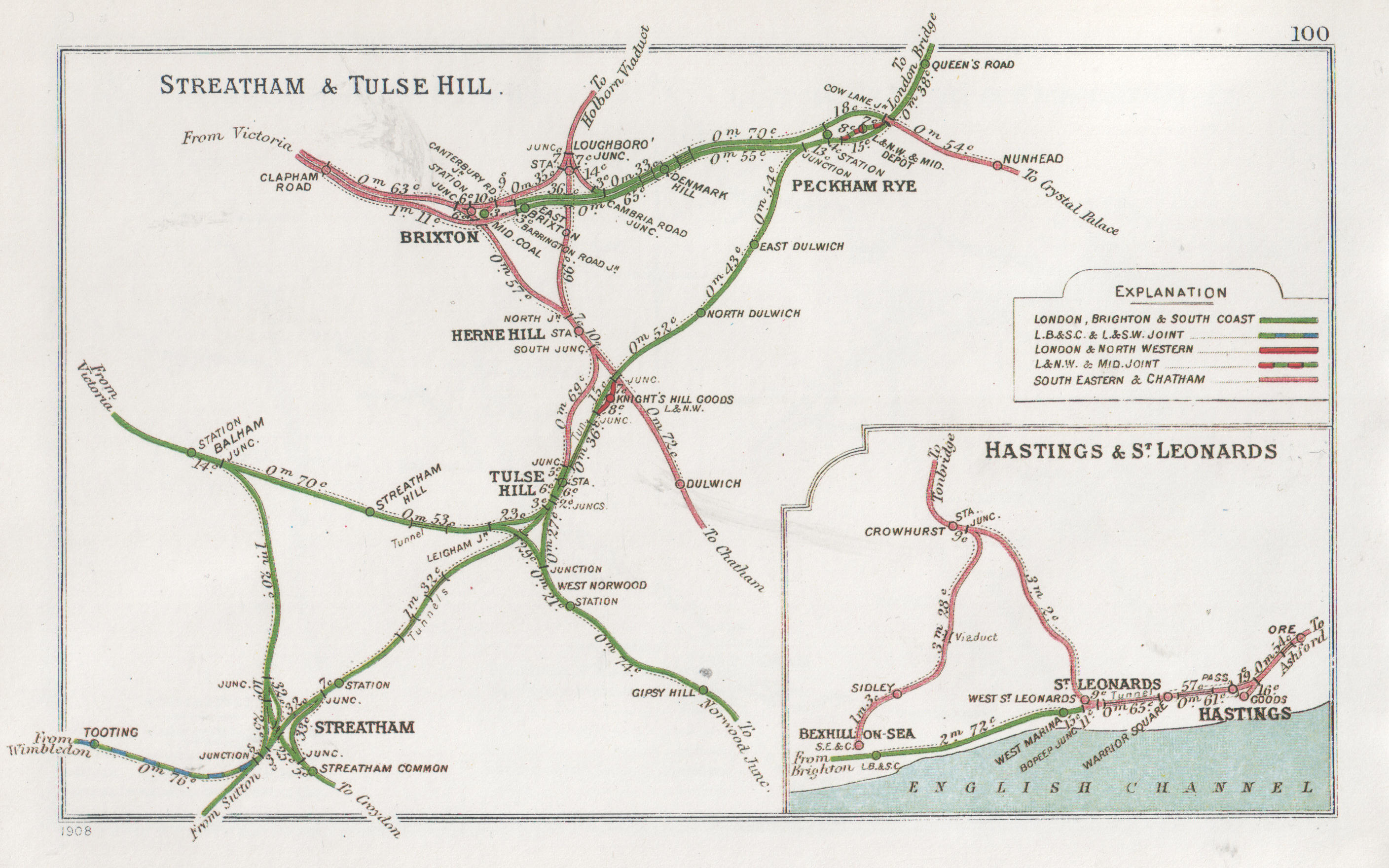
A 1908 Railway Clearing House map of lines around Tooting station.

Tooting is a railway station serving Tooting in South London; it is within London fare zone 3. The station is located in the London Borough of Merton but fronts onto the London Borough of Wandsworth where Tooting is actually located. The station is served by Thameslink trains on the Sutton Loop Line.

== History ==
The station opened in 1894 as Tooting Junction, replacing an earlier station of the same name, which was located a few hundred yards west and had opened in 1868. It was renamed Tooting in 1938, following the closure of the branch line from Tooting to Merton Park to passenger traffic in 1929.

Prior to the introduction of Thameslink services it was served by the London Bridge loop trains via Wimbledon.

Work to build a footbridge with lifts, enabling step-free access, began in 2023. It was completed in February 2025.

== Services ==
All services at Tooting are operated by Thameslink using Class 700 EMUs.

The typical off-peak service in trains per hour is:

- 2 tph to St Albans City
- 2 tph to Sutton via Wimbledon

A small number of late evening services are extended beyond St Albans City to Bedford and daytime services on Sundays are extended to Luton.

Preceding station	National Rail	Following station
Streatham	Thameslink Sutton Loop Line	Haydons Road

== Connections ==
London Buses routes 44, 77, 264, 270, 280 and 355 and night route N44 serve the station.
