= Tooting Junction railway station (1868–1894) =

Former railway station in England

Coordinates: 51°25′12″N 0°09′50″W

Tooting Junction
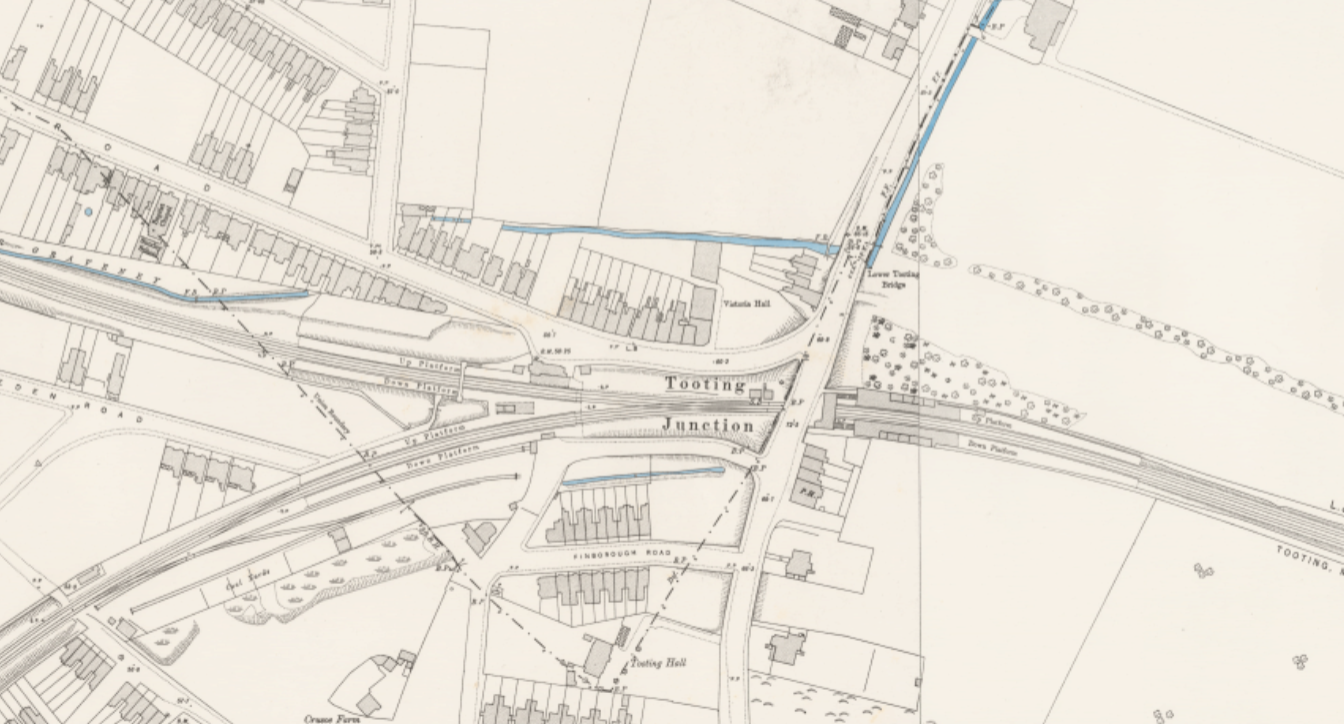
- Both the original and the replacement stations on an 1895 Ordnance Survey map

- Location of Tooting Junction in Greater London
- Location: Tooting
- Number of platforms: 4

Railway companies
- Original company: Tooting, Merton and Wimbledon Railway

Key dates
- 1868: Opened
- 1894: Closed
- Replaced by: Tooting

Other information

Tooting Junction was a railway station in Tooting, south London, serving both the Wimbledon and the Merton branches of the Tooting, Merton and Wimbledon Railway.

== History ==
The station was opened in 1868 but in 1894, to better handle the volume of traffic, it was re-sited slightly east. This is the present-day Tooting railway station, which was renamed from Tooting Junction to Tooting in 1938. After the closure of the Merton branch to passengers in 1929 the junction was removed and freight traffic served the small goods yard until 1968.

After closure, the original 1868 station building survived as a private dwelling until it was demolished in 2004; new houses were built on the site. Fragments of the platforms remain, and the original footbridge is still used as a pedestrian bridge over the railway. The former goods yard and part of the trackbed towards Merton Abbey is now the site of a supermarket.

== See also ==
- List of closed railway stations in London

Preceding station	Disused railways	Following station
Streatham	Tooting, Merton and Wimbledon Railway; Wimbledon branch	Haydons Road
Streatham	Tooting, Merton and Wimbledon Railway; Merton branch	Merton Abbey
