= Surrey Iron Railway =

Horse-drawn plateway in Surrey (1802–1846)

Coordinates: 51°27′31″N 0°11′32″W

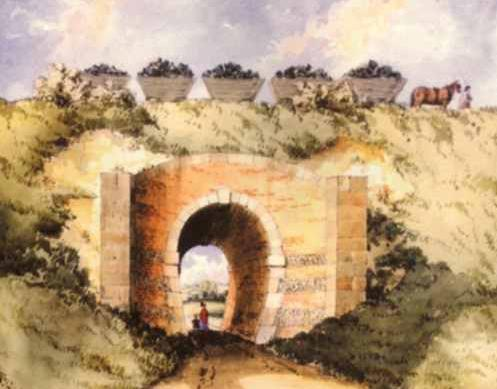
- Watercolour showing the Croydon, Merstham and Godstone Railway passing Chipstead Valley Road, Coulsdon, Surrey (George Buchanan Wollaston 1823)

Overview
- Headquarters: Wandsworth
- Locale: England
- Dates of operation: 1802–1846
- Successor: Wimbledon-West Croydon line

Technical
- Track gauge: 4 ft 2 in (1,270 mm)
- Length: 9 miles (14 km)

The Surrey Iron Railway (SIR) was a horse-drawn narrow-gauge plateway that linked Wandsworth and Croydon via Mitcham, all then in Surrey but now suburbs of south London, in England. It was established by an act of Parliament in 1801, and opened partly in 1802 and partly in 1803. It was a toll railway on which carriers used horse traction. The chief goods transported were coal, building materials, lime, manure, corn and seeds. The first 8 1/4 miles (13.3 km) to Croydon opened on 26 July 1803, with a branch line off from Mitcham to Hackbridge.

The 8 1/2 miles (13.7 km) long Croydon, Merstham and Godstone Railway was built as an extension of the railway but by a separate company. It opened in 1805 and closed in 1838.

The Surrey Iron Railway was commercially successful only briefly, until shortly after the opening of the canal between Croydon and London in 1809. It closed in 1846.

== Origins ==
By the end of the eighteenth century, a number of short plateways, such as those to the Caldon Low quarries and the Little Eaton Gangway, had been built. Their purpose was to convey a mineral to a nearby canal for onward transport.

The original plan for a transport connection between Wandsworth, on the River Thames, and the industries of the Wandle Valley had been a canal scheme, put forward in 1799, but doubts about the availability of water led to the adoption of a plateway. Contrary to popular belief, it was not the world's first railway authorised by Parliament independently of a canal: that was the Middleton Railway (1758). Nor was it the first public railway or the first railway company: both of those honours go to the Lake Lock Rail Road near Wakefield, Yorkshire.

Surrey Railways Act 1801
- Act of Parliament
- Parliament of the United Kingdom
- Long title: An act for making and maintaining a railway from the town of Wandsworth to the town of Croydon, with a collateral branch into the parish of Carshalton, and a navigable communication between the river Thames and the said railway at Wandsworth, all in the county of Surrey.
- Citation: 41 Geo. 3. (U.K.) c. xxxiii
- Territorial extent: United Kingdom

Dates
- Royal assent: 21 May 1801
- Commencement: 21 May 1801 (Note: The Acts of Parliament (Commencement) Act 1793.)
- Repealed: 3 August 1846
Other legislation
Repealed by	Surrey Iron Railway Act 1846

Status: Repealed

The Surrey Railways Act 1801 (41 Geo. 3. (U.K.) c. xxxiii) received royal assent on 21 May 1801, and work commenced immediately with William Jessop as engineer, George Leather as resident engineer, and joint contractor with Benjamin Outram. The line started at a wharf on the Thames at Wandsworth, and ascended gently through Tooting and Mitcham to Pitlake Mead in Croydon. There was a branch from near the site of the Mitcham Junction to oil-cake mills at Hackbridge, and a number of spurs to mills and works.

Surrey Iron Railway Act 1805
- Act of Parliament
- Parliament of the United Kingdom
- Long title: An Act to enable the Company of Proprietors of the Surrey Iron Railway to raise a further Sum of Money, for completing the said Railway, and the Works thereunto belonging.
- Citation: 45 Geo. 3. c. v
- Territorial extent: United Kingdom

Dates
- Royal assent: 12 March 1805
- Commencement: 12 March 1805
- Repealed: 3 August 1846
Other legislation
Repealed by	Surrey Iron Railway Act 1846

Status: Repealed

Text of statute as originally enacted

Surrey Iron Railway Act 1806
- Act of Parliament
- Parliament of the United Kingdom
- Long title: An Act for better enabling the Company of Proprietors of the Surrey Iron Railway, to complete the same.
- Citation: 46 Geo. 3. c. xciv
- Territorial extent: United Kingdom

Dates
- Royal assent: 3 July 1806
- Commencement: 3 July 1806
- Repealed: 3 August 1846
Other legislation
Repealed by	Surrey Iron Railway Act 1846

Status: Repealed

Text of statute as originally enacted

The initial share capital was £50,000 to which a further £10,000 was added in 1805–1806 having been authorised by the Surrey Iron Railway Act 1805 (45 Geo. 3. c. v). The final cost, including the dock at Wandsworth, was between £54,700 and £60,000. The main traffic was coal, building materials, lime, manure, corn and seeds. Horses were the motive power, and passengers were never contemplated.

Surrey Iron Railway Act 1846
- Act of Parliament
- Parliament of the United Kingdom
- Long title: An Act to enable the Surrey Iron Railway Company to sell the Lands, Houses, and other Property of the Company, together with the navigable Communication from the Dock of the Company to the River Thames at Wandsworth in the County of Surrey, and to dissolve the said Company.
- Citation: 9 & 10 Vict. c. cccxxxiii
- Territorial extent: United Kingdom

Dates
- Royal assent: 3 August 1846
- Commencement: 3 August 1846
Other legislation
Repeals/revokes	Surrey Railways Act 1801; Surrey Iron Railway Act 1805; Surrey Iron Railway Act 1806

Status: Current legislation

Text of statute as originally enacted

The railway was only briefly successful financially. It lost much traffic after the Croydon Canal opened in 1809, though the full effect was not felt until the canal acquired a rail link to the two railways in 1811. Later it suffered from the closure of the underground stone quarries at Merstham in the 1820s. It covered its costs, but was unable to update its technology or to keep the track in good repair. The Surrey Iron Railway Act 1846 (9 & 10 Vict. c. cccxxxiii) authorised its closure on 31 August 1846.

== Operation ==
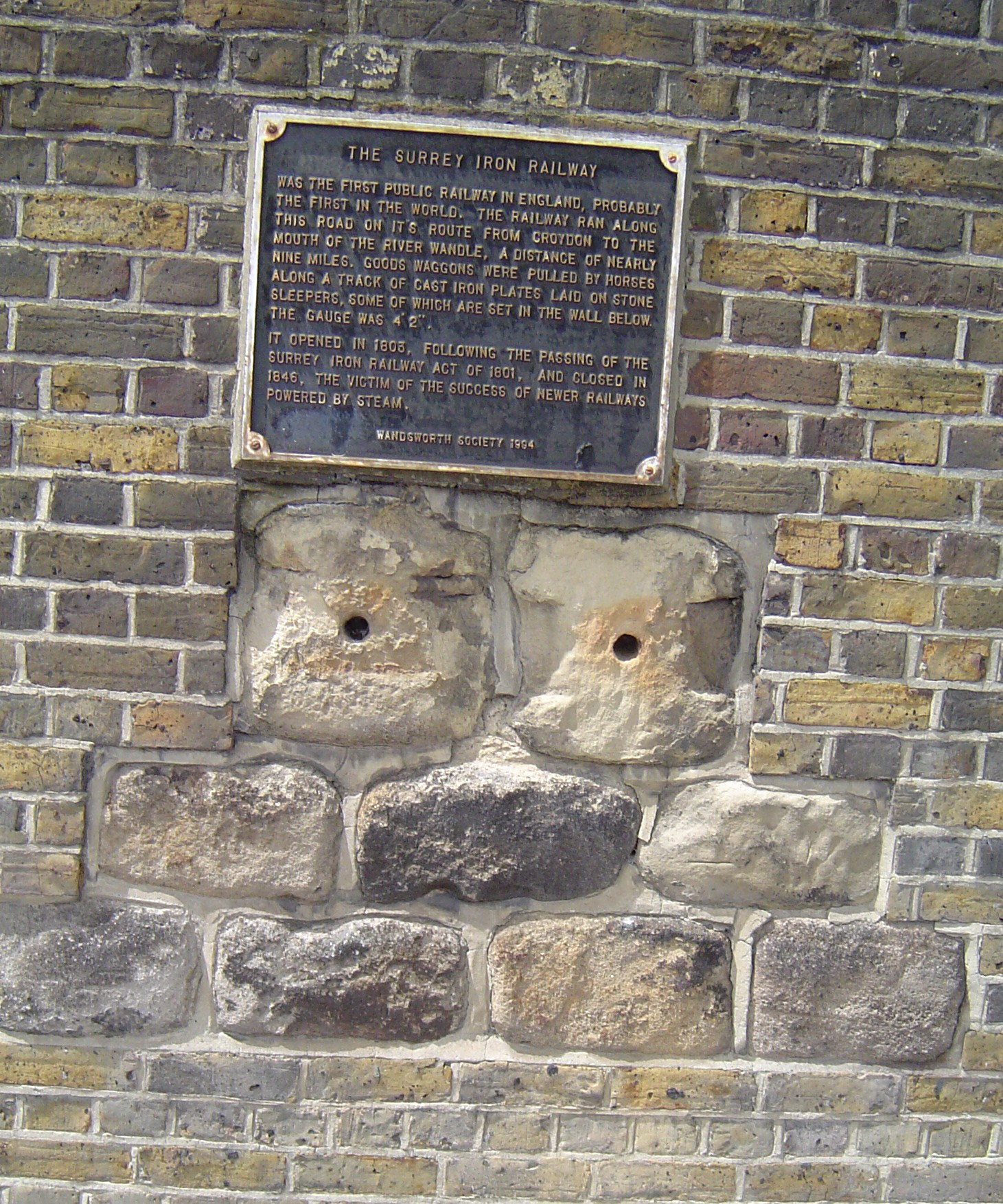
Plaque and some of the original stone sleepers of the Surrey Iron Railway that were set in the wall of Young's Brewery in Wandsworth until the wall's demolition in December 2014

It was a public toll railway, providing a track for independent goods hauliers to use their own horses and wagons. The company did not operate its own trains. Sometimes it leased out the track and the dock, and sometimes it collected tolls and kept the line in repair itself. From about 1836, James Lyon leased the tolls and could be hired to convey goods along the railway. There were toll or gate houses at Croydon, Wandsworth and Colliers Wood. According to the Mitcham Advertiser, the Colliers Wood gate house was still standing on 7 May 1956.

It was double-track plateway with a spacing of about five feet (1.5 m) between the centres of the stone blocks. The stone blocks were up to 16 inches (41 cm) square and 9 inches (23 cm) thick, with a hole for an octagonal oak plug, making them larger than Outram suggested. The gauge was recorded as 4 ft 2 in (1,270 mm), the same as on the Croydon, Merstham and Godstone Railway. (Note: Tharby and Lee measured the distance between the centres of the rails as 4 feet 6 inches (137 cm) on a preserved section found in situ at Quarry Dean Farm, Merstham in 1967. On a plateway, the gauge is taken as the dimension over the outer faces of the upstands. As the rails were 4 inches (10 cm) wide, the gauge was 4 feet 2 inches (127 cm) as widely stated. The standard gauge adopted by modern edge railways is 4 ft 8 1/2 in (1,435 mm))

The rails were of the Outram pattern 3 feet 2 inches (97 cm) long, 4 inches (10 cm) on the tread except for 5–6 inches (13–15 cm) at the ends where they were 1/2 inch (1.3 cm) thicker. A matching rectangular recess at the ends of each rail allowed the ends of two rails to be secured by a single iron nail or spike, hammered into the oak plug. The height of the vertical flange varied along its length from about 2 1/2 inches (6.4 cm) at the ends to about 3 inches (7.6 cm) in the middle. Breakages of the brittle cast iron led to modifications in the replacement rails. Some rails had a smaller downward flange or rib along the rail's trailing edge. Rails with a constant 1 inch (2.5 cm) flange were used at road crossings, as directed by the House of Lords. Farey states the crossing was made level using pavement stones. Simple points or switch plates consisting of a pivoted iron rail or bar allowed trains to pass from one track to another, connect branch lines and provide sidings at the wharves. At the Wandsworth wharf there were a pair of turnplates or turntables that allowed the wagons to be rotated through 90° so their load could be tipped into a waiting barge. This was facilitated by an overhanging pier or stage, which likely included a tipping frame.

== Route ==
Course of railways

The 9-mile (14.5 km) route followed the shallow valley of the River Wandle, then heavily industrialised with numerous factories and mills, from the River Thames at Wandsworth southwards to Croydon, at what is now Reeves Corner. A short branch ran from Mitcham to Hackbridge and Carshalton. The railway was extended by a separate company as the Croydon, Merstham and Godstone Railway through Purley and Coulsdon to quarries near Merstham, opened in 1805 and closed in 1838.

== Rolling stock ==
The railway users provided their own trucks and wagons, which were designed for the load they carried, but the railway company stipulated a maximum weight, width and length between axles. The maximum laden weight was 3¼ tons (3.3 tonnes), while the unladen wagons typically weighed about a ton(ne). According to Farey writing in 1806, the most common wagon was 7 feet 5 inches (2.26 m) long by 4 feet 5 inches (1.35 m) wide and 2 feet 4 inches (0.71 m) high. The owners were also obliged to register the wagons with the railway company and paint their name and wagon number in letters 3 inches (7.6 cm) tall in white on a black background. An artist's impression was printed on a 1939 cigarette card. The company, Were & Bush, were significant linseed oil manufacturers at Garratt Mill where today's Trewint Street crosses the river Wandle.

McGow believes they were the first known users of the Surrey Iron Railway in September 1802 when a newspaper reported three wagons carrying 33 quarters of linseed were pulled by a small horse. Malcolm writing around the same time as Farey describes a similar wagon that was designed to tip by placing the axles further forward, with the rear axle in the centre. Wollaston's 1823 watercolour depicts shorter, taller wagons used for conveying coal. Malcolm claims it was usual for three wagons to be drawn by a pair of horses, although Farey mentions one horse could pull several wagons and were generally large mules by the time the railway closed. The train travelled at the walking pace of the person who led the horses / mules and checked the track.

== History ==
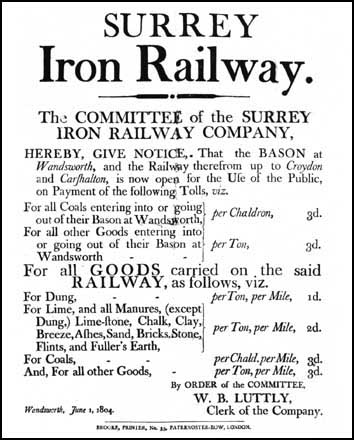
Notice of tolls, 1804.

The advent of faster and more powerful steam locomotives spelled the end for horse-drawn railways. In 1823, William James, a shareholder in the railway, tried to persuade George Stephenson to supply a locomotive. Stephenson realised that the cast-iron plateway could not support the weight of a locomotive and declined. A steam railway arrived in Croydon with the opening of the London and Croydon Railway in 1839.

In 1844 the proprietors sold the railway to the London and South Western Railway (L&SWR), which sold it to the London and Brighton Railway (L&BR) so that the L&BR could use the trackbed to extend from Croydon to Earlsfield and then join the L&SWR line into Nine Elms and eventually Waterloo. However, the sale did not proceed, and on 3 August 1846 the Surrey Iron Railway obtained an act of Parliament authorising its closure, the Surrey Iron Railway Act 1846 (9 & 10 Vict. c. cccxxxiii). The closure took place on 31 August 1846. Part of the route was used for part of the West Croydon to Wimbledon Line, part of the London, Brighton and South Coast Railway from 1856, and some of the route is in use by London Tramlink: routes 3 & 4 between Wandle Park & Waddon Marsh, and route 3 at Mitcham.

== Wharf and dock ==
The Wandsworth wharf ran alongside the newly cut basin or dock that extended from the Thames nearly as far as Wandsworth High Street and could accommodate 30 barges, varying in size from the west country barge to the smaller lighter and passage boat (ferry). It allowed the wagons to be loaded or unloaded into waiting barges for onward travel. The dock cut through The Causeway, (Note: causeway) which was spanned by a swing bridge. There was another swing (or lift) bridge at today's Armoury Way where a branch of the railway crossed the dock to Mr Shepley's (aka Shipley's) warehouse. A lock was required at the entrance of the tidal Thames, which had the advantage over a single tidal gate by allowing barges and other vessels to enter and leave the dock regardless of the tide. The dock was kept full at high tide, which varied from 3 feet 6 inches (1.07 m) at neap tide and 5 feet 6 inches (1.68 m) at spring tide. Bradshaw states the lock could accommodate vessels up to 77 feet (23 m) long and 17 feet (5.2 m) wide, which included Medway sailing barges. The wharf was equipped with warehouses, toll house, cranes and a weighing machine. The entrance to the wharf was protected by gates across today's Ram Street, at the junction with Barchard Street, which at the time was a continuation of Red Lion Street (Ram Street).

This was the first part of the "railway" to be constructed and was opened on 7 January 1802. It was managed by Samuel Jones, the wharfinger. There was likely a lock-keeper and watchman, as there were when the railway and dock were let in 1806 until the railway's closure in 1846. The dock continued after the railway's closure and was sold to James Watney and William Henry Wells at the nearby flour mill (Middle Mill). By 1865, and probably in 1861 when Watney and Wells dissolved their partnership, it was the property of William McMurray. McMurray was an important paper maker who made paper out of imported esparto grass, among other things. The company subsequently became bankrupt after a fire and legal dispute and the dock was sold at auction to the adjacent Wandsworth and District Gas Company in 1910. It fell into disuse and was subsequently filled in.

There was also a wharf with warehouses at Croydon, approximately bounded by the railway, Pitlake (which extended to Reeves Corner) and Waddon New Road, largely under today’s Roman Way extending west.

== Croydon, Merstham and Godstone Railway ==
Croydon, Merstham and Godstone Iron Railway Act 1803
- Act of Parliament
- Parliament of the United Kingdom
- Long title: An Act for making and maintaining a Railway from or from near a Place called Pitlake Meadow, in the Town of Croydon to or near to the Town of Reigate, in the County of Surrey, with a Collateral Branch from the said Railway, at or near a Place called Merstham, in the Parish of Merstham, to or near to a Place called Godstone Green, in the Parish of Godstone, all in the said County of Surrey.
- Citation: 43 Geo. 3. c. xxxv
- Territorial extent: United Kingdom

Dates
- Royal assent: 17 May 1803
- Commencement: 17 May 1803
- Repealed: 1 July 1839
Other legislation
Repealed by	Croydon, Merstham and Godstone Iron Railway Dissolution Act 1839

Status: Repealed

Text of statute as originally enacted

Jessop had hinted at the possibility of extending the railway to the Sussex coast in 1800 and at the SIR's first annual meeting in June 1802 it was agreed to enquire about opening "a communication with the sea ports in the Channel, and particularly with Portsmouth". The significance of Portsmouth was that naval supply ships sailing from London to Portsmouth could be attacked by French privateers. It was agreed to extend the railway to Reigate as the first stage of this route, with a branch to Godstone via Merstham and an act of Parliament for the purpose, the Croydon, Merstham and Godstone Iron Railway Act 1803 (43 Geo. 3. c. xxxv), was obtained on 17 May 1803. The railway's directors were directors of the Croydon, Merstham and Godstone Railway (CM&GR), supplemented by Colonel Hylton Jolliffe and his brother, Rev William John Jolliffe, who had land and mineral interests on its route.

Croydon, Merstham and Godstone Iron Railway Act 1806
- Act of Parliament
- Parliament of the United Kingdom
- Long title: An Act for better enabling the Company of Proprietors of the Croydon, Merstham and Godstone Iron Railway to complete the same.
- Citation: 46 Geo. 3. c. xciii
- Territorial extent: United Kingdom

Dates
- Royal assent: 3 July 1806
- Commencement: 3 July 1806
- Repealed: 1 July 1839
Other legislation
Repealed by	Croydon, Merstham and Godstone Iron Railway Dissolution Act 1839

Status: Repealed

Text of statute as originally enacted

Work started quickly and it opened to Merstham on 24 July 1805 – it never reached Godstone or Reigate. The track gauge was 4 ft 2 in (1,270 mm). The company ran out of money to pay its contractors, and the Croydon, Merstham and Godstone Iron Railway Act 1806 (46 Geo. 3. c. xciii) was passed to help the company raise the remaining £44,500 of the £90,000 capital they had originally been authorised to raise.

The engineering on the CM&GR was more substantial than the SIR, with an 8m high embankment at Coulsdon, parallel but southwest of Lion Green Road and a 9m deep cutting or cuttings near Merstham (on the east side of London Road North opposite Harps Oak Lane) that was nearly 1 km long. These have survived and are scheduled monuments. The cutting started just north of Dean Lane, which required a brick bridge to carry the road over the railway. There were two other bridges over the cutting, one 200m south for the entrance to Dean Farm, and the other about 125m south of Harps Oak Lane, just south of the A23 dual carriageway near where the houses begin.

The Coulsdon embankment extended over today's A23 where there was a brick archway "of sufficient height and width to admit a wagon loaded with hay, straw, faggots, or the like to pass underneath". Malcolm claims there was another embankment with brick arch to the south of Hooley (Note: Malcolm mentions Colonel Byron's (Hooley House)) where the road had to be lowered to pass under it; between Purley and Coulsdon the ground had to be levelled by cutting and filling. Accordingly, the gradient on the CM&GR was a steady 1 in 120. After the ground had been levelled, a foundation of chalk and flint was laid, which was pounded, watered and rolled. The stone blocks and rails were then laid and more chalk added, with a sprinkling of gravel ballast. Tharby's excavation revealed a flint rather than gravel "path" at Merstham. The CM&GR had its own toll houses at Croydon and Merstham; the latter is still standing as Weighbridge Cottage, 201 London Road North, and is a Grade II listed building.

Croydon, Merstham and Godstone Iron Railway Dissolution Act 1839
- Act of Parliament
- Parliament of the United Kingdom
- Long title: An Act for dissolving the Croydon, Merstham, and Godstone Iron Railway Company.
- Citation: 2 & 3 Vict. c. lii
- Territorial extent: United Kingdom

Dates
- Royal assent: 1 July 1839
- Commencement: 1 July 1839
Other legislation
Repeals/revokes	Croydon, Merstham and Godstone Iron Railway Act 1803; Croydon, Merstham and Godstone Iron Railway Act 1806

Status: Current legislation

Text of statute as originally enacted

The railway closed in 1838 when it was purchased by the London and Brighton Railway Company (L&BRC), and was dissolved by the Croydon, Merstham and Godstone Iron Railway Dissolution Act 1839 (2 & 3 Vict. c. liii). The L&BRC ordered the rails to be taken up and were subsequently sold. Through Croydon, the old tramway became Tramway Road and was later renamed Church Road.

== Canal tramway ==
The Croydon Canal Company had been authorised to build a road between West Croydon and Pitlake by the Croydon Canal and Croydon, Streatham, Dulwich and Sydenham Water Supply Act 1801 (41 Geo. 3. (U.K.) c. cxxvii), but this was not built until 1811, (Note: N.B. Tenders had been invited in 1808 (The Times 28 November 1808 p.2)) after additional funds were authorised by the Croydon Canal Act 1811 (51 Geo. 3. c. xi). It had a double track tramway with crossovers along its east side that interconnected with both the SIR and CM&GR. Unlike the gentle inclines on these railways, the gradient was an average of about 1 in 66 (15.2‰) and may have been 1 in 28 (35.7‰) at its steepest. Comparison with other tramways suggest that a horse or mule could pull trucks up the tramway, which like the road followed a longer, less direct path up the hillside. The road survives as today's Tamworth Road.

The company had a wharf at Pitlake, which they let with the tramway to Edward Grantham. At the canal basin the wagons were dragged up a short incline on to a platform using a windlass, which likely doubled as a 4 ton crane. The tramway was taken up in August 1836, and when the road was reopened in April 1840 it was for the exclusive use of rail passengers, despite it being a public carriage road.

== See also ==
- Llanelly and Mynydd Mawr Railway
- Timeline of railway history

== Bibliography ==
- Gerhold, Dorian (2010). "The Rise and Fall of the Surrey Iron Railway, 1802–46" (PDF). Surrey Archaeological Collections. 95: 193–210.
- Lee, Charles E. (1944). Early Railways in Surrey: the Surrey Iron Railway and its continuation the Croydon, Merstham & Godstone Iron Railway. London: Railway Gazette.
- Malcolm, James (1805). A Compendium of Modern Husbandry. Vol. 1. London: The Author.
- McGow, Peter (November 2001). "Surrey Iron Railway and Croydon, Merstham and Godstone Iron Railway, Notes on the Surrey Iron Railway".
- Montague, Eric N (2012). "Chapter 10: The Surrey Iron Railway". Mitcham Histories: Willow Lane and Beddington Corner. Vol. 13. Merton Historical Society. ISBN 9781903899649.
- Tredgold, Thomas (1825). A Practical Treatise on Rail-roads and Carriages. London: E. Bliss and E. White.
- Turner, John Howard (1977). The London Brighton and South Coast Railway: I – Origins and Formation. London: Batsford. ISBN 071340275X.
