= Wimbledon–West Croydon line =

Wimbledon–West Croydon
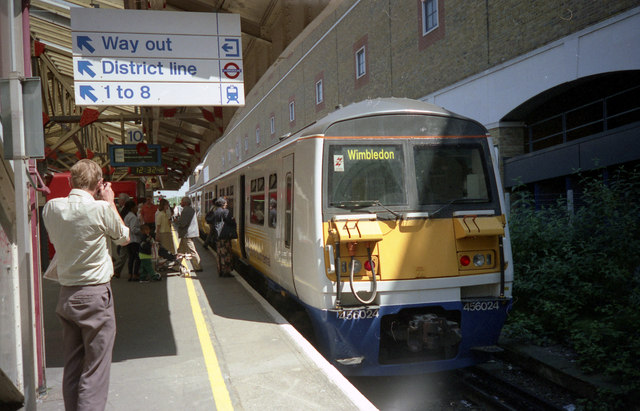
- Connex South Central Class 456 train at Wimbledon, on the final day of rail service on the line before its conversion to Tramlink

Overview
- Owner: Railtrack (1994–1997)
- ELR: MJW (Jn at Wimbledon–Mitcham North Jn); CMJ (Mitcham South Jn–West Croydon)
- Locale: Greater London
- Termini: Wimbledon; West Croydon

Service
- System: Tramlink

History
- Opened: 22 October 1855
- Closed: 2 June 1997
- Reopened for Tramlink: 30 May 2000

Technical
- Line length: approx. 6 miles 12 chains (9.9 km)
- Track gauge: 1,435 mm (4 ft 8 1/2 in) standard gauge

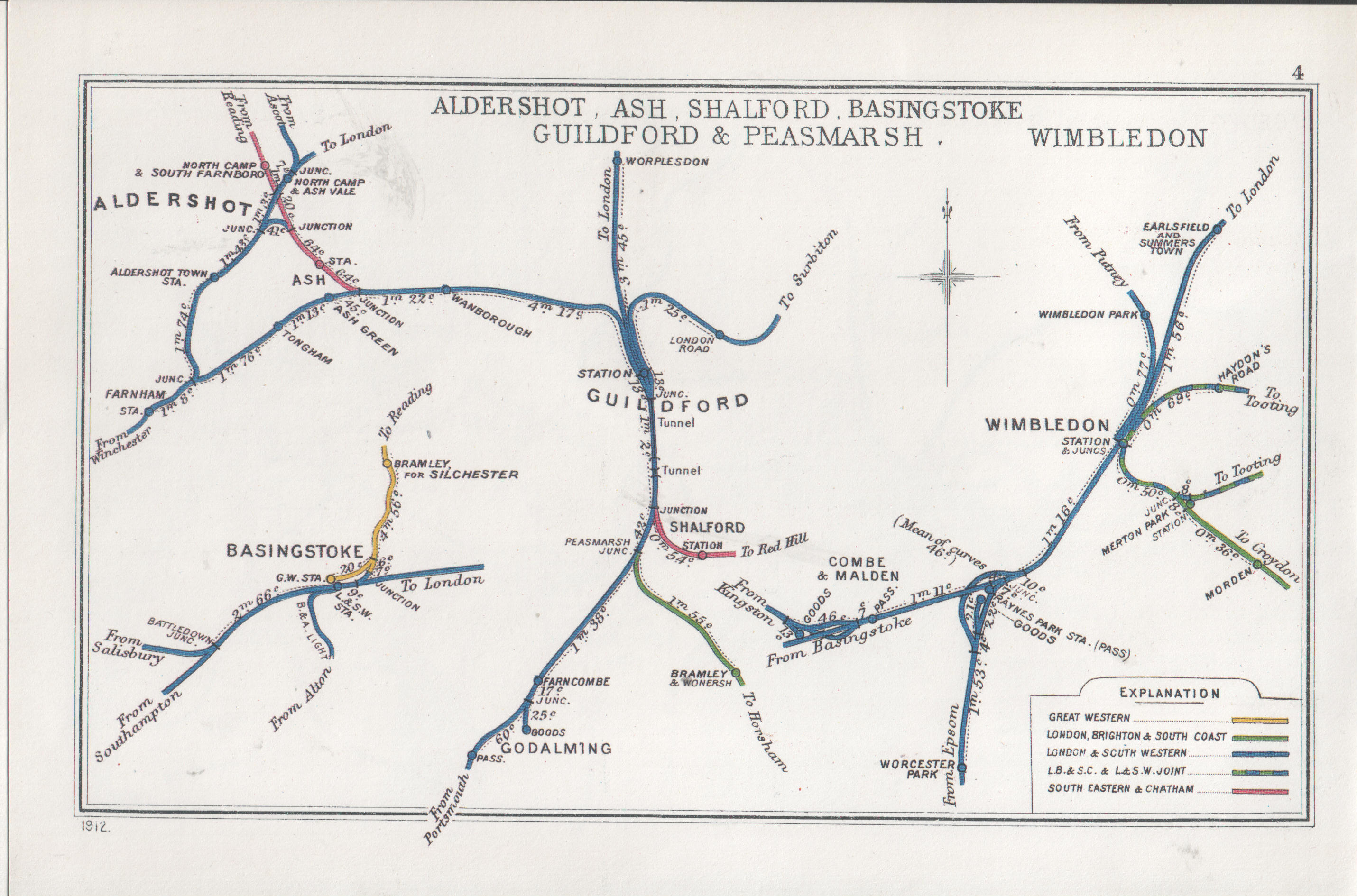
A 1912 Railway Clearing House map of the western end the line.

The Wimbledon–West Croydon line was a railway line in south London. It was opened in 1855 by the Wimbledon and Croydon Railway (W&CR) over part of the trackbed of the Surrey Iron Railway. It closed in May 1997 and now forms part of the Tramlink network.

== History ==
=== Origins ===
The valley of the River Wandle was heavily industrialised in the eighteenth century—the most industrialised in the south of England—and to convey minerals and agricultural products the Surrey Iron Railway was built, opening in 1803; it was a horse-drawn plateway in which the rails were L-shaped in cross-section, guiding ordinary wagon wheels. The Surrey Iron Railway was not successful, however, and after a long period of dormancy it closed in 1846.

Wimbledon became connected by railway to London when the London and Southampton Railway opened in 1838. The following year Croydon was connected to London Bridge when the London and Croydon Railway opened to a station at the site of the present-day West Croydon station. In the following years the London and Southampton Railway was renamed the London and South Western Railway (LSWR), and the London and Croydon Railway merged with other companies to form the London, Brighton and South Coast Railway (LB&SCR).

Wimbledon and Croydon Railway Act 1853
- Act of Parliament
- Parliament of the United Kingdom
- Long title: An Act for making a Railway from Wimbledon to Croydon in the County of Surrey, to be called "The Wimbledon and Croydon Railway," and for other Purposes.
- Citation: 16 & 17 Vict. c. lxxxvi

Dates
- Royal assent: 8 July 1853

Text of statute as originally enacted

There was pressure for a railway linking the towns and serving the industry in the area, and on 8 July 1853 the Wimbledon and Croydon Railway obtained the Wimbledon and Croydon Railway Act 1853 (16 & 17 Vict. c. lxxxvi) to build an 11-mile line from Wimbledon to Epsom, joining the LSWR and the LB&SCR at the ends. The scheme was modified to form a 5¾ mile line from Wimbledon to (West) Croydon. The line opened on 22 October 1855.

=== Operation ===
Initially, it was operated under contract by its engineer George Parker Bidder, but in 1856 it was leased to the LB&SCR, which purchased it outright in 1866. After construction of the line from Merton Park to Tooting in 1868 the section from Wimbledon to Merton Park became joint LSWR/LB&SCR.

At first the passenger train service was six weekday and two Sunday trains each way. This gradually increased over the years, with some trains extended from Croydon to Crystal Palace Low Level in the steam era.

On 1 October 1868 the LB&SCR opened its new line from Peckham Rye to Sutton, which intersected the Wimbledon and Croydon line, joining it and leaving it again by two sharp curves either side of the new Mitcham Junction station.

Push and pull working of passenger trains started in 1919, and the line was electrified on the third rail system on 6 July 1930.

On 1 January 1923, under the 1921 grouping, it became part of the Southern Railway. In the latter half of the twentieth century, the industrial use declined, and passenger numbers suffered also.

Upon the privatisation of British Rail, during the last year of the line being part of the Railtrack network passenger services were operated by Connex South Central. The last public train ran on 31 May 1997 and the line closed on 2 June 1997 for most of it to be converted into the Croydon Tramlink network. A railtour consisting of two sets of 4VEPs was the last train to run on the line after the regular services, as well as on the Addiscombe Line later that evening.

=== Tramlink ===
To become part of the Tramlink network the section of the line from just south of Waddon Marsh to West Croydon was removed. Instead a flyover across the line to Sutton was constructed down to street level . The line reopened on 30 May 2000.

== Stations ==
=== Wimbledon ===
At Wimbledon, the LSWR had a through station with four platforms, and the Wimbledon and Croydon Railway had a separate platform. When the LBSCR/LSWR joint line via Tooting was opened in 1868, this was expanded to two platforms for the W&CR: platform 5 (Up Tooting) and platform 6 (Down Merton). The station had its own approach road from the Broadway, and was managed independently, with a goods yard at the north-eastern end.

The line left in a south-westerly direction and immediately curved south-east on a 14-chain curve. The line to Lower Merton (Merton Park) was doubled as part of the Tooting & Merton railway construction.

=== Merton Park ===
At first there was no station here, but the line from Tooting opened on 1 October 1868 forming a junction here, and a station was opened on the Tooting line only; it was named Lower Merton. The Tooting to Wimbledon line was double track, but the Croydon line remained single; a platform was added on 1 November 1870. Kingston Road, at the north-west end of the station was a very busy main road at the time, and had a level crossing.

The Tooting line ceased to operate passenger trains from 3 March 1929.

=== Morden Road ===
Opened as Morden and then Morden Halt, the station was later called Morden Road (from 2 July 1951).

=== Mitcham ===
Mitcham had a small goods yard south-west of the line, north-west of the passenger station.

The passenger station is now (1996) listed and converted to offices. Mitchell and Smith say that "A claim has been made for Mitcham as being the oldest continuously working station site in the world, the Surrey Iron Railway having been in use here from 1803." However the word continuously seems to be negated by the closure of the Surrey Iron Railway after a long period of dormancy in 1846, nine years before the opening of the Wimbledon and Croydon Railway.

=== Mitcham Junction ===
The station opened with the new Peckham Rye to Sutton line on 1 October 1868. The line from Streatham curved in from the north-east at the Wimbledon end of the station, and the line to Sutton curved away to the south-west at the Croydon end. There was a passenger bay that could be used for Croydon trains.

A little west of the station, a thoroughfare called Tramway Path turns southwards; this marks the alignment of the Surrey Iron Railway's Hackbridge branch.

=== Beddington Lane ===
In the later decades of the twentieth century the signalman issued tickets from the signalbox.

=== Waddon Marsh ===
The station opened as Waddon Marsh Halt at the date of the electrification, 6 July 1930. A timber island platform was provided. Either side of the station area were considerable industrial plants and sidings serving them; they included gasworks and electricity generating plant. In later years of the twentieth century tickets were issued by the signalman from the signalbox.

=== West Croydon ===
West Croydon station had been built on the site of the terminal basin of the Croydon Canal. It opened as a terminus for the London and Croydon Railway in 1839, becoming a through station for the LB&SCR extension to Epsom in 1847. The Wimbledon and Croydon Railway was given a bay platform at the station.
