= Southside Wandsworth =

Shopping centre in London, England

Coordinates: 51°27′17″N 0°11′37″W

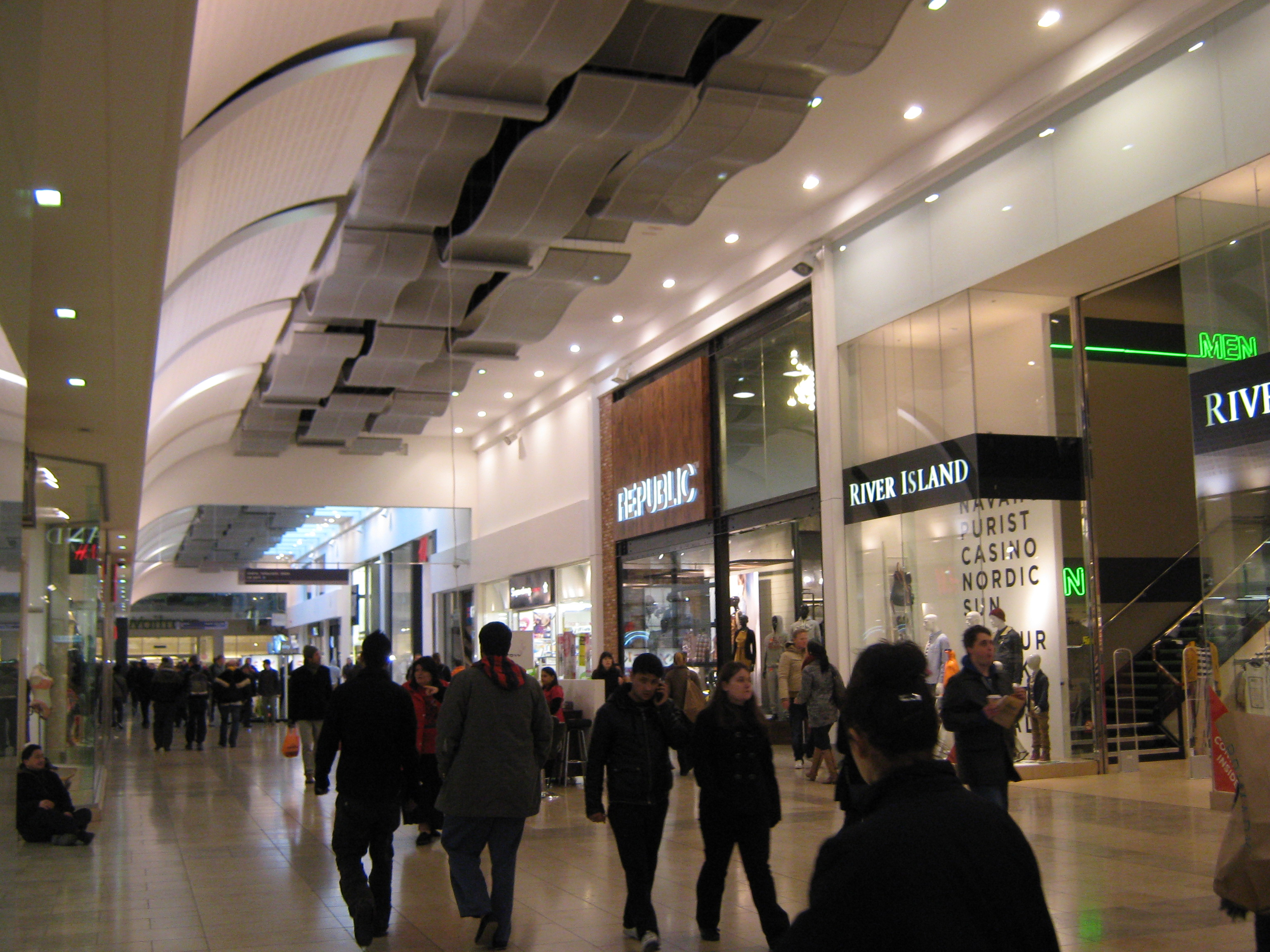
- Interior view of the main mall
- Location: Wandsworth, London, England
- Opened: 1971; 55 years ago
- Manager: Landsec
- Owner: Landsec
- Num. of stores: 110 including a Nuffield Health, The Gym Group and Cineworld Cinema
- Num. of anchor tenants: 3 Waitrose, Gravity, TK Maxx
- Floor area: 606,000 sq ft (56,300 m^{2})
- Floors: 2
- Parking: 1180 spaces
- Website: southsidewandsworth.com

Southside Wandsworth is a shopping centre in the district of Wandsworth in London, England.

== Overview ==
Southside opened in 1971 as the Wandsworth Arndale Centre, and was the largest of the UK-wide chain of Arndale Centres with 110 shops. It occupies much of the town centre of Wandsworth, with five blocks of apartments above and the River Wandle running beneath, in a culvert. It initially included a mix of shops, offices and restaurants, as well as a market traders hall, although the latter has since been redeveloped. At one point it also housed a large nightclub, which closed in 2002 following complaints submitted to Wandsworth Council about noise.

The centre suffered a notable decline in the 1980s and 1990s, before being extensively renovated and relaunched in 2004.

The shopping centre is anchored by a Waitrose supermarket, large TK Maxx and a new 81,880 square feet (7,607 m^{2}) Gravity Active Entertainment.

A large branch of Sainsbury's is located opposite on Garratt Lane together with a Premier Inn hotel and branch of Sports Direct.

Occupying 606,000 square feet (56,300 m^{2}) of space, Southside remains one of London's largest shopping centres in terms of its ground floor square footage and currently attracts around 8.5 million visitors a year. Redevelopment of the eastern section of the centre fronting Garratt Lane was completed in October 2015, with a £40 million project involving the demolition of office accommodation and the creation of a further 220,000 square feet (20,000 m^{2}) of retail space.

== Stores ==
The centre is split into four indoor malls plus a street-frontage along Garratt Lane.

- The south mall contains a large Decathlon store, Caffè Nero, Søstrene Grene, Claire's, EE-BT, Nationwide Building Society, Pandora and Waterstones.
- The upper mall has a food court containing a Five Guys, Ekachai, Smoky Boys and a Nando's, plus a 14-screen Cineworld Cinema and a children's play area.
- The central mall contains stores such as Boots, Lidl, Greggs, H&M, Søstrene Grene, JD Sports, The Works, Next, Primark, Superdrug, Accessorize, Oliver Bonas, Uniqlo, TGJones and Office.
- The north mall contains stores such as Poundland, Robert Dyas, Card Factory, Specsavers, CeX, Vodafone, TK Maxx and MINISO.
- The Garratt Lane frontage contains branches of McDonald's, Wagamama, Starry Mart, Taco Bell and Wingstop.

There are also two gyms in the centre, with a Nuffield Health gym on the Wandsworth High Street end, and a branch of The Gym Group on Garratt Lane.

Notable former retailers include Tesco (who left in the 1990s), Sainsbury's (who moved to a larger supermarket on Garratt Lane opposite the centre) and Woolworths (in a unit facing Garratt Lane which was demolished in 2005). Debenhams closed in January 2020 and Amazon Fresh also previously had a branch in the centre along the Garratt Lane frontage, which closed in July 2023.

== History ==
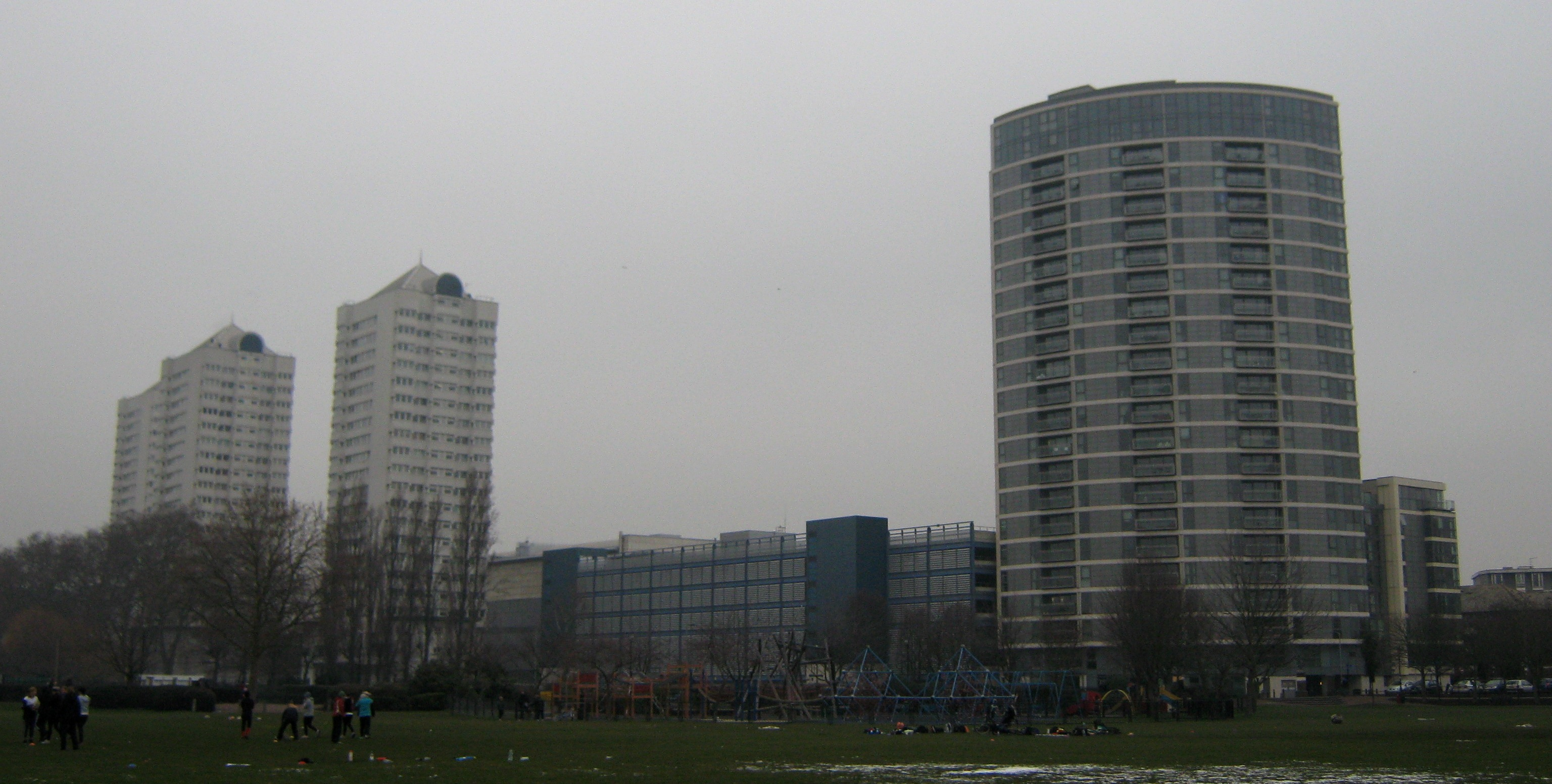
The centre from King George's Park, showing four of the five tower blocks built near to the shopping centre

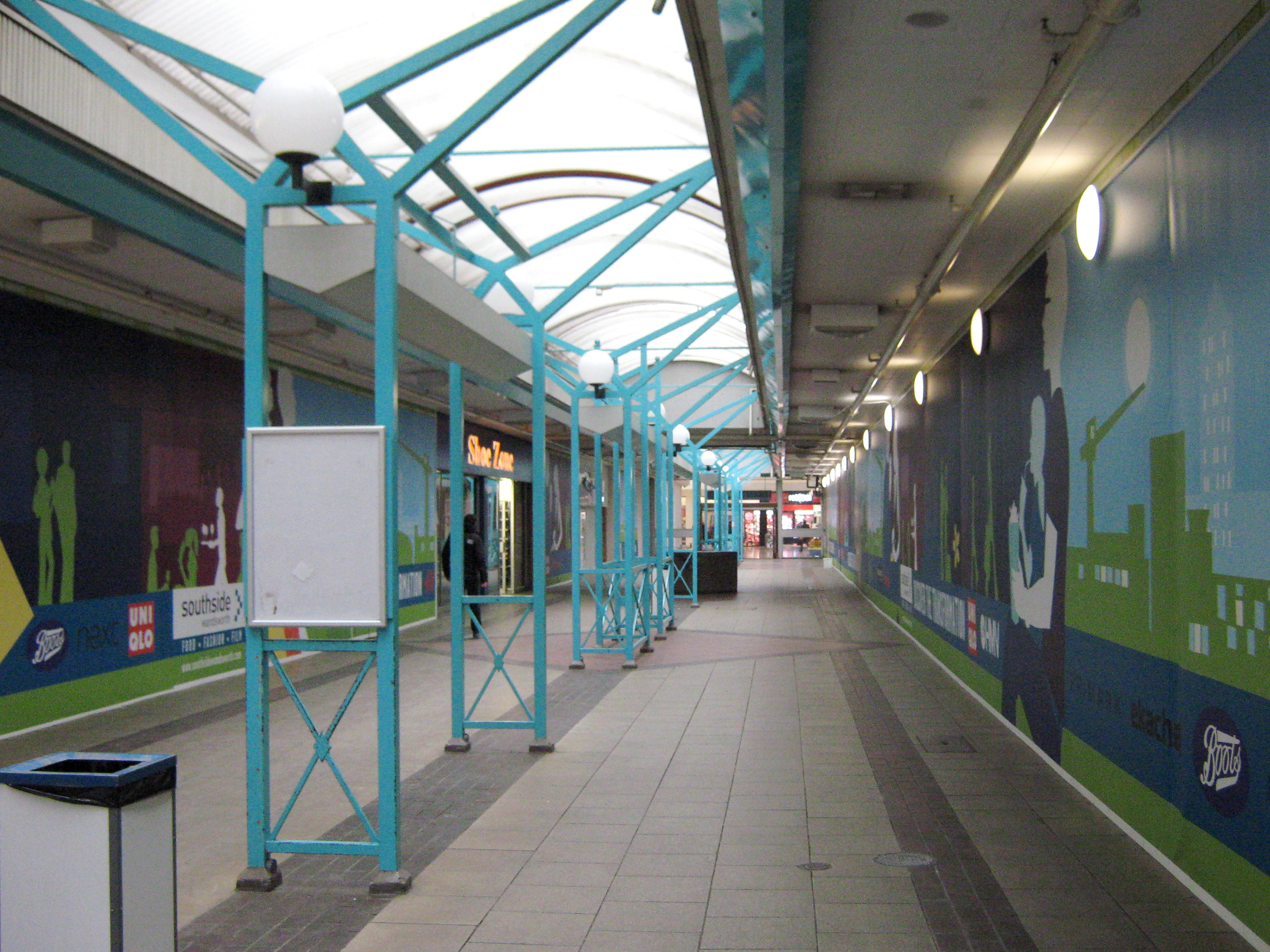
Boarded up shops in Arndale Walk, the last "1970s" part of the centre, which was demolished in 2013

The site now occupied by the shopping centre was previously the Wandsworth Greyhound Stadium (which seated 20,000) and the Upper Mill (a large flour mill, damaged by fire in the 1920s and demolished in 1964). The Arndale complex was designed to be relatively self-contained, with few connections to the surrounding shopping streets other than service and delivery entrances, and the value of the complex was increased by the construction of five high-rise blocks above the main shopping area, and the provision of over a thousand parking spaces in multistorey car parks. The complex included a health clinic and a day centre, as well as a post office. Because it was built over the River Wandle, it was considered "something of an architectural and engineering achievement". However, it was not universally popular, and its large size led to it being described by a contemporary commentator as "one of London’s great architectural disasters".

Although initially successful (helped by being located at the junction of several major roads including the A3), it steadily drifted downmarket in the decades after its construction aided by the departure of its original anchor tenants such as Sainsbury's who moved outside onto Garratt Lane and Tesco. This, coupled with increasing competition from nearby centres such as StopShop in Clapham Junction, Centre Court (now Wimbledon Quarter) in Wimbledon and Putney Exchange in Putney, led to a severe decline in the fortunes of the centre – at one stage it was said that the centre had seen the influx of so many downmarket shops that "it's become hard to buy anything at the centre for over £1".

However, Wandsworth was by the 1990s seeing extensive gentrification, and it was clear that the centre was in a particularly strategic location, with a large and prosperous ABC1 population on the centre's doorstep – many of whom were choosing to shop further away due to the lack of retail facilities on their doorstep. To be successful, major national clothing retailers rather than discount stores, physical improvements and a complete relaunch would be needed to provide Wandsworth town centre with a neighbourhood shopping centre that would be attractive to the population of the area.

Work therefore began to extensively refurbish and extend the complex in 2000. This included the complete demolition and reconstruction of the southern end of the structure, to add a new 860-space multistorey car park, a 14-screen Cineworld cinema and a food concourse. A large Waitrose supermarket was also built. A glazed roof to the Central Mall was introduced to make better use of natural light - a common but now outdated feature of Arndale centres had been that the walkways were deliberately kept dark, so that the lights from the shops would shine out.

This redevelopment was followed by construction of a 23-storey residential development at the southern end of the complex by Barratt Developments. Wandsworth Borough Council refurbished the existing residential apartment blocks in 2003/4. The name of the centre was temporarily changed from Wandsworth Arndale Centre to the Wandsworth Shopping Centre, before finally being branded as Southside in 2004.

== Renovation and redevelopment ==
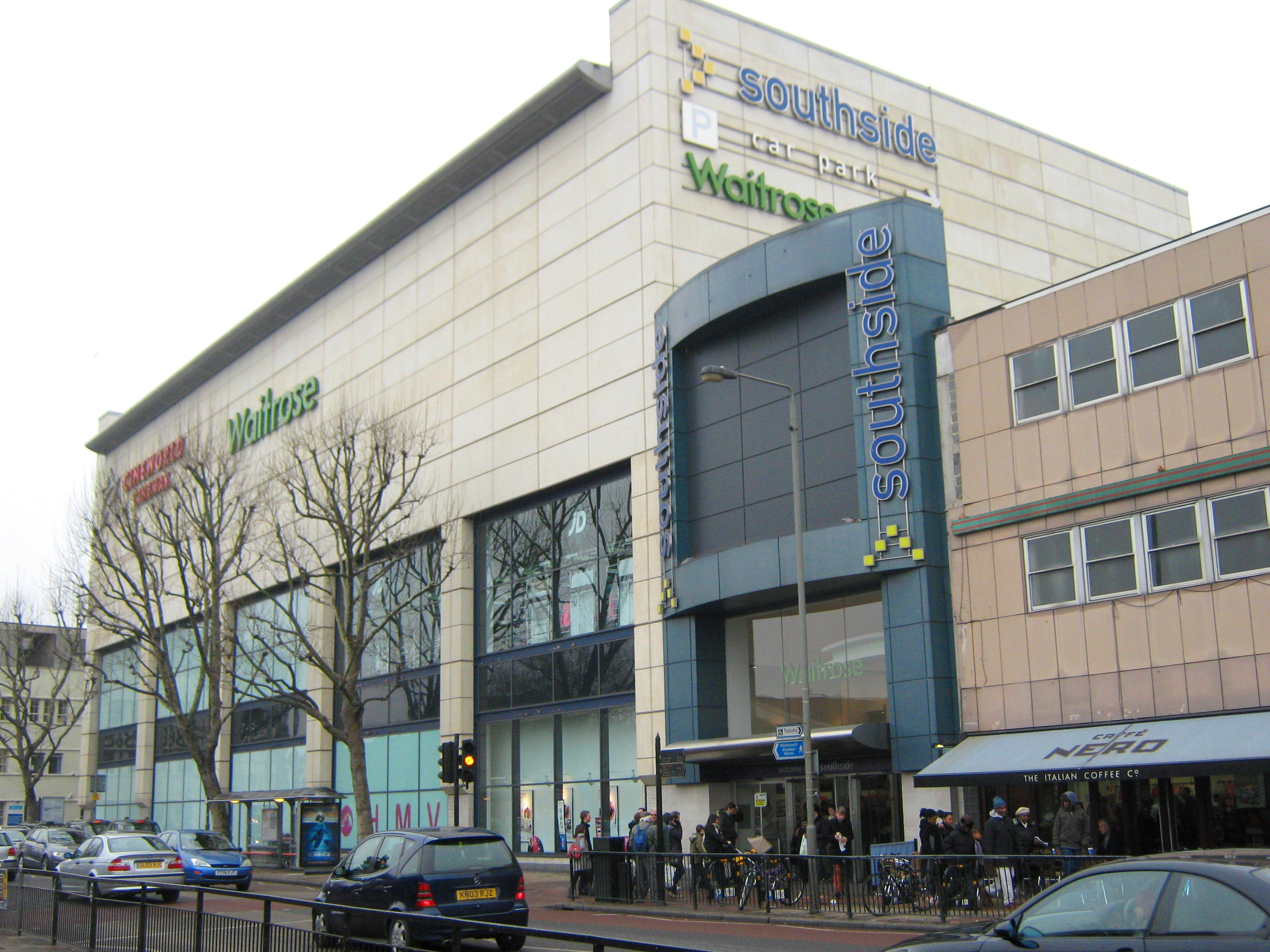
Garratt Lane entrance, showing a redeveloped and extended part of the centre (on the left, with the cinema above the shops), and the lower 1971 structure (on the right)

Southside is now owned by Landsec Investment Firms. The centre continues to be redeveloped.

In February 2010, work started to reconfigure the northern end of the centre, creating larger retail units and an enhanced street frontage, and linking with a major retail and residential development that is scheduled to take place on an adjacent site following the departure of the Ram Brewery from Wandsworth town centre. The smaller units in the North Mall were amalgamated to provide a large anchor store (covering 30,000 square feet (2,800 m^{2})) let to TK Maxx.

Further development of Southside has taken place in two phases. The most recently completed phase has involved the demolition and replacement of the centre's dilapidated eastern frontage along Garratt Lane to create 20,000 feet (6,100 m) of new shopfronts. In 2013, the Arndale Walk part of the centre was demolished, to create a 82,000 square feet (7,600 m^{2}) department store unit and four additional retail units fronting Garratt Lane and four units on the junction of Garratt Lane and Wandsworth High Street. It was announced in October 2012 that the department store unit was let to Debenhams.

Debenhams closed in January 2020, shortly after the company went into administration. It is now an amusement centre with an indoor electric go-karting track.

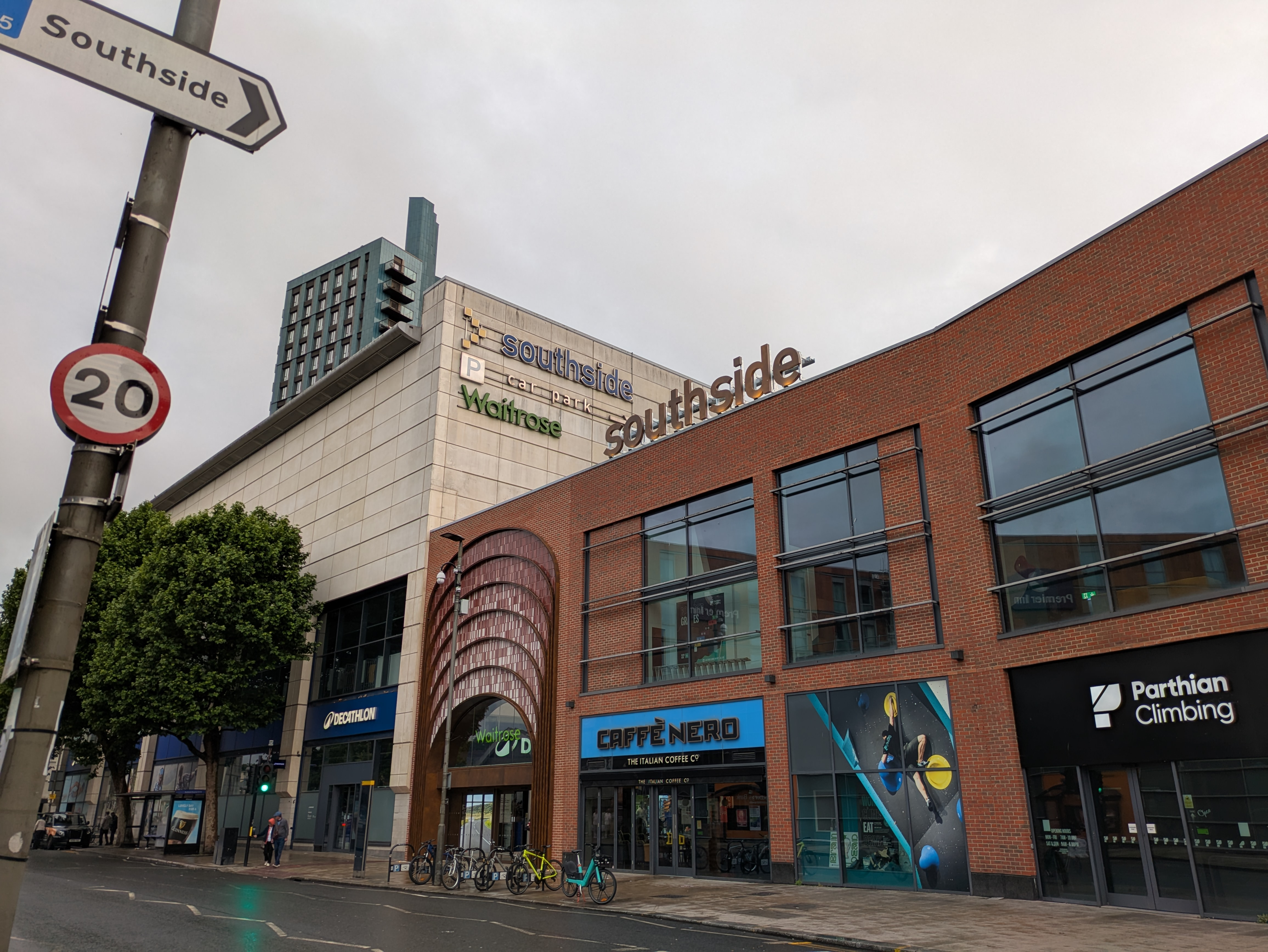
The redeveloped Garratt Lane entrance as of 2025

Relocation of the Wandsworth branch of Jobcentre Plus (which occupied a four-storey office building above Arndale Walk, that needed to be demolished as part of the second stage of the redevelopment) proved to be controversial, with few alternative locations available, and opposition to the possibility of it being moved to a residential area in Southfields.

In January 2024, it was announced that a new Lidl supermarket would open in the centre by summer 2024 due to a 'lack of accessible discount supermarkets' in the area. Lidl opened on 13 June 2024. Lidl held an official ribbon-cutting ceremony at 8am attended by the Mayor of Wandsworth.

In July 2024, Southside announced its plans to completely refresh lighting throughout the centre and entrance exteriors to the centre, on Garratt Lane, Neville Gill Close and Wandsworth High Street, and a redesign of the first floor of centre, with new seating to be introduced to encourage visitors to come together. Rebecca Ruddle, director of Southside, said she wants to give visitors an ‘unrivalled experience’ at the venue. Work began in July 2024 and was completed in May 2025.

== Ownership and financing ==
In the 1990s the centre was owned by Fordgate Wandsworth Limited (a large property company who at the time owned similar developments including the Pallasades Shopping Centre in Birmingham), and ultimately by property investors Moises and Mendi Gertner. Conscious that the value of the centre was declining, with the departure of both Sainsbury's and Tesco, and declining customer footfall, in 1993 they gained outline planning permission for a 10-screen cinema, expected to cost around £6.5m. The multiplex cinema would later become one of the first branches of Cineworld, whose Chief Executive, Steve Wiener had long known Mr Gertner.

In 2000, before construction work began on the redevelopment, Fordgate sold the centre to Portfolio Holdings Limited, a UK property company formed in 1993 which had concluded several town centre developments. Their majority shareholder was the Apollo organisation which managed several large property investment funds, based in the US. They acquired the lease of the Arndale Centre for £40 million with the aim of implementing the planning consents for a multiplex cinema, health club and associated retail units, with some modifications to the detailing, particularly to the mall entrances, mall finishes and lighting. Their financing came from German private bank BHF Bank (who provided borrowing facilities of £55m for the acquisition and redevelopment of the centre), plus their own resources and those of their American partners Apollo Real Estate.

Portfolio used a limited partnership, Wandsworth LP, as a specific investment vehicle for the development. Wandsworth LP was effectively a joint venture between Portfolio Holdings, Apollo Real Estate Advisors and Deutsche Bank Real Estate's Global Opportunities Fund, and was used in order to meet the preference of their American shareholders for tax transparency.

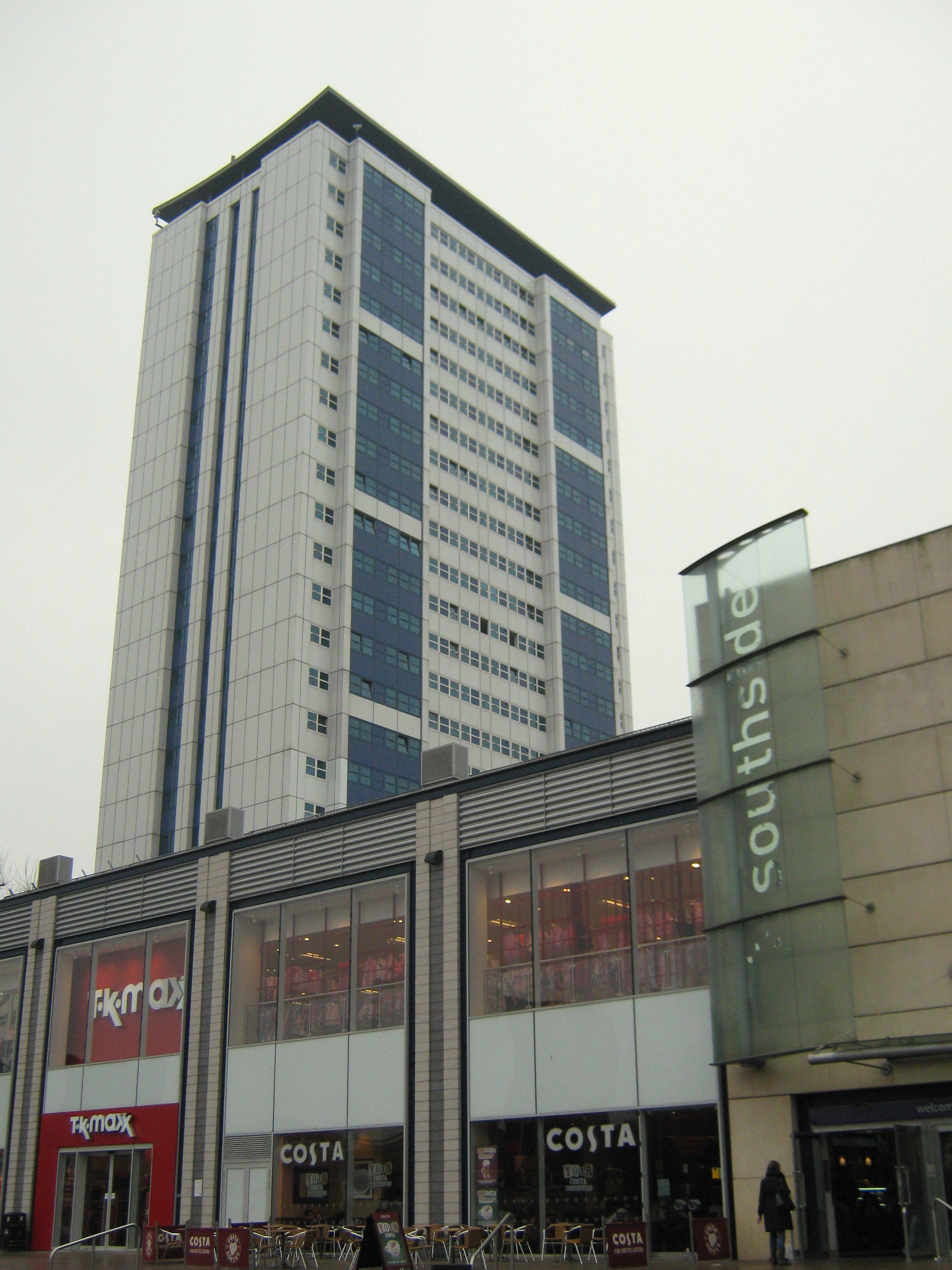
The northern entrance, which was reclad as part of the Wandsworth LP redevelopment in the early 2000s

Between 2000 and 2004 Wandsworth LP implemented a £75m investment in the refurbishment of the centre. The first phase was the construction of a health club on the Buckhold Road frontage (let to Virgin Active, now Nuffield Health), and securing conditional agreement for a 35,000 sq ft branch of Waitrose (who signed the agreement to lease in December 2001 as the first 'new' anchor tenant, and opened in 2004). They obtained a revised planning permission in 2002 for a larger and more extensive redevelopment than the previous Fordgate Wandsworth project, which included a 36,000 sq ft branch of Primark, an increase in the size of the cinema to 14 screens, as well as the demolition and reconstruction of the southern end of the centre including retail space and the multistorey car park, and a comprehensive refurbishment of the interior of the centre (aside from Arndale Walk), and implemented these plans over the following two years.

On 11 August 2005, Wandsworth LP sold the centre to Metro Shopping Fund for £188 million. The Metro Shopping Fund is a 50:50 joint venture between Land Securities and Delancey, formed in 2004, which at the time also owned several other London shopping centres including the nearby ShopStop at Clapham Junction. Metro Shopping Fund continued the improvement of the centre, demolishing the eastern side of the old centre (the Garratt Lane elevation), creating a series of double-height units within the centre on the Central mall (using previously derelict rooftop recreation areas) and bringing in further tenants TK Maxx, Gap, H&M Kids and New Look. Construction of retail units along the Garratt Lane frontage was put on hold, because of the economic recession in 2008, and plans were scaled down with a revised permission obtained for a smaller development that did not have residential apartments above the retail units. Metro Shopping Fund secured a financing facility to support the development of the two phases of the extension along Garratt Lane (the first of which is now complete), from Bayerische Landesbank and Deutsche Pfandbriefbank.
