= Bedford Row, Limerick =

Bedford Row
- Interactive map of Bedford Row
- Native name: Rae Bedford (Irish)
- Namesake: John Russell, 4th Duke of Bedford
- Length: 190 m (620 ft)
- Width: 17 metres (56 ft)
- Location: Limerick, Ireland
- Postal code: V94
- Coordinates: 52.663665°N 8.628463°W
- northwest end: Harvey's Quay
- southeast end: O'Connell Street

Other
- Known for: shops

Bedford Row (Irish: Rae Bedford) is a shopping street in Limerick, Ireland. The street is named after John Russell, 4th Duke of Bedford who was Lord Lieutenant of Ireland from 1757 to 1761. The street starts at a junction with O'Connell Street and continues westwards forming a junction with Henry Street and continues between Dunnes Stores and the Augustinian Church and ends at Howley's Quay.

Bedford Row has seen extensive investment and redevelopment in the past few years. The street has been pedestrianised between O'Connell Street and Henry Street and the south facing end of the street has been completely redeveloped into a new modern shopping street.

The street was also the location of the 1,000 seater Savoy Theatre until 1989, when it was demolished to make way for a new cinema complex. This has since been demolished and transformed into the 5 star Savoy Hotel. A Methodist Church was once on Bedford Row but is now closed. The front facade is retained in The Gallery (Regus offices) and Sostrene Grene.

== Shops and cafés/restaurants trading on Bedford Row ==
Retail

- Bank of Ireland
- Sostrene Grene
- Dealz
- Diesel
- Connolly Men
- Noel's Menswear
- City Central Shoes
- Schuh

Cafés/Restaurants

- Supermacs
- The Spitjack
- Cavavin Wine Bar
- The Bedford Townhouse & Café
