= Municipal Borough of Wimbledon =

Local government area of England

Coordinates: 51.4212°N 0.2045°W

Wimbledon
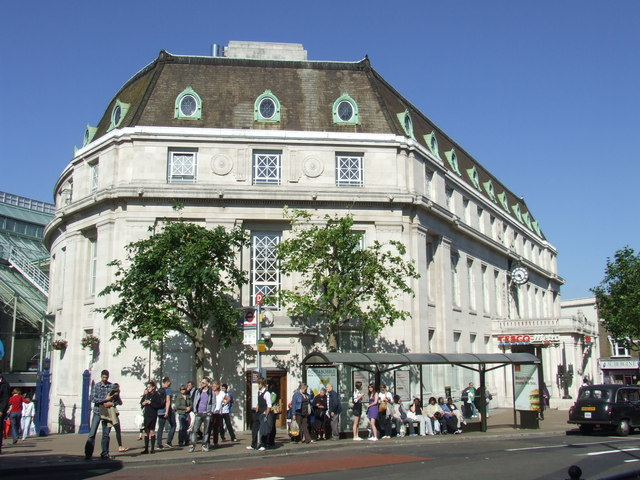
- Wimbledon Town Hall
- Area
  - 1911: 3,221 acres (13.03 km^{2})
  - 1961: 3,221 acres (13.03 km^{2})
- Population
  - 1901: 41,652
  - 1961: 57,312
- History
  - Created: 1866
  - Abolished: 1965
  - Succeeded by: London Borough of Merton
- Status: local board (1866 - 1894) urban district (1894 - 1905) municipal borough (after 1905)
- Government
  - HQ: Wimbledon Town Hall (1931–1965)
  - Motto: Sine Labe Decus (Honour without stain)
- Coat of arms of the municipal borough

Wimbledon was a local government district in north-east Surrey from 1866 to 1965 covering the town of Wimbledon and its surrounding area. It was part of the London postal district and Metropolitan Police District.

== History ==
Wimbledon Local Government District was formed in 1866 when the parish of Wimbledon adopted the Local Government Act 1858, forming a local board of 15 members to govern the area. The Local Government Act 1894 reconstituted the area as an urban district. The town was granted a charter of incorporation to become a municipal borough in 1905. A borough council consisting of a mayor, six aldermen and eighteen councillors replaced the urban district council. The original Wimbledon Town Hall was built on The Broadway. This was replaced by a new Town Hall on the corner of Queen's Road and Wimbledon Bridge in 1931.

The borough was granted a coat of arms in 1906. The arms incorporated heraldic elements associated with the history of the borough through the centuries. A black double-headed eagle refers to the legend that Julius Caesar once made camp on the common, a sheaf of corn is borrowed from the arms of the Cecil family and the two Cornish Choughs above the crown are taken from the arms of Thomas Cromwell. The new borough took as its motto "Sine Labe Decus" meaning: "Honour without Stain".

In 1914 Wimbledon unsuccessfully promoted a bill to become a county borough.

The borough was abolished in 1965 by the London Government Act 1963 and the area was transferred to Greater London to be combined with that the Municipal Borough of Mitcham and the Merton and Morden Urban District to form the present-day London Borough of Merton.
