= Wimbledon Town Hall =

Municipal building in London, England

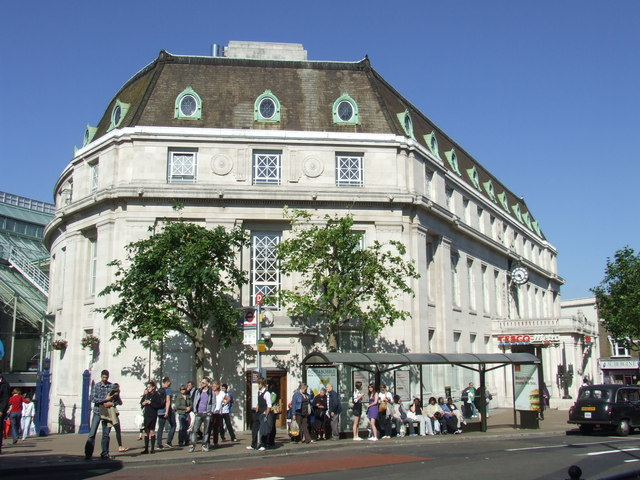
- Wimbledon Town Hall

- Shown in Merton
- 51.4208°N 0.2051°W
- Location: The Broadway, Wimbledon

History
- Built: 1931

Site notes
- Architect: Bradshaw Gass & Hope
- Architectural style: Classical style

Listed Building – Grade II
- Designated: 27 May 1986
- Reference no.: 1358018

Wimbledon Town Hall is a municipal building in The Broadway, Wimbledon, London. It is a Grade II listed building.

== History ==
The building was commissioned to replace the aging public offices on the same site which had been designed by Thomas Goodchild in the Italianate style and completed in 1878. After the area became an urban district in 1894 and then a municipal borough in 1905, civic leaders decided that the old public offices were inadequate for their needs and should be demolished to make way for a new building.

The new building, which was designed by Bradshaw Gass & Hope in the Classical style, was officially opened by Prince George on 5 November 1931. Edward Foster VC, who had been born in Streatham, was present for the ceremony. The design involved a symmetrical frontage with eleven bays at the junction of Queen's Road and the Broadway; the outer bays projected forward slightly and incorporated huge Doric order pilasters, while the central section of three bays featured a portico flanked by Doric order columns and pilasters on the ground floor with the borough coat of arms above; there were square-headed windows in all the bays on the first floor with a mansard roof above. The complex originally included an assembly hall at the rear and a "Kinema" for showing silent films; the complex was equipped with a pipe organ made by John Compton allowing it to host a regular programme of concerts by the Wimbledon Symphony Orchestra.

During the Second World War, a civil defence control centre was installed in the basement and observation posts were placed on the roof. The town hall continued to be used as a public venue and concert performers included the contralto singer, Kathleen Ferrier, who made an appearance on 25 April 1950.

The building served as the headquarters of the Municipal Borough of Wimbledon for much of the 20th century and continued to serve as the local seat of government of the enlarged London Borough of Merton after it was formed in 1965. However, it became surplus to requirements after the council moved to Crown House in Morden in 1985. Following three planning inquiries, the assembly hall at the rear was demolished in the late 1980s, to make way for the Centre Court Shopping Centre. This left only the front range in place, which itself was converted for retail use to the designs of the Building Design Partnership in 1990. The groceries retailer, Tesco, moved into the ground floor of former front range of the town hall while the clothing business, H&M, took the first floor a few years later.
