= Moises Gertner =

British Businessman

- Born: August 1957
- Known for: Real estate Property development

Moises Gertner (born August 1957) is British businessman in real estate, property development, and natural resource commodities. Moises and his brother Mendi Gertner were formerly listed in the 2009 Sunday Times Rich List, with an estimated net worth of £450 million.

== Business career ==
Through their company, Fordgate, Gertner and his brother Mendi had a European property portfolio once valued at over 2.5 billion Euros. Their properties included Canon Bridge House the previous headquarters of Lazard Bank in the City of London Corporation as well as the Southside Wandsworth shopping center. They were also significant shareholders of Nikanor, a copper miner that floated on AIM in 2006 and was eventually taken over by global commodities group Glencore.

The brothers were introduced to Kaupthing Bank through Robert Tchenguiz, and they consequently acquired a 2.5% stake in Kaupthing, purchased with a loan from the same bank. However, their property portfolio faced ruin after the 2008 financial crisis and the 2008–2011 Icelandic financial crisis, which included Kaupthing Bank.

== Litigation ==
In 2015, Gertner held one of the largest private debts in history, at more than 610 million GBP, primarily to Kaupthing Bank as well as several Jewish charities and individual investors. Gertner initially proposed a repayment plan that returned a very small amount of money to his creditors with a total of 500,000 GBP was to be split between all creditors. The small settlement prompting the Charity Commission to open an investigation to determine if more regulatory action was needed.

In 2019, Gertner was forced to declare bankruptcy by the High Court of England and Wales. By this time, his debts had reached almost 800 million GBP, and the court refused to back the settlement plan Gertner had proposed. It was discovered that Gertner and Kaupthing had created a side deal to the settlement plan which the court said constituted as a "breach of good faith." As a result, and at the request of his largest creditors, Gertner had to declare bankruptcy. The bankruptcy order was set aside on appeal.

== Personal life ==
For several years, the Gertner brothers have been in several long running legal disputes with billionaires Dan Gertler, Robert Tchenguiz, and Beny Steimetz as well as Kaupthing Bank in Iceland.
