= Wimbledon Quarter =

Complex in London, England

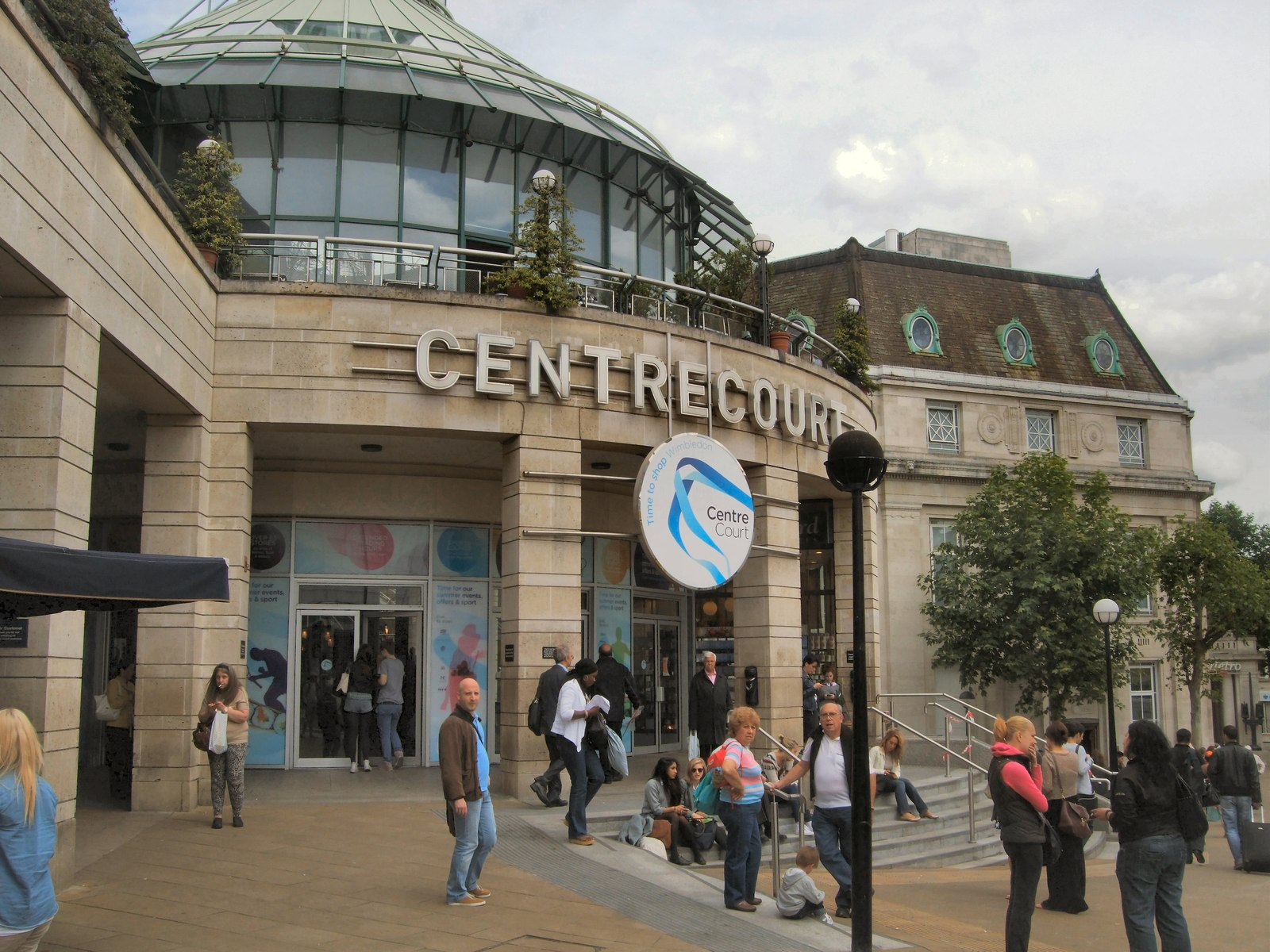
- Location: Wimbledon, London, England
- Opened: 1990; 36 years ago
- Owner: Romulus Holdings
- Num. of anchor tenants: 1
- Floor area: 70,297 m2 (756,670 sq ft)
- Website: https://wimbledonquarter.com

Wimbledon Quarter (formerly known as Centre Court Shopping Centre) is a shopping and office complex in Wimbledon, London, England.

== History ==
Centre Court Shopping Centre was developed on land next to the Wimbledon station, providing a much-needed focus, and opened in 1990. The shopping centre incorporated the old town hall building. A new portico, in keeping with the old work, was designed by Sir George Grenfell-Baines, who had worked on the original designs over fifty years before. The centre was named after the Centre Court tennis court, also in Wimbledon.

Following anchor tenant Debenhams' closure in January 2020, Centre Court seen a decline in footfall. Property group Romulus Holdings acquired the shopping centre for more than £70 million in April 2022.

In 2022, Romulus began a major redevelopment at Centre Court, seeing the shopping centre becoming more of a "neighbourhood hub" with retail, offices and dining being the main focuses. The complex's interior would be modernised with a new retractable roof being the main attraction and the Debenhams unit would also be split into multiple units. Major public realm changes would also happen.

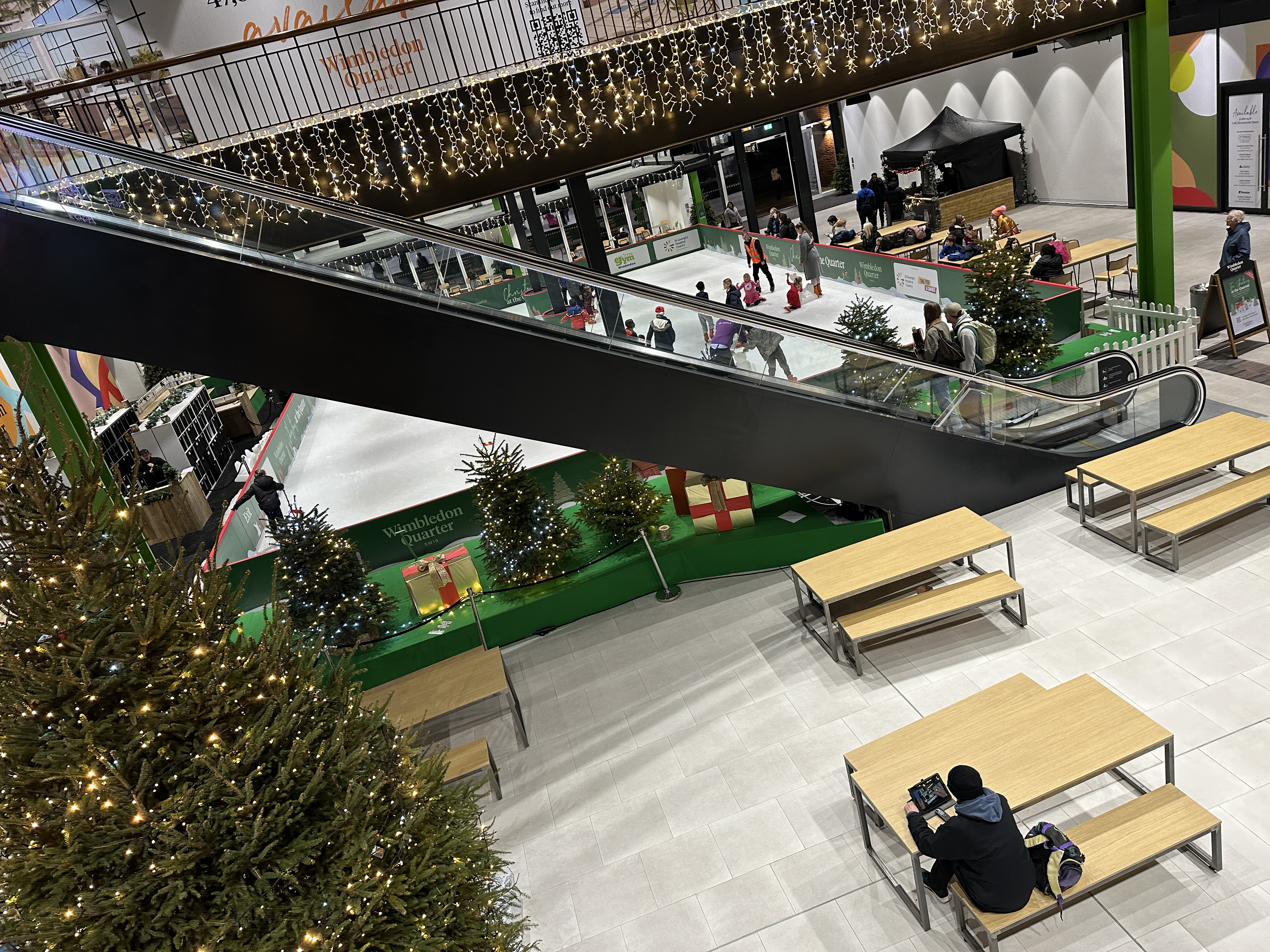
Interior to Wimbledon Quarter in Christmas 2024

Centre Court reopened as Wimbledon Quarter in 2023. The redeveloped complex was criticised by residents, calling it "empty" and "eerie".

The Debenhams unit was split, mostly becoming home to lifestyle units such as Affidea Healthcare, a Third Space luxury gym and others. Fashion retailer Primark intends to open in part of the unit in around 2026 or 2027, being their first London store in a decade.

== Stores ==
The anchor tenant of the complex is Primark (opening in 2026–2027) with stores such as Marks & Spencer, Oliver Bonas, Hotel Chocolat and Holland & Barrett. It features many office units with its most prominent being occupied by Iglu.com and Nineteen Group.
