= Søstrene Grene =

Danish retail chain

Søstrene Grene Import A/S
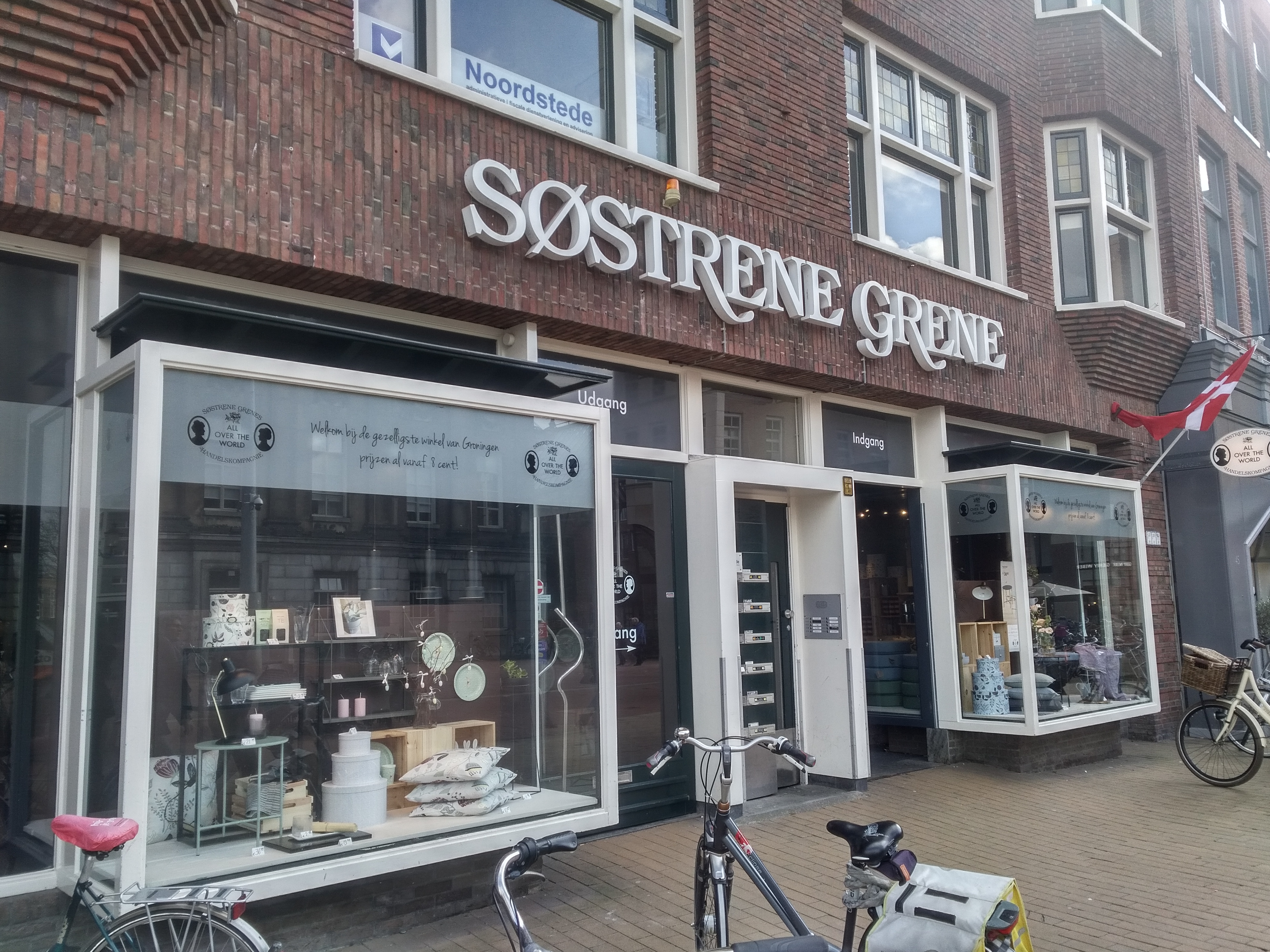
- A Søstrene Grene shop in the city of Groningen, Netherlands
- Trade name: Søstrene Grene
- Type: Private
- Industry: Retail
- Founded: 1973
- Founder: Inger Grene; Knud Cresten Vaupell Olsen
- Headquarters: Aarhus, Denmark
- Area served: Austria; Belgium; Denmark; Faroe Islands; Finland; France; Germany; Iceland; Ireland; Netherlands; Norway; Poland; Spain; Sweden; Switzerland; United Kingdom
- Key people: Mikkel Grene (CEO and co-owner); Cresten Grene (creative director and co-owner)
- Products: Interior decor; gifts; stationery; furniture
- Net income: 34.5 million krone (2015)
- Subsidiaries: SG Northern England Ltd
- Website: sostrenegrene.com

Søstrene Grene (Note: "Grene" is the family name of the founders, a husband-and-wife team, and does not mean "green". The two "sisters" in the company name and store signs are fictional.) (Danish pronunciation: [ˈsøstʁɐ̯nə ˈkʁæːnə]) is a family-owned Danish multi-category retail chain. It was founded in Aarhus, Denmark in 1973 by married team Inger Grene and Knud Cresten Vaupell Olsen.

'Søstrene Grene' is Danish for 'the Grene sisters'. The Grene family still owns and runs the chain today, with the founders' children Mikkel Grene becoming the CEO and Cresten Grene becoming the creative director in 2012.

== Concept ==
The location of the first store was up some stairs on the first floor. The concept comes from Inger and Knud wanting to do something unique to attract customers up the stairs.

Søstrene Grene stores have a maze layout with a course that carries customers through all their product categories, leading them to return to the checkouts at the front of the store. The stores use strategic spotlighting and dark walls to create a cosy atmosphere and play classical music to create a sense of calm.

Their product selections include homeware (such as furniture, kitchenware, lighting, bathroom accessories), crafts, gardening, gifting supplies, stationery, travel accessories, children's games and toys, and snacks. New products are released weekly and available for a short time creating an experience of discovery and uniqueness. Products have a focus on Scandinavian design, many with floral elements, while also being low cost. All products are exclusive to Søstrene Grene with the exception of some snacks and online-only exclusive items.

The concept could be compared to Danish variety store chains Flying Tiger and Normal as they also offer a large varied selection of products at affordable, competitive prices in stores with a maze layout. However, Søstrene Grene has a greater focus on design and lifestyle branding. In comparison, Flying Tiger has more gimmick products and private-label food and personal care products, and Normal is known more for bargain-priced food and personal care products by national brands.

== Stores ==
The first Søstrene Grene store opened in 1973 on the first floor of Søndergade 11 in Aarhus. The chain expanded with stores in Aalborg and Herning in 1989, and the expansion continued throughout the 90s and 00s. In 2005, the chain opened in Reykjavík in Iceland, while the stores in Stavanger, Norway, and Malmö, Sweden, opened in 2006.

The company moved its headquarters to Aarhus Docklands in April 2017 and is now present in 16 different markets. It previously had stores in Spain and Japan but the concept was found to be not as successful due to differences in lifestyle and shopping habits.

Country	Number of stores (2026)
Austria	7
Belgium	10
Denmark	53
Faroe Islands	1
Finland	6
France	43
Germany	106
Iceland	2
Ireland	5
Italy	2
Netherlands	20
Norway	43
Poland	3
Sweden	19
Switzerland	22
United Kingdom	76

=== United Kingdom ===
Søstrene Grene entered the United Kingdom in 2016 with a store in Nottingham and over the years expanded across the north of England and Northern Ireland. Since 2023, it has been undergoing a rapid expansion in the UK, opening its first Scotland store in Glasgow and its first London store in Southside Wandsworth shopping centre. That same year, it opened a flagship store – one of the biggest outside Denmark – on Tottenham Court Road.

In March 2025, Søstrene Grene opened its "global flagship" store in Argyll Street, just off of Oxford Street.

In the UK, Søstrene Grene operates legally as 'SG Northern England Ltd' but the company is still referred to as Søstrene Grene.

=== Online store ===
The company's online store has regional versions for each country where it is present, except the Faroe Islands.
