= Wimbledon, London =

Town in England, United Kingdom

Coordinates: 51.4237°N 0.2056°W

Wimbledon
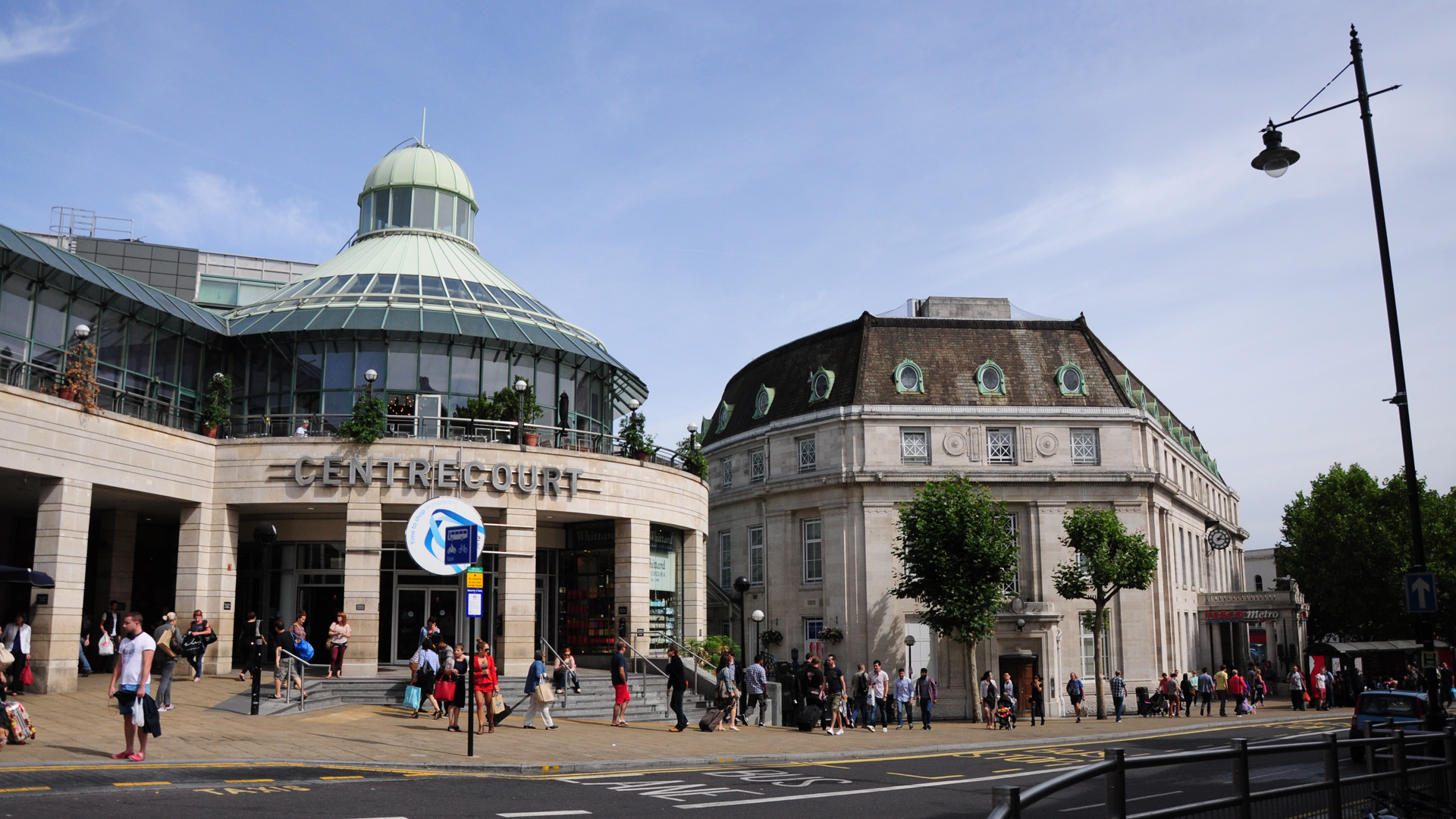
- Wimbledon town centre

- Location within Greater London
- Population: 68,187 (2011 Census)
- OS grid reference: TQ239709
- London borough: Merton
- Ceremonial county: Greater London
- Region: London
- Country: England
- Sovereign state: United Kingdom
- Post town: LONDON
- Postcode district: SW18 (part), SW19 and SW20
- Dialling code: 020
- Police: Metropolitan
- Fire: London
- Ambulance: London
- UK Parliament: Wimbledon
- London Assembly: Merton and Wandsworth

Wimbledon (/ˈwɪmbəldən/) is a suburb of southwest London, England, 7.0 miles (11.3 km) southwest of Charing Cross; it is the main commercial centre of the London Borough of Merton. Wimbledon had a population of 68,189 in 2011 which includes the electoral wards of Abbey, Wimbledon Town and Dundonald, Hillside, Wandle, Village, Raynes Park and Wimbledon Park.

It is home to the Wimbledon Championships and New Wimbledon Theatre, and contains Wimbledon Common, one of the largest areas of common land in London. The residential and retail area is split into two sections known as the "village" and the "town", with the High Street being the rebuilding of the original medieval village, and the "town" having first developed gradually after the building of the railway station in 1838.

Wimbledon has been inhabited since at least the Iron Age when the hill fort on Wimbledon Common is thought to have been constructed. In 1086 when the Domesday Book was compiled, Wimbledon was part of the manor of Mortlake. The ownership of the manor of Wimbledon changed between various wealthy families many times during its history, and the area also attracted other wealthy families who built large houses such as Eagle House, Wimbledon Manor House and Warren House.

The village developed with a stable rural population coexisting with nobility and wealthy merchants from the city. In the 18th century the Dog and Fox public house became a stop on the stagecoach run from London to Portsmouth, then in 1838 the London and South Western Railway (L&SWR) opened a station to the southeast of the village at the bottom of Wimbledon Hill. The location of the station shifted the focus of the town's subsequent growth away from the original village centre.

Wimbledon was a municipal borough in the county of Surrey from 1905 to 1965, when it became part of the London Borough of Merton as part of the creation of Greater London.

Wimbledon has established minority groups; among the prominent ones being British Asians (mainly British Pakistanis and British Sri Lankans), British Ghanaians, Poles and Irish people.

Nearby major settlements include Morden, Mitcham, Colliers Wood, Raynes Park, Roehampton, Southfields, Putney, Wimbledon Chase, Merton Park, New Malden and South Wimbledon.

== History ==
=== Early history ===
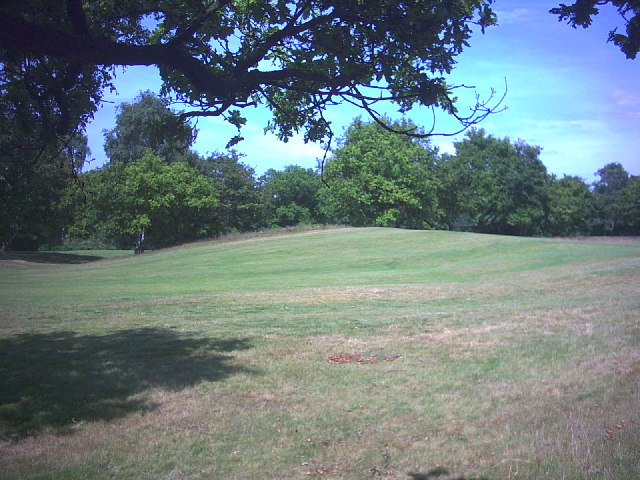
Remains of the ditch between the two main ramparts of the Iron Age hill fort

Wimbledon has been inhabited since at least the Iron Age when the hill fort on Wimbledon Common, the second-largest in London, is thought to have been constructed. The original nucleus of Wimbledon was at the top of the hill close to the common – the area now known locally as "the village".

The village is referred to as "Wimbedounyng" in a charter signed by King Edgar the Peaceful in 967. The name Wimbledon means "Wynnman's hill", with the final element of the name being the Celtic "dun" (hill). The name is shown on J. Cary's 1786 map of the London area as "Wimbleton", and the current spelling appears to have been settled on relatively recently in the early 19th century, the last in a long line of variations.

At the time the Domesday Book was compiled (around 1086), Wimbledon was part of the manor of Mortlake, and so was not recorded. The ownership of the manor of Wimbledon changed hands many times during its history. The manor was held by the church until 1398 when Thomas Arundel, Archbishop of Canterbury fell out of favour with Richard II and was exiled. The manor was confiscated and became crown property.

The manor remained crown property until the reign of Henry VIII when it was granted briefly to Thomas Cromwell, Earl of Essex, until Cromwell was executed in 1540 and the land was again confiscated. The manor was next held by Henry VIII's last wife and widow Catherine Parr until her death in 1548 when it again reverted to the monarch.

In the 1550s, Henry's daughter, Mary I, granted the manor to Cardinal Reginald Pole who held it until his death in 1558 when it once again become royal property. Mary's sister, Elizabeth I held the property until 1574 when she gave the manor house (but not the manor) to Christopher Hatton, who sold it in the same year to Sir Thomas Cecil, Earl of Exeter. The lands of the manor were given to the Cecil family in 1588 and a new manor house, Wimbledon Palace, was constructed and gardens laid out in the formal Elizabethan style.

=== 17th century ===
Wimbledon's proximity to the capital was beginning to attract other wealthy families. In 1613 Robert Bell, Master of the Worshipful Company of Girdlers and a director of the British East India Company built Eagle House as a home at an easy distance from London. The Cecil family retained the manor for fifty years, before it was bought by Charles I in 1638 for his Queen, Henrietta Maria.

Following the King's execution in 1649, the manor passed rapidly among various parliamentarian owners, including the Leeds Member of Parliament (MP) Adam Baynes and the civil war general John Lambert; Lambert drafted the Instrument of Government, the founding document of the Protectorate, at Wimbledon. After the restoration of the monarchy in 1660, it was returned to Henrietta Maria (now as mother of the new King, Charles II).

The Dowager Queen sold the manor in 1661 to George Digby, 2nd Earl of Bristol, who employed John Evelyn to improve and update the landscape in accordance with the latest fashions, including grottos and fountains. After his death in 1677, the manor was sold again to the Lord High Treasurer, Thomas Osborne, Earl of Danby.

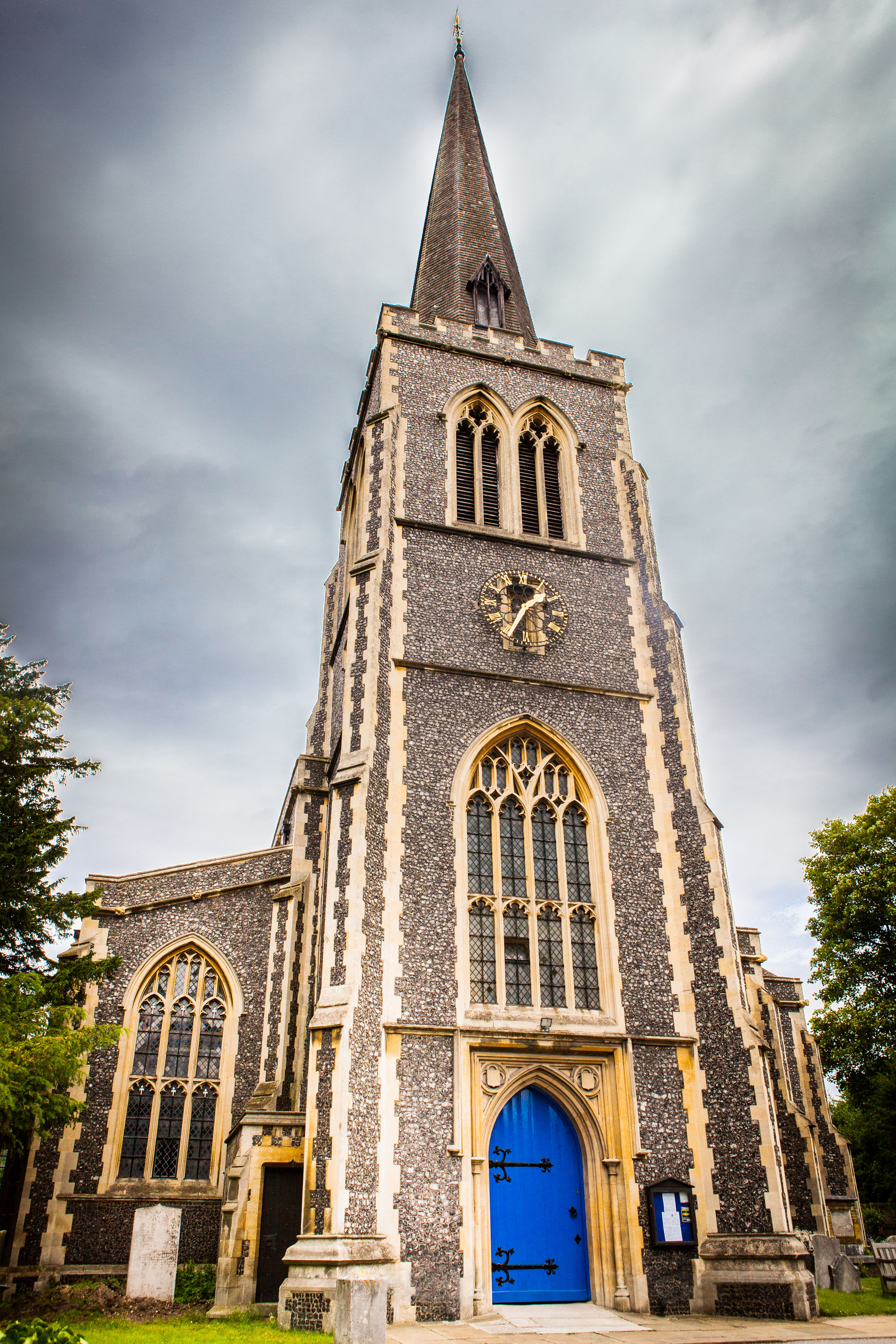
St Mary's Church

=== 18th century ===
The Osborne family sold the manor to Sir Theodore Janssen in 1712. Janssen, a director of the South Sea Company, began a new house to replace the one built by the Cecils, but the spectacular collapse of the company meant it was never finished.

The next owner was Sarah Churchill, Duchess of Marlborough, who increased the land belonging to the manor and completed the construction of a house to replace Jansen's unfinished effort in 1736. On her death in 1744, the property passed to her grandson, John Spencer, and subsequently to the first Earl Spencer.

The village continued to grow and the 18th-century introduction of stagecoach services from the Dog and Fox made the journey to London routine, although not without the risk of being held-up by highwaymen, such as Jerry Abershawe on the Portsmouth Road. The stagecoach horses would be stabled at the rear of the pub in what are now named Wimbledon Village Stables.

The 1735 manor house burnt down in the 1780s and was replaced in 1801 by Wimbledon Park House, built by the second Earl. At the time the manor estate included Wimbledon Common (as a heath) and the enclosed parkland around the manor house. Its area corresponded to the modern Wimbledon Park. The house stood east of St Mary's church.

Wimbledon House, a separate residence close to the village at the south end of Parkside (near Peek Crescent), was home in the 1790s to the exiled French statesman Vicomte de Calonne, and later to the mother of the writer Frederick Marryat. Their association with the area is recorded in the names of nearby Calonne and Marryat roads. Directly south of the common, the early 18th-century Warren House (Cannizaro House from 1841) was home to a series of grand residents.

=== 19th-century development ===
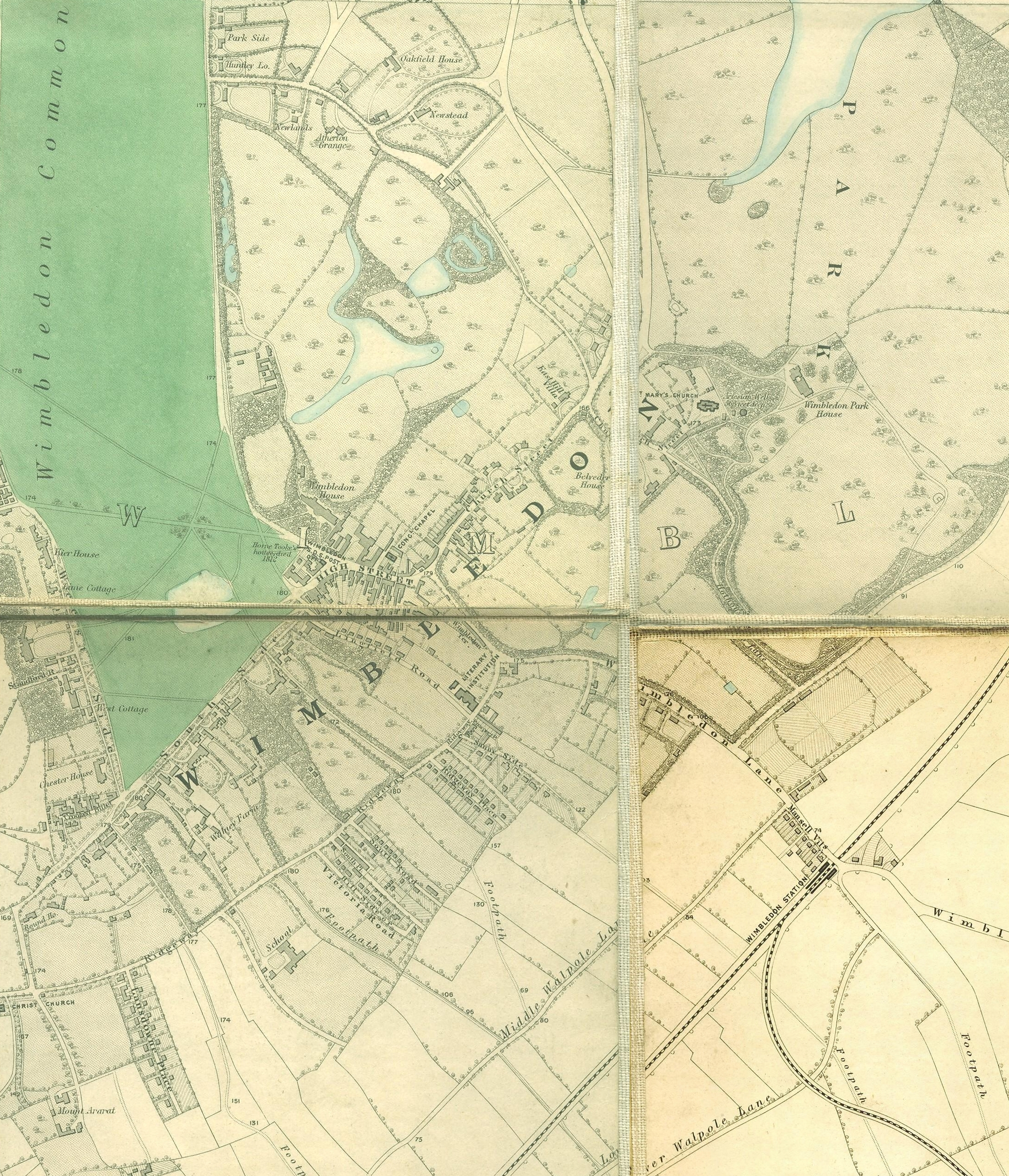
Wimbledon section of Edward Stanford's 1871 map of London

The first decades of the 19th century were relatively quiet for Wimbledon, with a stable rural population coexisting alongside nobility and wealthy merchants from the city. Renewed upheaval came in 1838, when the opening of the London and South Western Railway (L&SWR) brought a station to the south-east of the village, at the bottom of Wimbledon Hill. The location of the station shifted the focus of the town's subsequent growth away from the original village centre.

For several years Wimbledon Park was leased to the Duke of Somerset, who briefly in the 1820s employed a young Joseph Paxton as one of his gardeners, but in the 1840s the Spencer family sold the park off as building land. A period of residential development began with large detached houses in the north of the park. In 1864, the Spencers attempted to get parliamentary permission to enclose the common as a new park with a house and gardens and to sell part for building. Following an enquiry, permission was refused and a board of conservators was established in 1871 to take ownership of the common and preserve it in its natural condition.

In the second half of the century, Wimbledon experienced a very rapid expansion of its population. From under 2,700 residents recorded in the 1851 census, the population grew by a minimum of 60 per cent each decade up to 1901, to increase fifteen-fold in fifty years. Large numbers of villas and terraced houses were built along the roads from the centre towards neighbouring Putney, Merton Park and Raynes Park.

Transport links improved further with railway lines to Croydon (Wimbledon and Croydon Railway, opened in 1855) and Tooting (Tooting, Merton and Wimbledon Railway, opened in 1868). The District Railway (now the London Underground District line) extended its service over new tracks from Putney in 1889.

The commercial and civic development of the town also accelerated. Ely's department store opened in 1876 and shops began to stretch along Broadway towards Merton. Wimbledon built its first police station in 1870. Cultural developments included a Literary Institute by the early 1860s and the opening of Wimbledon Library in 1887. The religious needs of the growing population led to an Anglican church-building programme, starting with the rebuilding of St Mary's Church in 1849 and the construction of Christ Church (1859) and Trinity Church (1862).

Street names reflect events: Denmark Road, Denmark Avenue and the Alexandra pub on Wimbledon Hill mark the marriage of Edward, Prince of Wales, to Princess Alexandra of Denmark.

The change of character of Wimbledon from village to small town was recognised under the Local Government Act 1894, which formed Wimbledon Urban District with an elected council.

=== Modern history ===
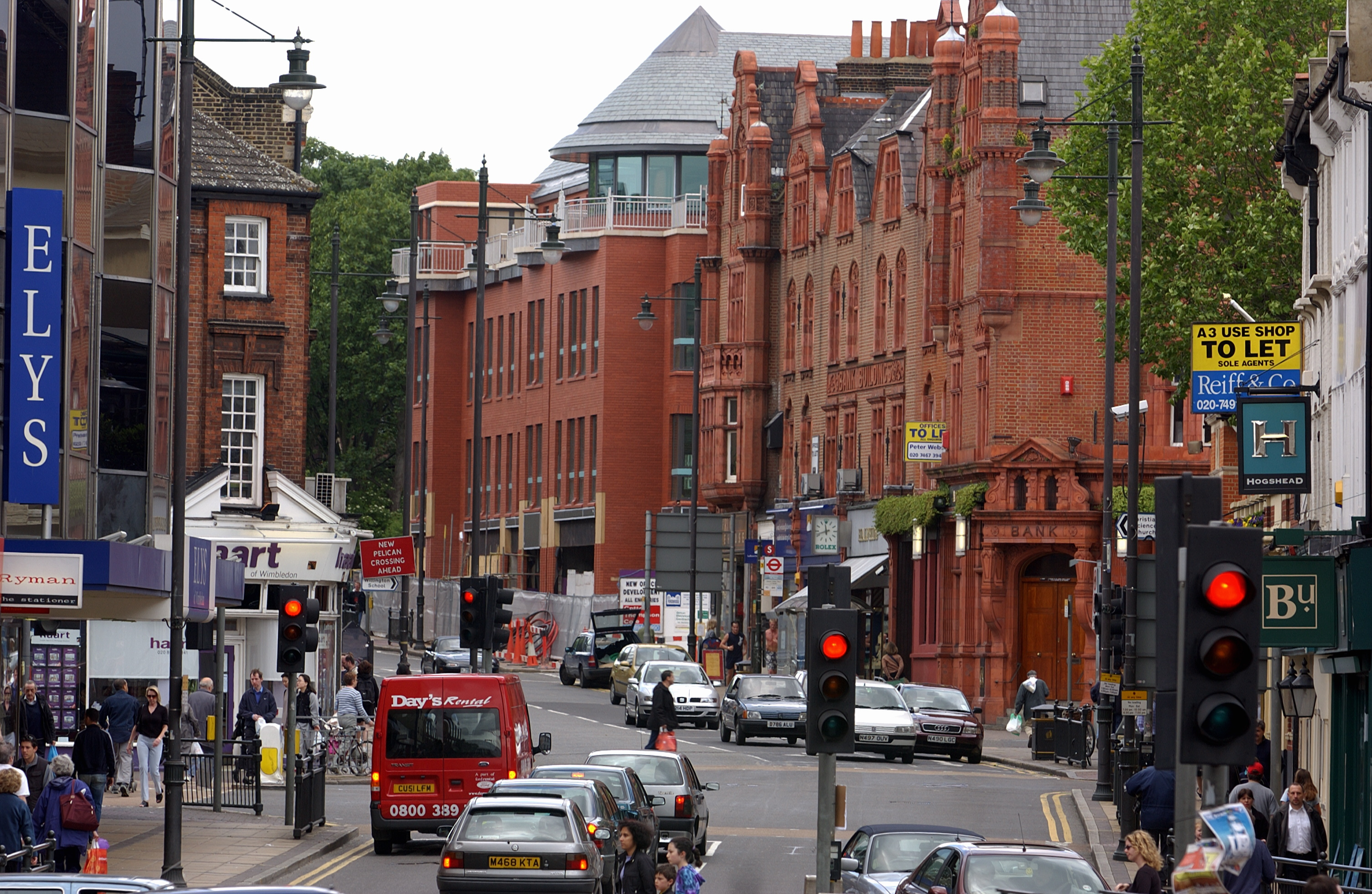
Wimbledon Hill Road, looking north-west from Wimbledon Bridge

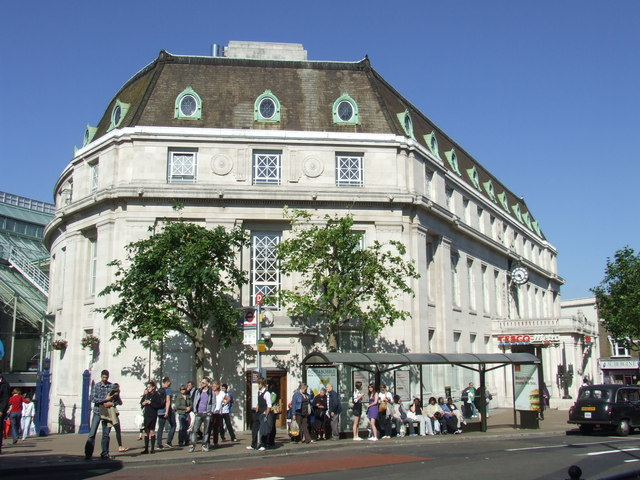
Wimbledon Town Hall, now a shopping centre

Wimbledon's population continued to grow in the early 20th century, as was recognised in 1905, when the urban district was incorporated as the Municipal Borough of Wimbledon, with the power to select a mayor.

By 1910, Wimbledon had established the beginnings of the Wimbledon School of Art at the Gladstone Road Technical Institute and acquired its first cinema and the theatre. Unusually, the facilities at its opening included Victorian-style Turkish baths.

By the 1930s, residential expansion had peaked in Wimbledon and the new focus for local growth had moved to neighbouring Morden, which had remained rural until the arrival of the Underground at Morden station in 1926. Wimbledon station was rebuilt by the Southern Railway with a simple Portland stone facade for the opening of a new railway branch line from Wimbledon to Sutton in 1930.

In 1931, the council built a new red brick and Portland stone Town Hall next to the station, on the corner of Queen's Road and Wimbledon Bridge. The architects were Bradshaw Gass & Hope.

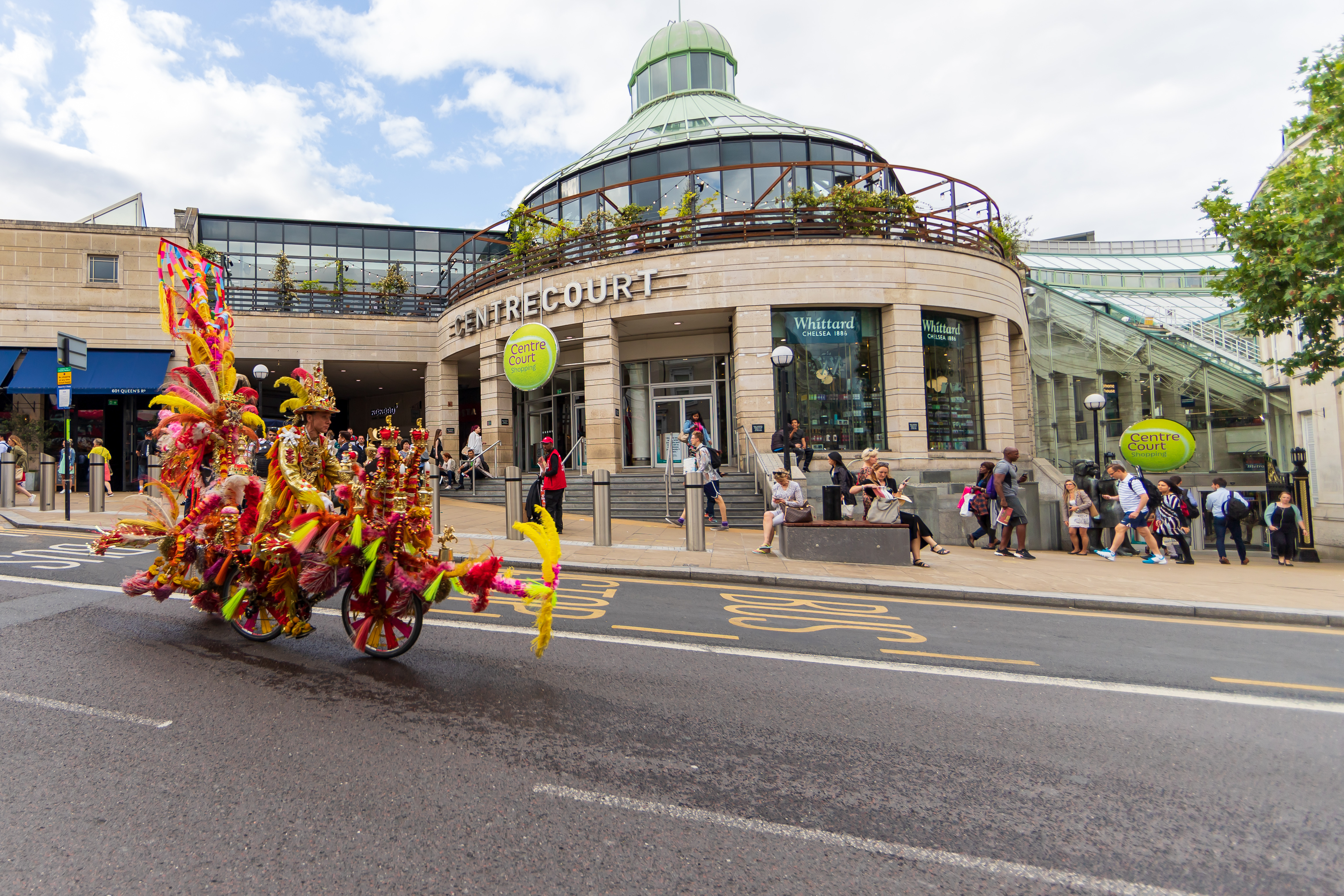
Centre Court Shopping Centre

Damage to housing stock in Wimbledon and other parts of London during World War II led to a final major building phase when many earlier Victorian houses with large grounds in Wimbledon Park were sub-divided into flats or demolished and replaced with apartment blocks. Other parts of Wimbledon Park, which had previously escaped being built upon, saw local authority estates constructed by the borough council, to house some of those who had lost their homes.

During the 1970s and 1980s, Wimbledon town centre struggled to compete commercially with more developed centres at Kingston and Sutton. Part of the problem was the shortage of locations for large anchor stores to attract customers. After some years in which the council seemed unable to find a solution, The Centre Court shopping centre was developed on land next to the station, providing a much-needed focus, and opened in 1990. The shopping centre incorporated the old town hall building. A new portico, in keeping with the old work, was designed by Sir George Grenfell-Baines, who had worked on the original designs over fifty years before.

== Geography ==
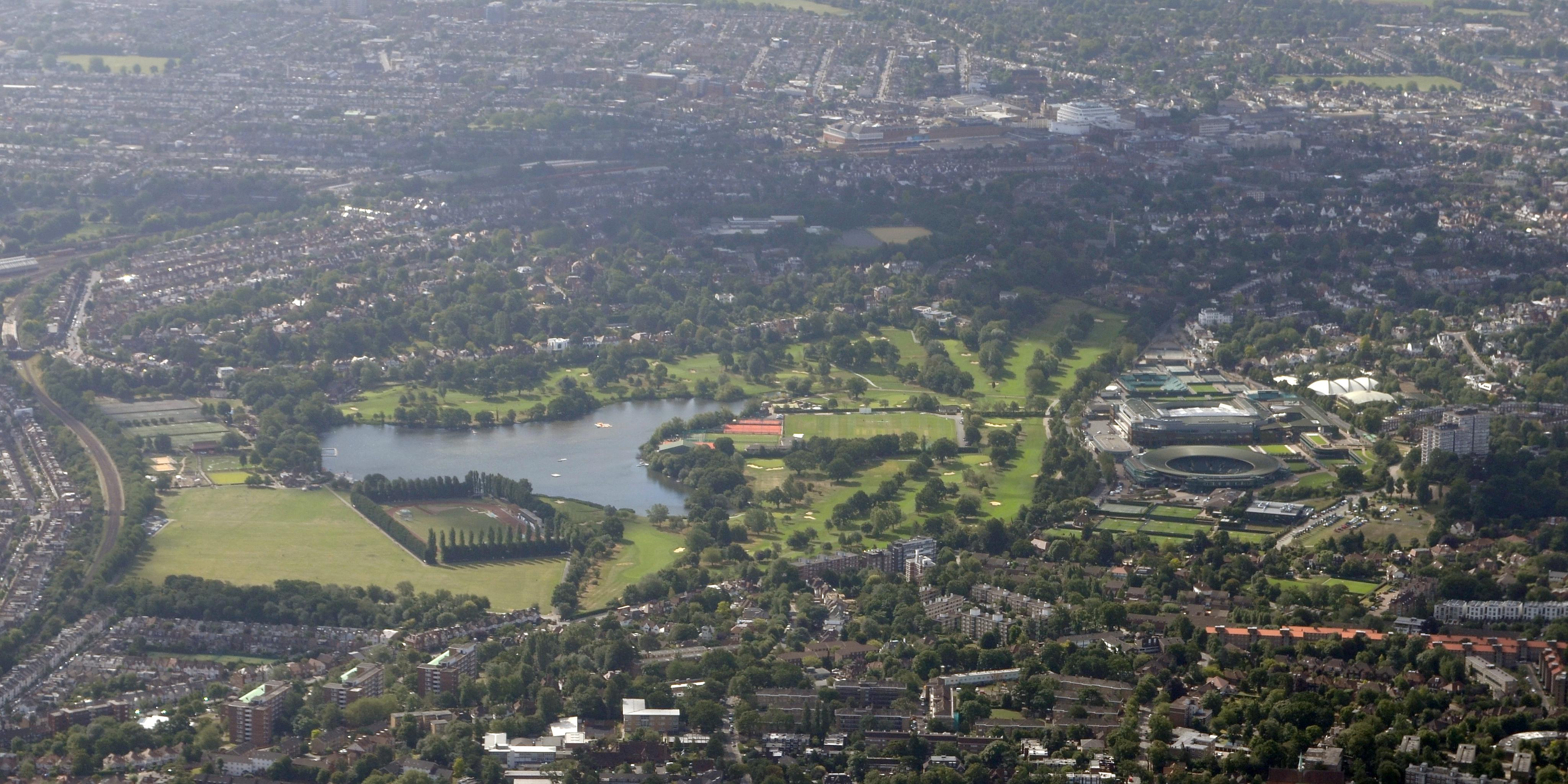
Aerial view of Wimbledon from the north in August 2015, with Wimbledon Park (left) and the All-England Club, the venue for the Wimbledon Championships (right)

Wimbledon lies in the south-west area of London, three miles (4.8 km) south of Wandsworth, two miles (3.2 km) south-west of Tooting, three miles northwest of Mitcham, four miles (6.4 km) north of Sutton and 3.5 miles (5.6 km) east of Kingston upon Thames, in Greater London. It is 7 miles (11.3 km) south-west of Charing Cross. The area is identified in the London Plan as one of 35 major centres in Greater London.

It is considered an affluent suburb with its grand Victorian houses, modern housing and low-rise apartments. The residential area splits into two sections: the village and the town, with the village near the common centred on the High Street, being part of the original medieval village, and now a prime residential area of London commanding high prices, and the "town" being part of the modern development, centred on The Broadway, since the building of the railway station in 1838.

The majority of the adult population of around 68,200 adults belong to the ABC1 social group. The population grew from around 1,000 at the start of the 19th century to around 55,000 in 1911, a figure which has remained reasonably stable since.

== Demography ==
Wimbledon is covered by several wards in the London Borough of Merton, making it difficult to produce statistics for the town as a whole.

The largest ethnic groups (up to 10%) in the wards according to the 2011 census are:

- Village (northern areas and the village): 65% White British, 16% Other White
- Wimbledon Park (north-east): 60% White British, 18% Other White
- Hillside (west of centre): 56% White British, 20% Other White
- Dundonald (south of centre): 61% White British, 18% Other White
- Raynes Park (west of centre): 61% White British, 16% Other White
- Trinity (east from centre): 56% White British, 18% Other White

== Governance and representation ==
At the time the Domesday Book was compiled (around 1086), Wimbledon was part of the manor of Mortlake. From 1328 to 1536, a manor of Wimbledon was recorded as belonging to the Archbishop of Canterbury.

The manor of Wimbledon changed hands many times during its history. Wimbledon was an Ancient Parish from the medieval period, later being re-organised as the Municipal Borough of Wimbledon within the county of Surrey.

In 1965, the London Government Act 1963 abolished the Municipal Borough of Wimbledon, Merton and Morden Urban District and the Municipal Borough of Mitcham, creating instead the London Borough of Merton. Initially, the new administrative centre was at Wimbledon Town Hall, but it moved to the 14-storey Crown House in Morden in the early 1990s.

It is now the Parliamentary constituency of Wimbledon, and since 2024 has been represented by Paul Kohler, a Liberal Democrat MP.

Wimbledon is part of the Wimbledon Town and Dundonald ward for elections to Merton London Borough Council.

== Economy ==
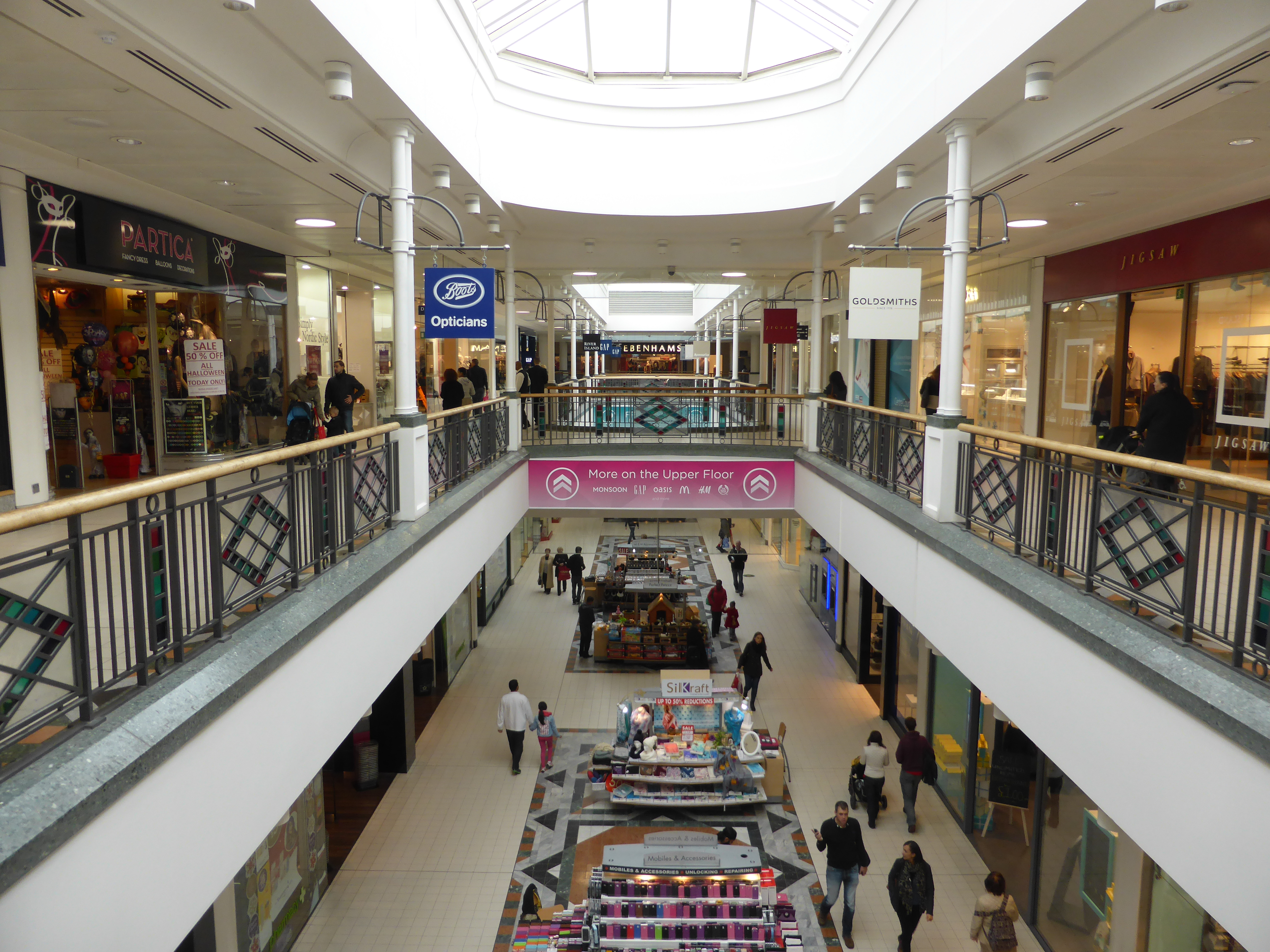
Inside the Centre Court shopping centre

In 2012 the businesses in Wimbledon voted to introduce a Business Improvement District. "Love Wimbledon" was formed in April 2012, funded and managed by the business community to promote and enhance the town centre. Those who work within Wimbledon can apply for a 'Privilege Card' which provides discounts and benefits within the town centre.

The UK's leading car-sharing company Zipcar has its UK headquarters in Wimbledon. Other notable organisations with head offices in Wimbledon include CIPD, Ipsotek, United Response, the Communication Workers Union (United Kingdom) and, until 2022, Lidl.

== Media ==
The Wimbledon Times (formerly Wimbledon Guardian) provides local news in print and online.

== The Tennis Championships ==
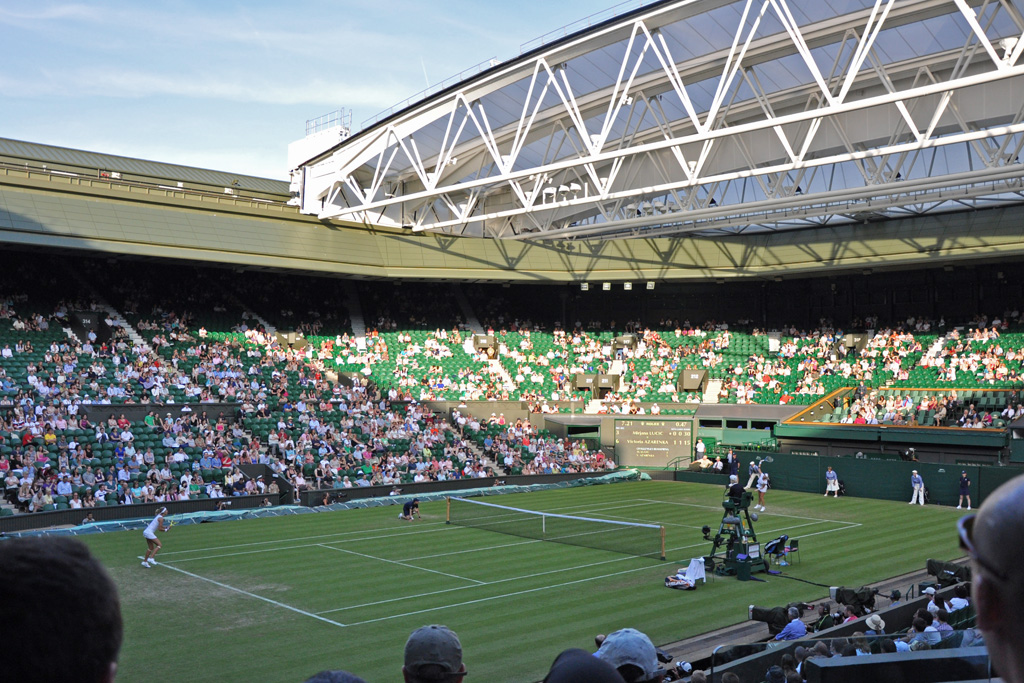
2010 Wimbledon Championships

In the 1870s, at the bottom of the hill on land between the railway line and Worple Road, the All-England Croquet Club had begun to hold its annual championships. But the popularity of croquet was waning as the new sport of lawn tennis began to spread, and after initially setting aside just one of its lawns for tennis, the club decided to hold its first Lawn Tennis Championship in July 1877. By 1922, the popularity of tennis had grown to the extent that the club's small ground could no longer cope with the numbers of spectators and the renamed All England Lawn Tennis and Croquet Club moved to new grounds close to Wimbledon Park.

Wimbledon historian Richard Milward recounts how King George V opened the new courts. "He (the king) gave three blows on a gong, the tarpaulins were removed, the first match started – and the rain came down." The club's old grounds continue to be used as the sports ground for Wimbledon High School.

== Sport ==
=== Horse riding ===
Wimbledon Village Stables is the oldest recorded riding stables in England. The late Richard Milward MA, a local historian, researched the background of horses in Wimbledon over the years and found that the first recorded stables belonged to the Lord of the Manor, and are detailed in the Estate's accounts of 1236–37. Stables on the current site, behind the Dog & Fox pub in the High Street, were founded in 1915 by William Kirkpatrick and named Hilcote Stables; William's daughter Jean took over on his retirement and continued to visit the stables until her death in 2005. From 1969 Hilcote Stables were leased to Colin Crawford, and when they came up for sale in 1980 renamed Wimbledon Village Stables. It is now approved by the British Horse Society and the Association of British Riding Schools. It offers horse-riding lessons and hacks on Wimbledon Common and in Richmond Park.

=== Horse racing ===
In 1792 the Rev. Daniel Lysons published The Environs of London: being a historical account of the towns, villages, and hamlets, within twelve miles of that capital in which he wrote: "In the early part of the present century there were annual races upon this common, which had then a King's plate." However, he gives no further details and does not say how successful horse racing was or how long it lasted.

=== Rifle shooting ===
In the 1860s, the newly formed National Rifle Association held its first competition - the "Imperial Meeting" - on Wimbledon Common. The association and the annual competition grew rapidly and by the early 1870s, rifle ranges were established on the common. In 1878 the competitions were lasting two weeks and attracting nearly 2,500 competitors, housed in temporary camps set up across the common. By the 1880s, however, the power and range of rifles had advanced to the extent that shooting in an increasingly populated area was no longer considered safe. The last meeting was held in 1889 before the NRA moved to Bisley in Surrey.

Wimbledon, a small farming locality in New Zealand, was named after this district in the 1880s after a local resident shot a bullock from a considerable distance away. The shot was considered by onlookers to be worthy of the rifle-shooting championships held in Wimbledon at the time.

The Wimbledon Cup trophy, first awarded in Wimbledon for high-power rifles in 1866, was presented to the American rifle team in 1875 and a century and a half later continued to be awarded by the National Rifle Association of America.

=== Football ===
From a small, long-established non-League team ,Wimbledon Football Club from 1977 rose through the ranks of the Football League structure; reaching the highest national professional league in 1986 and winning the FA Cup against Liverpool in 1988.

Wimbledon moved into a stadium at Plough Lane in 1912 and played there for 79 years until beginning a ground share with Crystal Palace at Selhurst Park near Croydon, as their progress through the Football League meant that redeveloping Plough Lane to the required modern standards was impractical. The stadium stood dormant for 10 years until it was finally demolished in 2001. A housing development now occupies the site.

AFC Wimbledon, the phoenix club founded to replace the departed team (see Milton Keynes Dons), played for a number of years in Kingston upon Thames; in 2020, however, they moved into a new stadium, again named Plough Lane, on the site of the former greyhound track and a short distance from its namesake.

=== Cricket ===
Wimbledon Cricket Club is based at The Wimbledon Club and also plays matches at Raynes Park Sports Ground.

=== Field hockey ===
There are a number of field hockey clubs in the area. Wimbledon Hockey Club competes in the Men's England Hockey League, the Women's England Hockey League and the South East Hockey League. Berrylands Hockey Club, Merton Hockey Club and Mitcham Ladies Hockey Club are also nearby and compete in the South East Hockey League.

=== Motorcycle speedway ===
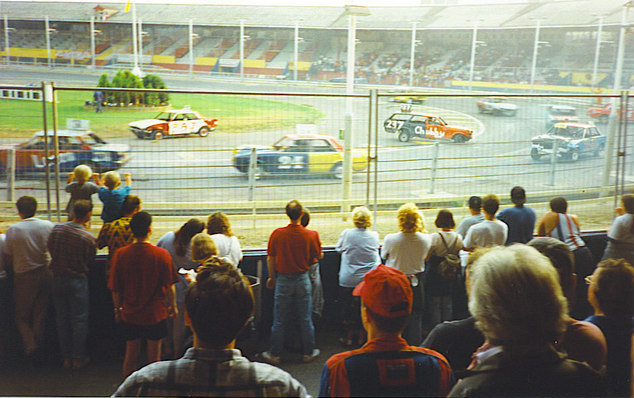
Stock car racing at Wimbledon Stadium

For many years Wimbledon Stadium hosted to Greyhound racing, as well as Stock car racing and motorcycle speedway. Speedway began at Wimbledon Stadium in 1928. The local team, the "Dons", was successful over the decades. It started out in 1929 as a member of the Southern League and operated until the Second World War. The track re-opened in 1946 and the Dons operated in the top flight for many years. In the 1950s the track was home to two World Champions: Ronnie Moore and Barry Briggs. In the Dons' last season, 2005, the team finished second in The National Conference League, but after the collapse of lease-renewal talks with the Greyhound Racing Association (owners of the stadium), the high increase in rent required meant the team was wound up. The stadium was demolished in 2017.

=== Running ===
There are two active running clubs in Wimbledon Park called Hercules Wimbledon and the Wimbledon Windmilers. Both clubs includes some top athletes as well as beginners. A Parkrun is held every Saturday morning. Prior to Parkrun, a similar event had been held as the Wimbledon Common Time Trial.

== Theatres ==
=== New Wimbledon Theatre ===
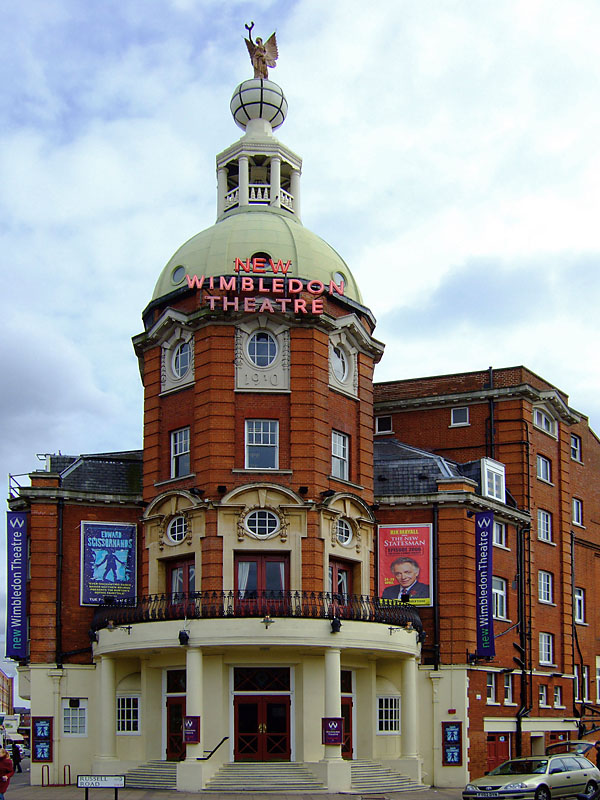
New Wimbledon Theatre

The New Wimbledon Theatre is a Grade II listed Edwardian theatre built by J. B. Mullholland as the Wimbledon Theatre, on the site of a large house with spacious grounds. The theatre was designed by Cecil Aubrey Masey and Roy Young (possibly after a 1908 design by Frank H Jones). It opened on 26 December 1910 with the pantomime Jack and Jill. The theatre was very popular between the wars, with appearances by Gracie Fields, Sybil Thorndike, Ivor Novello, Alicia Markova and Noël Coward. Lionel Bart's Oliver! and Half A Sixpence, starring Tommy Steele, received their world premières at the theatre in the 1960s, before transferring to the West End.

The theatre was saved from redevelopment by the Ambassador Theatre Group in 2004. With several refurbishments, notably in 1991 and 1998, it retains its baroque and Adamesque internal features. The golden statue on the dome depicts Laetitia, the Roman Goddess of Gaiety, and was an original fixture back in 1910. Laetitia is holding a laurel crown as a symbol of celebration. The statue was removed during World War II, as it was thought to be a direction finder for German bombers. It was eventually replaced in 1991.

=== Polka Children's Theatre ===
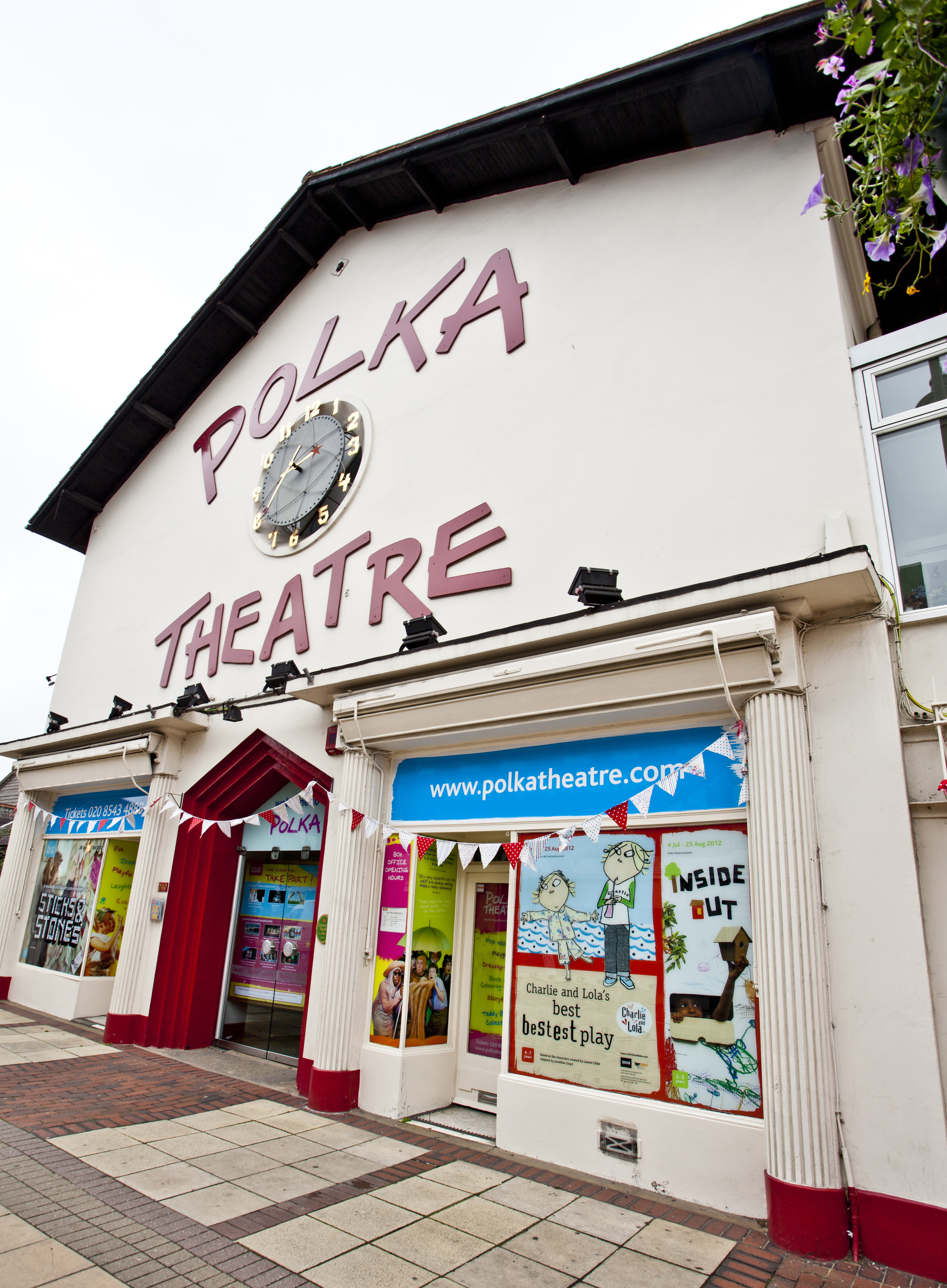
Polka Theatre, Wimbledon

The Polka Theatre is a children's theatre in Wimbledon, London Borough of Merton, for children up to 13. The theatre contains two performance spaces – a 300-seat main auditorium and a 70-seat studio dedicated to early-year performances. Polka also has a creative learning studio, a garden, an outdoor playground, an indoor play area, exhibition spaces, and a cafe. It is a producing theatre, which also tours shows nationally and internationally, and provides a range of education and community engagement programmes for children as a registered charity and an Arts Council England National Portfolio Organisation. It is also funded by the London Borough of Merton and a number of private charitable trusts and foundations, individuals and firms. The theatre (formerly the Holy Trinity Halls in Wimbledon) opened in November 1979.

== Transport ==
=== Rail ===
Wimbledon station serves the town centre and is part of Oyster Fare Zone 3. It is a terminus on the London Underground District line and the London Trams, and is also served by through trains on national rail operators South Western Railway and Thameslink. Other nearby stations include Wimbledon Chase on the Sutton Loop line, South Wimbledon on the Northern line, and Wimbledon Park, one stop from the main station on the District line.

National Rail service patterns in Wimbledon
Start	End	Operator	Other Info
London Waterloo	Dorking	South Western Railway	
London Waterloo	Epsom	South Western Railway	
London Waterloo	Guildford	South Western Railway	
London Waterloo	Richmond	South Western Railway	
London Waterloo	Hampton Court	South Western Railway	
London Waterloo	Shepperton	South Western Railway	
London Waterloo	Chessington South	South Western Railway	
Luton	Sutton	Thameslink	Peak Hours Only
Bedford	Sutton	Thameslink	Peak Hours Only
St Albans City	Sutton	Thameslink	

=== Bus ===
Wimbledon is served by London Buses routes 57, 93, 131, 156, 163, 164, 200, 219 and 493 and night bus N87.

The All England Lawn Tennis and Croquet Club is served regularly by London Buses route 493, as well as the privately-contracted route 840 from outside Wimbledon station during the Wimbledon Championships season.

== Literature ==
In literature, Wimbledon provides the principal setting for several comic novels by author Nigel Williams (including the best-selling The Wimbledon Poisoner and They Came from SW19), as well as for Elisabeth Beresford's series of children's stories about the Wombles.

Wimbledon was given as the site where the sixth Martian invasion cylinder landed in H. G. Wells' book The War of the Worlds and is mentioned briefly in the same author's The Time Machine and When the Sleeper Wakes.

Each October thousands attend the Wimbledon BookFest, which has been running since 2006. Over 60 events are held around Wimbledon, including at the Big Tent on the Common.

== Notable residents ==
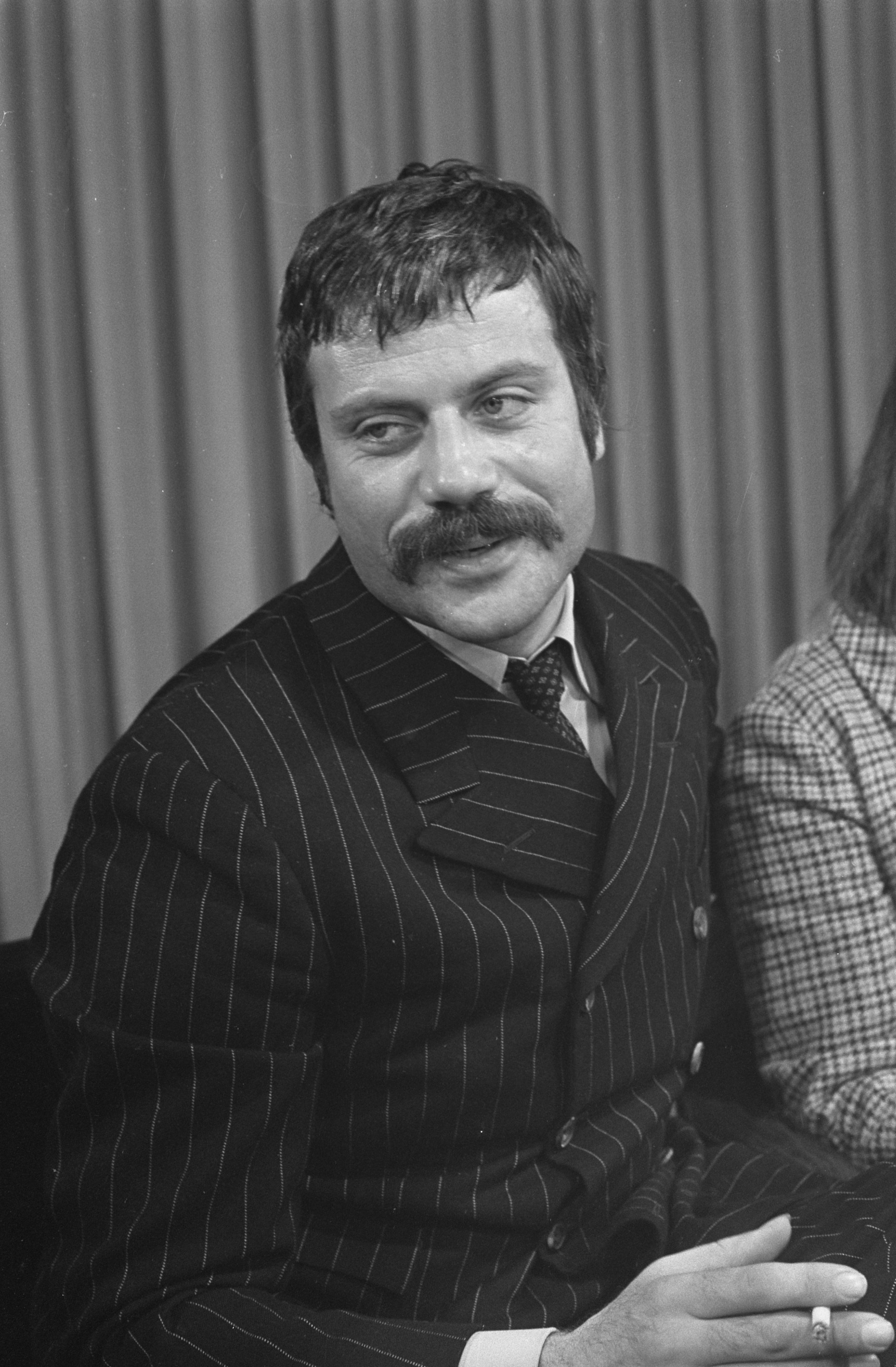
Oliver Reed, born 1938 in Wimbledon

- Bob Astles (1924–2012), former associate of Ugandan presidents Milton Obote and Idi Amin
- Walter Bagehot (1826-1877), journalist, editor of The Economist, author of The English Constitution which he worked on while living at 21 Westside Common.
- Ben Barnes (born 1981), actor
- Joseph Bazalgette (1819–1891), civil engineer; his creation in the mid 19th century of the sewer network for central London eliminated the incidence of cholera epidemics
- Richard Briers (1934-2013), actor.
- Raymond Briggs (1934–2022), cartoonist
- John Lyde-Brown (died 1787), director of the Bank of England; resident of Cannizaro House; his collection of classical sculpture was acquired by Catherine II of Russia in 1787 and is held by the Hermitage Museum
- James Brunlees (1816–1892), engineer, lived at Argyle Lodge, Parkside
- Josephine Butler (1828–1906), feminist campaigner of the Victorian era, Blue Plaque at 8 North View, Wimbledon Common
- George Edward Cates (1892–1917), World War I Victoria Cross recipient
- Duke (1784–1841) and Duchess of Cannizzaro
- Ernst Boris Chain (1906–1979), joint winner of the 1945 Nobel Prize in Medicine for the development of penicillin. Blue Plaque at 9 North View, Wimbledon Common
- Mavis Cheek (1948-2023), novelist born and brought up in Wimbledon.
- Sarah Churchill, Duchess of Marlborough (1660–1744), close friend of Queen Anne, resident of Wimbledon Manor House
- John Cloake (1924–2014), diplomat, historian and author, was born and brought up in Wimbledon, where he attended King's College School.
- Annette Crosbie (born 1934), actress, lives in Wimbledon. She plays the screen wife of One Foot in the Graves Victor Meldrew
- Allan Cunningham (1791–1839), botanist and explorer, born in Wimbledon.
- Richard Cunningham (1793–1835), brother of Allan Cunningham, botanist, born in Wimbledon. He became Colonial Botanist of New South Wales.
- Jack Davenport (born 1973), actor
- Sandy Denny (1947–1978), singer, born at the Nelson Hospital
- Laurence Doherty (1875–1919), winner of thirteen Wimbledon tennis championships and two Olympic gold medals
- Reginald Doherty (1872–1910), winner of twelve Wimbledon tennis championships and three Olympic gold medals
- Hugh Dowding (1882–1970), commander of RAF Fighter Command during the Battle of Britain in 1940, Blue Plaque at 3 St Mary's Road
- Henry Dundas, Viscount Melville (1742–1811), Home Secretary and Secretary of State for War to William Pitt the Younger, resident of Cannizaro House
- Maria Fetherstonhaugh (1847–1918), novelist, bought a house by Wimbledon Windmill in 1905, where Robert Baden-Powell as her guest wrote Scouting for Boys.
- Sid Field (1904–1950), English comedy actor, lived at 44 Parkside.
- Charles James Fox (1749–1806), Britain's first Foreign Secretary under prime minister Marquess of Rockingham; took over Rockingham's Church Road house after the latter's death in 1782
- Ford Madox Ford (1873–1939), author; works include The Good Soldier and Parade's End
- John William Godward (1861–1922), painter
- Charles Gore (1853-1932), born Wimbledon, theologian.
- Charles Patrick Graves (1899–1971), journalist
- Robert Graves (1895–1985), poet
- Victoria Hamilton (born 1971), actress
- George Hamilton-Gordon, 4th Earl of Aberdeen (1784–1860), prime minister 1852–55; resident of Cannizaro House
- Imogen Hassal (1942–1980), actress
- Ted Heath (1902–1969), bandleader
- Georgette Heyer (1902–1974), novelist born and raised in Wimbledon. She wrote her first five novels there. Two later novels, Pastel and Behold, Here's Poison, are set in a suburb very like Wimbledon.
- Mark Hollis (1955–2019), musician
- Leslie Hore-Belisha, 1st Baron Hore-Belisha (1893–1957), Minister of Transport, 1934–7 who introduced the driving test and the Belisha Beacon; then Secretary of State for War, 1937–40
- Thomas Hughes (1822–1896), author of the 1857 novel Tom Brown's Schooldays which was written in Wimbledon
- James Hunt (1947–1993), racing driver and commentator. Formula 1 World Champion 1976
- John Innes (1829–1904), property developer and philanthropist
- Sir Theodore Janssen of Wimbledon (c.1658–1748), director of the South Sea Company and founder-member of the Bank of England. Resident of Wimbledon Manor House. The grounds of his later house bordered the east side of the High Street.
- Paul Jerricho, actor
- Hetty King (1883–1972), music hall artiste and male impersonator. A blue commemorative plaque was erected on her home in Palmerston Road, Wimbledon by The Music Hall Guild of Great Britain and America in November 2010.
- Vanessa Kirby (born 1988), actress
- Don Lang (1925–1992), with his band, a mainstay of Britain's first television rock and roll programme Six-Five Special.
- Alvar Lidell (1908–1981), BBC radio announcer; his voice was well known during World War II
- Jenny Lind (1820–1887), the Swedish Nightingale, at Argyle Lodge, Parkside.
- Sir Joseph Norman Lockyer (1836–1920), scientist and astronomer; joint discoverer of helium
- James Murdoch (born 1972), younger son of media mogul Rupert Murdoch and former chief executive officer (CEO) of 21st Century Fox
- Frederick Marryat (1792–1848), author, Blue Plaque at Gothic Lodge, 6 Woodhayes Road
- Tony McGuinness (born 1959), guitarist and songwriter, Above and Beyond
- Michael McIntyre (born 1976), comedian born in the area
- Thomas Ralph Merton (1888–1969), physicist
- Marcus Mumford (born 1987), lead singer and songwriter, Mumford & Sons
- John Murray III (1808–1892), publisher; significant publications include Charles Darwin's The Origin of Species; Murray built a house called "Newstead" on four acres at Somerset Road.
- Pete Murray (born 1925), disc jockey
- Horatio, Viscount Nelson (1758–1805), admiral; Nelson's estate, Merton Place, included part of Wimbledon at the eastern end of the Broadway, though, strictly he was a resident of Merton the neighbouring parish
- Margaret Noble or Sister Nivedita (1867-1911), campaigner for Indian Independence
- Alan Pardew (born 1961), football manager
- Michelle Paver (born 1960), author, Chronicles of Ancient Darkness
- Charles Pepys, 1st Earl of Cottenham (1781–1851), Lord Chancellor; judge in the landmark 1841 court case Saunders v Vautier
- Sir William Henry Preece (1834–1913), developed English telephone system; Blue Plaque at Gothic Lodge, 6 Woodhayes Road.
- Oliver Reed (1938–1999), actor
- Margaret Rutherford (1892–1972), actress, Blue Plaque at 4 Berkeley Place
- Arthur Schopenhauer (1788–1860), philosopher, Blue Plaque at Eagle House where he lived in 1803
- Ridley Scott (born 1937), film director; films include Blade Runner and Gladiator.
- Haile Selassie I of Ethiopia (1892–1975), guest at a house in Parkside while in exile from Ethiopia owing to the Italian invasion; his statue stands in Cannizaro Park.
- Renu Setna, actor
- Brian Sewell (1931–2015), art critic and media personality
- Mark Edgley Smith (1955–2008), composer
- Steve-O (born 1974), entertainer, born in Wimbledon
- Jamie T (born 1986), musician
- David Tipper (born 1976), producer, composer, DJ
- John Horne Tooke (1736–1812), politician, lived at Chester House on Wimbledon Common
- Arnold Toynbee (1852–1883), economic historian who popularised the term "Industrial Revolution", Blue Plaque at 49 Wimbledon Parkside
- Joseph Toynbee (1815–1866), surgeon, Blue Plaque at 49 Wimbledon Parkside
- Ralph Tubbs (1912–1996), architect; his buildings include the Dome of Discovery and Charing Cross Hospital
- Keith Walker (1922–1989), cricketer
- Charles Watson-Wentworth, 2nd Marquess of Rockingham (1730–1782), twice Prime Minister. His Church Road house adjoined the grounds of Sir Theodore Janssen's and was previously occupied by a Mr Rush as shown on this map.
- Kemi Badenoch (1980), Leader of the Opposition and Conservative Party since 2024
- Dame June Whitfield (1925–2018), actress
- William Wilberforce (1759–1833), anti-slavery campaigner

== Amenities ==
=== Major public open spaces ===
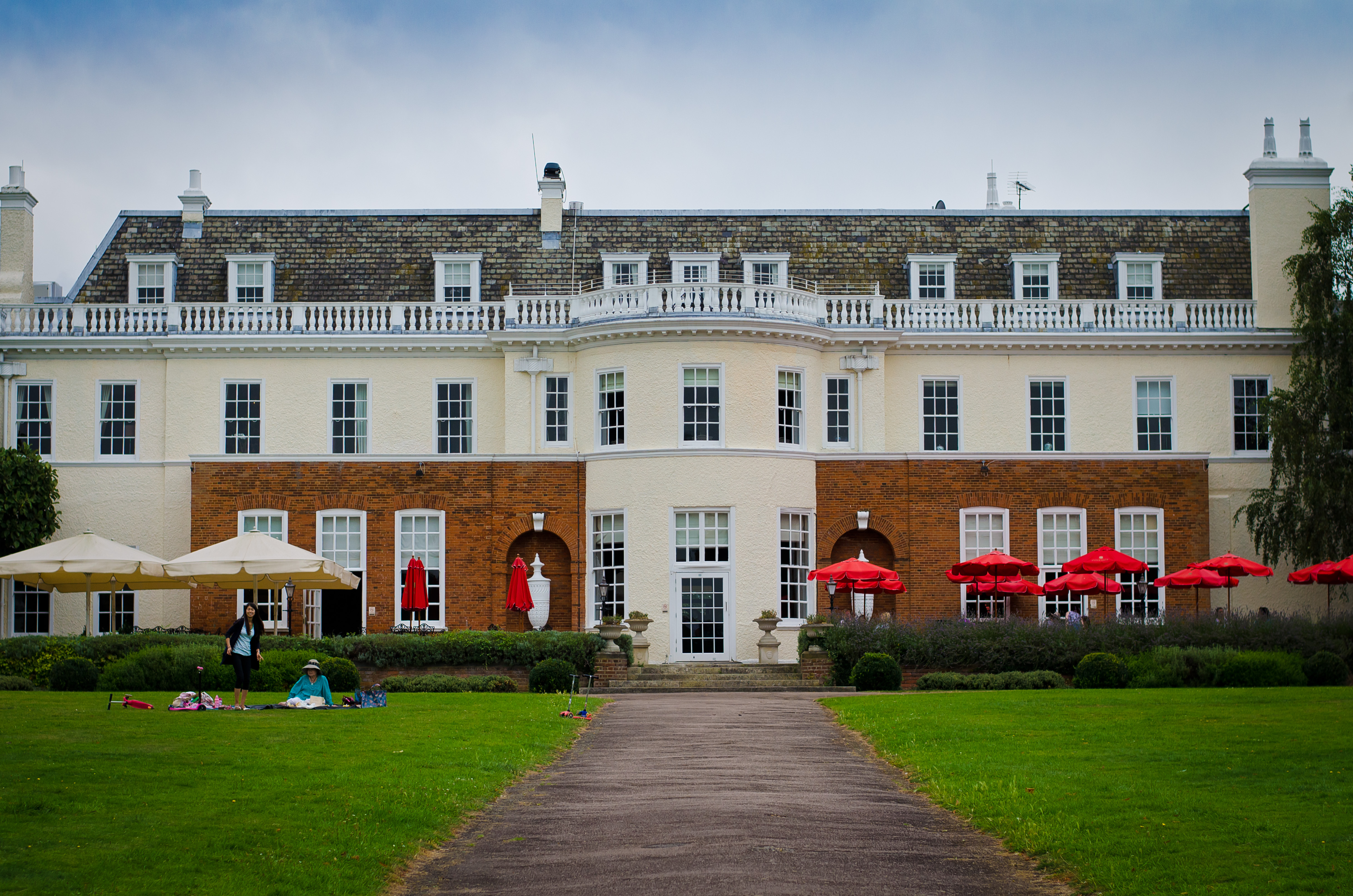
Cannizaro House, which overlooks the park of the same name

Wimbledon has a number of public parks including Cannizaro Park, South Park Gardens, Wimbledon Park and Wimbledon Common. The first three are listed, Cannizaro Park and Wimbledon Park at Grade II* and South Park Gardens at Grade II, on the Register of Historic Parks and Gardens of Special Historic Interest in England.

=== Museums ===
- Southside House
- Wimbledon Lawn Tennis Museum
- Wimbledon Museum
- Wimbledon Windmill

=== Schools ===
==== Secondary ====
- Ricards Lodge High School, Lake Road, Wimbledon (girls)
- Rutlish School, Watery Lane, Merton Park (boys)
- Ursuline High School, Crescent Road, Wimbledon (RC, girls)
- Wimbledon College, Edge Hill, Wimbledon (RC, boys)
- Wimbledon High School, Mansel Road, Wimbledon (girls)

==== Primary ====
- Dundonald Primary School
- Garfield Primary school (Mixed) Garfield road, Wimbledon
- Hollymount Primary School (Mixed), Cambridge Road, West Wimbledon
- Holy Trinity Primary School, Church of England, Effra Road, Wimbledon
- St. Mary's Catholic Primary School, Russell Road, Wimbledon
- Wimbledon Chase Primary School, Merton Hall Road, Wimbledon
- Wimbledon Park Primary School, Havana Road, Wimbledon Park
- Bishop Gilpin, Lake Road, Wimbledon Park

==== Independent ====
- Allenswood Boarding Academy (Girls' School), Albert Road, Wimbledon – founded 1870, closed 1950s
- Donhead Lodge (Boys' School), Edge Hill, Wimbledon
- Ursuline Preparatory School, Wimbledon (closed 2024)
- Hall School Wimbledon (Mixed School), The Downs, Wimbledon
- King's College School, Southside, Wimbledon
- The Norwegian School in London (Norwegian School), Arteberry Road, Wimbledon
- Wimbledon High School (Girls' School), Mansel Road, Wimbledon
- Old Central School, Church of England, Camp Road, Wimbledon – founded 1758, closed 1960s
- The Rowans School (Mixed, Primary School), Drax Avenue, Wimbledon

=== Places of worship ===
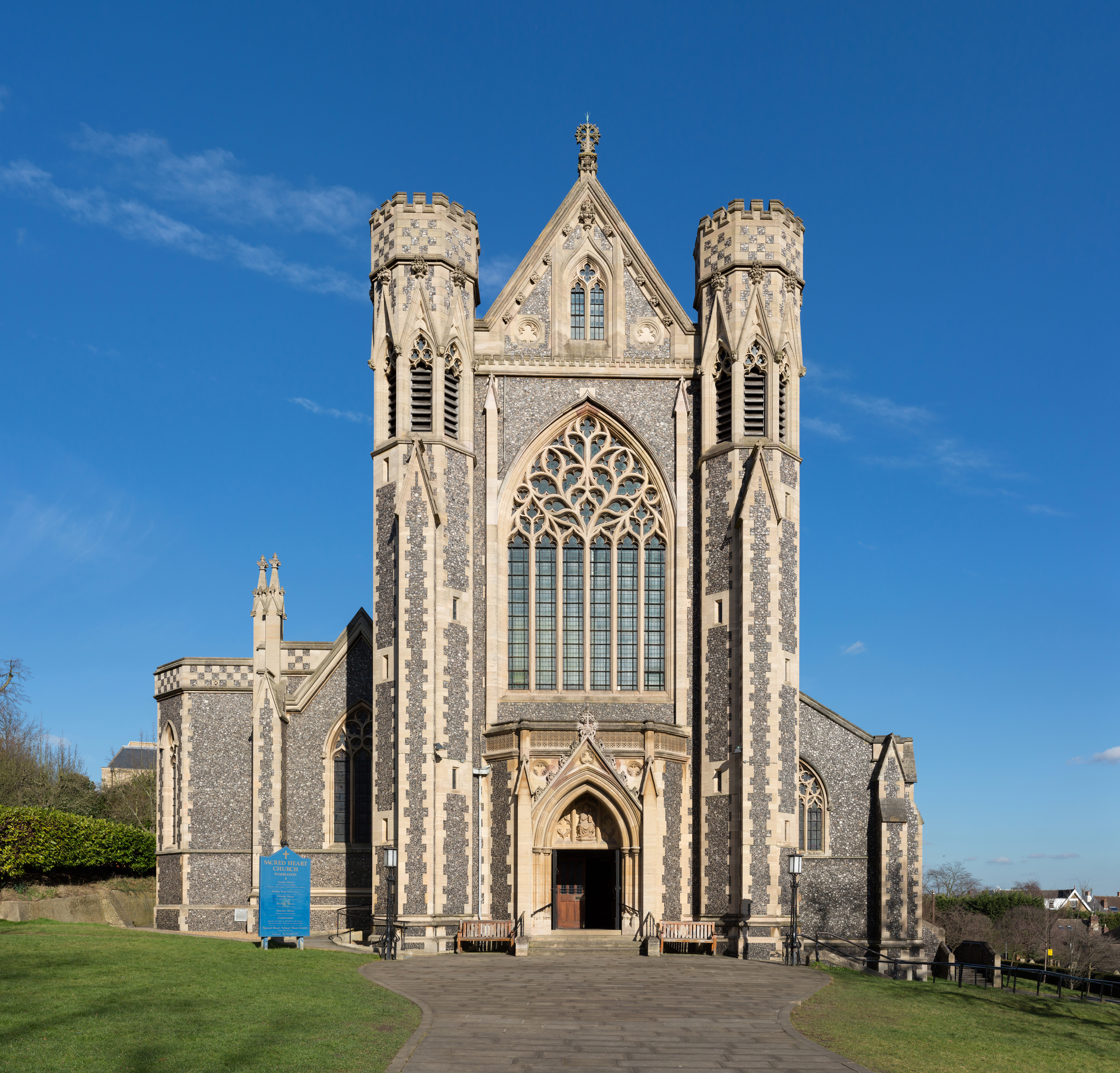
Sacred Heart RC Church, Wimbledon

- All Nations' Church (evangelical), Mansel Rd, SW19
- All Saints' Church. South Wimbledon. SW19
- Bethel Baptist Church, Broadway, SW19
- Wat Buddhapadipa (Buddhist), Calonne Rd, SW19
- Chabad Wimbledon Synagogue, St George's Road, SW19 4ED (Jewish)
- Congregational Church, Dundonald Rd, SW19
- Everyday Church, Queens Road, SW19 8LR
- Christ Church, Colliers Wood. SW19 2NY.
- Christ Church, West Wimbledon (Church of England), SW20
- Christian Science Reading Room, Worple Rd, SW19
- Church of Christ the King (Catholic), Crescent Gardens, SW19
- Elim Pentecostal Church, SW19
- Emmanuel Church (Church of England), Ridgway, SW19.
- Hillside Church (non-denominational), Worple Rd, SW19
- Holy Trinity Church (Church of England), Broadway, SW19
- Kairos Church (inter-denominational), Kingston Rd, SW19
- Kingdom Hall (Jehovah's Witnesses), Haydons Rd, SW19
- Our Lady and St Peter's Church (Catholic), Victoria Drive, SW19
- Sacred Heart Church (Catholic), Edge Hill, SW19
- St Andrews Church (Church of England), Herbert Rd, SW19
- Saint John the Divine Merton, SW19
- Shofar Christian Church, The Broadway, SW19 1RY
- St John the Baptist (Church of England), Spencer Hill, SW19
- St Luke's Church (Church of England), Ryfold Road, Wimbledon Park SW19 8BZ
- St Mary's Church (Church of England), St Mary's Rd, SW19
- St Winefride's Church, (Catholic), Latimer Rd, SW19
- Salvation Army, Kingston Rd, SW19
- Shree Ghanapathy Temple (Hindu), Effra Rd, SW19
- Wat Buddhapadipa (Buddhist), Calonne Road, SW19
- The Open Door (non-denominational), Worple Rd, SW19
- Trinity United Reformed Church, Mansel Rd, SW19
- The Wimbledon Synagogue (Reform Jewish)
- Wimbledon Mosque (Islam), Durnsford Rd, SW19
- Wimbledon Quaker Meeting, Spencer Hill Rd, SW19
- Wimbledon Spiritualist Church, SW19

== See also ==
- Crooked Billet
