= List of railway stations and tram stops in Croydon =

This is a list of stations in London Borough of Croydon. It includes all stations on the Network Rail Main Line Services that are open and Tramlink stops.

== Stations ==
=== A ===
Stations	Place	Managed By	Platforms	Zone
Addington Village Interchange	Addington	Tramlink	2	5
Addiscombe tram stop	Addiscombe	Tramlink	2	5
Ampere Way tram stop	Croydon	Tramlink	2	5
Arena tram stop	Woodside	Tramlink	2	5

=== B ===
Stations	Place	Managed By	Platforms	Zone
Beddington Lane tram stop	Beddington	Tramlink	2	4
Blackhorse Lane tram stop	Addiscombe	Tramlink	2	4

=== C ===
Stations	Place	Managed By	Platforms	Zone
Centrale tram stop	Croydon	Tramlink	1	5
Church Street tram stop	Croydon	Tramlink	1	5
Coombe Lane tram stop	Addington	Tramlink	2	6
Coulsdon South railway station	Coulsdon	Southern	2	6
Coulsdon Town railway station	Coulsdon	Southern	2	6

=== E ===
Stations	Place	Managed By	Platforms	Zone
East Croydon station	Croydon	Southern/Tramlink	6	5

=== F ===
Stations	Place	Managed By	Platforms	Zone
Fieldway tram stop	New Addington	Tramlink	2	6

=== G ===
Stations	Place	Managed By	Platforms	Zone
George Street tram stop	Croydon	Tramlink	1	5
Gravel Hill tram stop	Addington	Tramlink	2	6

=== H ===
Stations	Place	Managed By	Platforms	Zone
Harrington Road tram stop	South Norwood	Tramlink	2	5

=== K ===
Stations	Place	Managed By	Platforms	Zone
Kenley railway station	Kenley	Southern	2	6
King Henry's Drive tram stop	New Addington	Tramlink	2	6

=== L ===
Stations	Place	Managed By	Platforms	Zone
Lebanon Road tram stop	Croydon	Tramlink	2	5
Lloyd Park tram stop	Kenley	Tramlink	2	5

=== N ===
Stations	Place	Managed By	Platforms	Zone
New Addington tram stop	New Addington	Tramlink	2	6
Norbury railway station	Norbury	Southern	2	3
Norwood Junction railway station	South Norwood	London Overground	6	4

=== P ===
Stations	Place	Managed By	Platforms	Zone
Purley Oaks railway station	Purley	Southern	4	6
Purley railway station	Purley	Southern	4	6

=== R ===
Stations	Place	Managed By	Platforms	Zone
Reedham railway station	Purley	Southern	2	6
Reeves Corner tram stop	Croydon	Tramlink	1	5
Riddlesdown railway station	Purley	Southern	2	6

=== S ===
Stations	Place	Managed By	Platforms	Zone
Sanderstead railway station	Sanderstead	Southern	2	6
Sandilands tram stop	Croydon	Tramlink	2	5
Selhurst railway station	Selhurst	Southern	2	4
South Croydon railway station	South Croydon	Southern	3	5

=== T ===
Stations	Place	Managed By	Platforms	Zone
Therapia Lane tram stop	Beddington	Tramlink	2	5
Thornton Heath railway station	Thornton Heath	Southern	2	4

=== W ===
Stations	Place	Managed By	Platforms	Zone
Waddon Marsh tram stop	Waddon	Tramlink	2	5
Waddon railway station	Waddon	Southern	2	5
Wandle Park tram stop	Croydon	Tramlink	2	5
Wellesley Road tram stop	Croydon	Tramlink	1	5
West Croydon station	Croydon	London Overground/Tramlink	2	5
Woodmansterne railway station	Woodmansterne	Southern	2	6
Woodside tram stop	Woodside	Tramlink	2	4
