= 2016 Croydon tram derailment =

Fatal derailment in South London

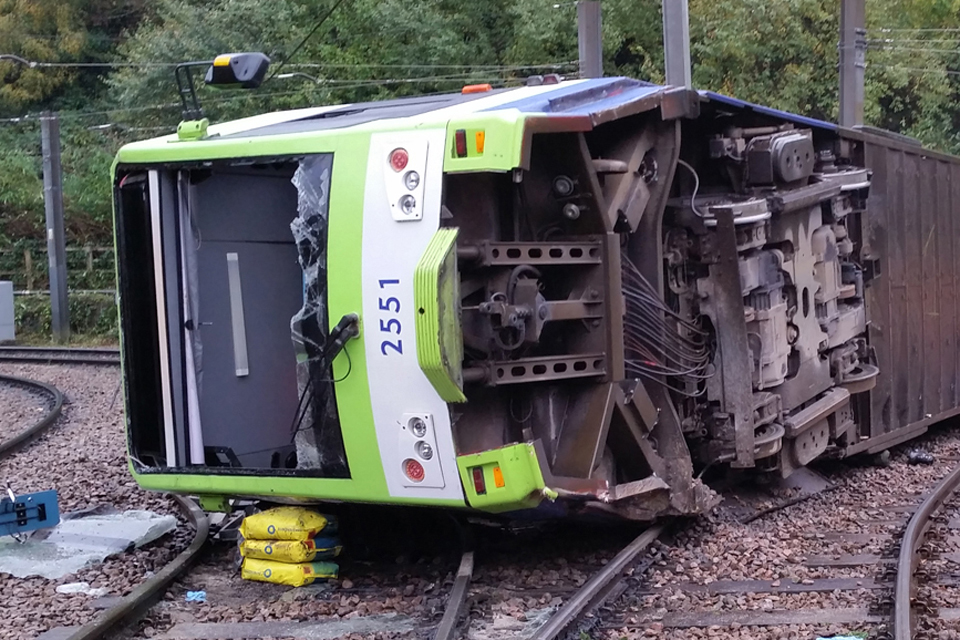
- The derailed tram at Sandilands Junction

- Location within Greater London Location within London Borough of Croydon

Details
- Date: 9 November 2016; 10 years ago 06:07 GMT
- Location: Close to Sandilands tram stop, Croydon, London
- Coordinates: 51.3743°N 0.0755°W
- Country: United Kingdom
- Line: Tramlink
- Operator: FirstGroup for Tramlink
- Incident type: Derailment
- Cause: Excessive speed on curve due to driver error (microsleep)

Statistics
- Trains: 1
- Passengers: 69
- Crew: 1
- Deaths: 7
- Injured: 62 (19 serious)
Route map

Location where the tram came to rest. The blue arrows indicate the direction of travel.

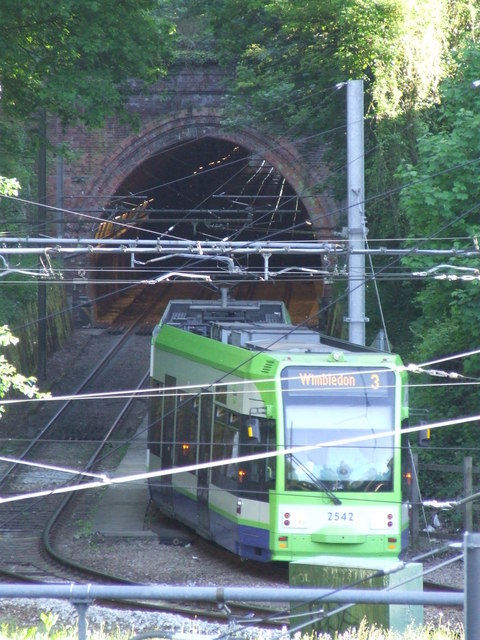
The site of the incident, in 2010. The tram is running towards the camera and entering the sharp curve on which the derailment occurred.

On 9 November 2016, a tram operated by Tramlink in London, United Kingdom, derailed and overturned on a sharp bend approaching a junction. Of 69 passengers, there were seven fatalities and 62 injured, 19 of whom sustained serious injuries. This was the first tram incident in the UK in which passengers died since 1959.

The service was running from New Addington to Wimbledon via Croydon, and was on the approach to Sandilands tram stop soon after 06:00. The speed limit dropped from 80 km/h (50 mph) to 20 km/h (12 mph) at the junction, but the driver did not slow down significantly.

A Rail Accident Investigation Branch investigation found that the driver of the tram had lost awareness before the crash, possibly as a result of microsleep. It also criticised the lack of signage in advance of the sudden change in speed limit.

An inquest returned verdicts of accidental death on all seven victims. In March 2022, the Office of Rail and Road announced that it was to prosecute the driver of the tram, Tram Operations Limited and Transport for London over the accident. In June 2023, the driver was cleared after a trial at the Old Bailey.

== Accident ==
The accident took place in the dark and during heavy rain at 06:07, on a sharp left curve approaching the points where the route from New Addington (on which the tram was operating) converges with the line from Beckenham Junction and Elmers End. The curve is located in a cutting, which comes almost immediately after the line emerges from a series of three tunnels on a 1-mile (1.6 km) straight section of track after leaving Lloyd Park tram stop. It has been described as a "sharp bend", and has a 20 km/h (12 mph) speed restriction.

The tram entered the curve at a speed of approximately 73 km/h (45 mph) and derailed, overturning on its right side and coming to a stop 25 m (27 yards) beyond the point of derailment, damaging the side of the tram and ejecting several passengers through broken windows. The tram involved was No. 2551, a Bombardier CR4000 constructed in 1998 by Bombardier Transportation, a two-section articulated unit with a maximum design speed of 80 km/h (50 mph).

The emergency services confirmed that 51 people were injured, and initially stated that five had died. The death toll later rose to seven. The victims, six men and a woman, were between 19 and 63 years old. Sixteen of the survivors were described as having serious or life-threatening injuries. The final casualty figures were seven dead and 62 injured, 19 seriously. One person was uninjured.

It was the deadliest tram accident in the United Kingdom since an accident at Dover in 1917 killed eleven and injured 60, and the first in the United Kingdom in which passengers died since three people died in an accident in Glasgow in 1959. It is also the deadliest accident on any rail network in the UK since the 2001 Great Heck rail crash.

== Aftermath ==
The injured were taken to St George's Hospital in Tooting, and to Croydon University Hospital. As well as the 51 people taken to hospital, seven more made their own way to hospital for treatment. Twenty-two ambulances, eight fire engines, and over 70 firefighters from the London Fire Brigade were sent to the scene. Assistance was given by Croydon Council, the Red Cross, Salvation Army and railway chaplains. FirstGroup, which operates the tram service on behalf of Transport for London (TfL), said it was "shocked and saddened by what happened." An extra minute was added to the two-minute Armistice Day silence at Croydon Cenotaph. TfL later made an offer to cover the funeral expenses of the victims.

During the night of 10–11 November, the tram was righted in preparation for removal from the accident site, and it was removed on the morning of 12 November. The tram had suffered serious damage to its right side, onto which it had overturned.

After the accident, no services operated on the line between East Croydon and Addington Village, Harrington Road or Elmers End. Partial tram services ran between East Croydon and Wimbledon, between New Addington and Addington Village, and between Beckenham Junction and Harrington Road. Full services were reinstated on 18 November.

It was found that the speed restriction sign for the bend at Sandilands was not visible to drivers until the tram had travelled 90 to 120 m (98 to 131 yards) past the point where braking would need to have been initiated to reach the required speed at the sign — drivers "were expected to know this from their knowledge of the route". At Sandilands, an additional speed restriction was imposed before the curve, and chevron signs were installed to give better warning of the curve. Chevron signs were also installed at three other locations on the Croydon Tramlink system. Following recommendations made in the first interim report into the accident, tram systems in the United Kingdom introduced stepped speed reductions where there was a required reduction in speed of 30 km/h (19 mph) or more. This affected systems in Blackpool, Edinburgh, the West Midlands and Nottingham.

In March 2017, it was reported that Tramtrack Croydon and TfL had admitted liability for the accident. Victims and survivors would not have to sue for compensation for losses caused by the accident. In August 2017, TfL confirmed they would be altering Tramlink timetables to take account of reduced speed limits.

In November 2017, two days of strikes by tram drivers were announced following the installation of fatigue monitoring devices. The devices shine an infrared light into the driver's face and are capable of generating an alert and vibrating the driver's chair if eye movements indicate a lack of attention. Some drivers have raised concerns about health and safety issues, and have described the device as a "spy in the cab".

On 22 January 2018, the Office of Rail and Road (ORR) organised a safety summit in Manchester to discuss the findings of the Rail Accident Investigation Branch (RAIB) report on the investigation into the accident. In January 2019, it was announced that all trams on the system were to be fitted with a system which would automatically apply the brakes if the tram exceeded the speed limit. As of July 2019, tram 2551 was still in the custody of the RAIB in Farnborough and had not returned to service. The tram was returned to TfL custody in March 2022. It remains out of service as of June 2025.

The decision that no prosecutions were to take place meant that an inquest could be held. A pre-inquest review was held at Croydon Town Hall on 25 September 2019. The driver of the tram did not attend, saying he was unwell. His decision was criticised by the barrister representing five of the victims. The full inquest was due to begin on 19 October 2020, but was delayed until 17 May 2021 due to the COVID-19 pandemic. The inquest was held at the Fairfield Halls, Croydon. A jury was sworn in on 17 May, and on 22 July returned a verdict of accidental death. Relatives of the victims of the accident announced that they intend to call on Attorney General Michael Ellis to apply to the High Court for a fresh inquest. The mother of one of the victims called for a public inquiry into the accident.

== Investigations ==
=== British Transport Police ===
The 42-year-old tram driver was arrested by the British Transport Police on suspicion of manslaughter on the day of the accident. After questioning, he was released on bail until May 2017. According to Metro, one aspect of the police investigation was whether or not the tram driver fell asleep; and The Guardian reported that some passengers said the driver had blacked out at the controls. In November 2017, it was reported that a file was being prepared for the Crown Prosecution Service (CPS), who would decide whether or not a trial would take place. In May 2019 it was reported that the CPS were still awaiting the file from the British Transport Police, who were still gathering evidence. On 31 October 2019, British Transport Police and the CPS announced that neither the driver, operating company or TfL would face prosecution. The CPS stated that while there was evidence of negligence by the driver, it did not count as "gross" and so "manslaughter by gross negligence" could not apply. Prosecutors also stated that because the section of tramway where the crash happened was neither legally a railway nor a public place then various other potential offences would not apply. However, a prosecution was subsequently started by the ORR.

A former driver suggested to The Times that a blackout was a possibility, due to the erratic shift patterns that the drivers had to adhere to. He also said that the vending machine at the tram depot was stocked only with energy drinks, and that "Nobody is ever fully awake; I was always in a bit of a daze and that is because the way the shifts work doesn't allow the drivers to get a regular sleep pattern." Following this, multiple sources reported on a video apparently showing a different driver struggling to stay awake at the controls. The driver concerned was suspended pending an investigation into the matter.

=== Office of Rail and Road ===
The ORR opened its own investigation into the accident, concentrating on whether or not safety rules were followed. They confirmed that British trams are not fitted with an overspeed protection system. The ORR was expected to make an announcement about its investigation early in 2018. On the third anniversary of the accident, the ORR tweeted that its investigation was ongoing.

=== Rail Accident Investigation Branch ===
The RAIB also investigated the accident, with data from the tram's on-board event recorder being analysed. The RAIB stated that initial indications suggested that the tram was travelling at a significantly higher speed than permitted. Rail magazine reported that the tram's electro-magnetic track brakes had not been activated. Following the accident, The Guardian reported that on 31 October passengers had made allegations on Facebook of a tram travelling round the curve at excessive speed. The Evening Standard reported an earlier passenger complaint describing the tram as "tipping" on the curve. The driver of the tram involved in the incident of 31 October was not the one involved in the accident on 9 November.

The interim report was released a week later on 16 November 2016. At the time of the accident, it was dark and it was raining heavily. There was no evidence of any track defects, or obstructions on the track, that could have contributed to the derailment. Initial investigation did not indicate any malfunction of the tram's braking system. Initial findings were that the tram was travelling at approximately 70 km/h (43 mph) at the time of the accident—far exceeding the speed restriction. The RAIB interim report noted that "a tram approaching the Sandilands Junction area from Lloyd Park at 80 km/h (50 mph) would need to brake at its full service rate of 1.3 m/s² for approximately 180 metres (4.3 ft/s^{2} for 590 ft) before the speed restriction board in order to be travelling at 20 km/h (12 mph) when the board was reached." The On Tram Data Recorder (OTDR) indicated that some braking had occurred within this distance but only sufficient to reduce the tram's speed from 80 to 70 km/h.

A recommendation was made that a further speed limit should be introduced prior to the one for the curve at Sandilands Junction before the line reopened to traffic. The recommendation was accepted and three further speed restrictions were put in place before the line reopened. The report also found that a number of passengers with fatal or serious injuries had been ejected from the tram through broken bodyside and door windows. In November 2016, Rail magazine called for the RAIB to complete its investigation and release the final report "much more rapidly than has become the norm".

A second interim report was released on 20 February 2017. In April 2017, it was reported that there had been three cases of speeding on the section of line which included the accident site in the period November 2016 – April 2017. In one case, a tram was reported to be travelling at 64 km/h (40 mph) in a 40 km/h (25 mph) zone. Within the second interim report the RAIB noted that drivers of trams approaching the curve could be expected to sight the curve and the speed restriction sign from 90 metres (300 ft) with full beam headlights and 60 metres (200 ft) with dipped beam headlights. Although the report states that the tram's braking system was not capable of slowing the tram sufficiently between the point where the speed restriction sign became visible and the point at which the speed restriction is enforced, it also says, "There was no sign to indicate to drivers where they should begin to apply the brake for the Sandilands curve; they were expected to know this from their knowledge of the route."

In the light of the first interim report the ORR requested that all operators of light rail tramway systems apply a system of stepped speed restrictions where reductions in speed greater than 30 km/h (19 mph) are required by changes in the characteristics of the track.

The final report was published on 7 December 2017. Driver error was found to be the cause of the accident, with the most likely scenario being that the driver had a microsleep episode approaching the bend. Fifteen recommendations were made. Key findings of the RAIB investigation were that the tram's windows, which were made of toughened glass, were not strong enough to contain passengers inside the tram. All the fatalities had been ejected through the right side windows. Laminated glass would not have broken, improving the survivability of the accident. Regulations applying to trams were similar to those applying to buses. If railway regulations had applied, laminated glass would have been fitted. The tram's operators had not considered it possible for a tramcar to overturn. There had been insufficient reporting of previous incidents by drivers, who feared that they would be disciplined rather than such reports being seen as an opportunity to learn a safety lesson (a blame culture rather than a just culture). The system for dealing with complaints from passengers was not fit for purpose. The investigation also found that trams were not as safe as the ORR previously thought, having a higher accident rate than other rail transport and also buses and coaches.

An update to the final report was issued on 24 October 2018. The update included the addition of a Transport for London (TfL) audit of Tram Operations Limited's fatigue risk management system, a copy of a letter sent to all UK tram operators and some minor technical corrections. In response to Recommendation 1 of the final report, the Light Rail Safety and Standards Board (LRSSB) was established. The ORR has observer status on the LRSSB.

=== Transport for London ===
TfL commissioned SNC-Lavalin to carry out an investigation into the accident. The investigation report was published in January 2018. TfL stated that all recommendations from the RAIB final report would be implemented.

=== Victoria Derbyshire programme ===
In April 2017, the BBC Two programme Victoria Derbyshire reported that its own investigation into drivers falling asleep at the controls of trams on the Tramlink network revealed four such cases. Six drivers claimed that the dead-man's vigilance device fitted to the trams was not fit for purpose. Tramlink stated that the devices were "fully functional".

== New safety measures ==
During 2019, an automatic system to apply the tram brakes if the speed limit is exceeded at "high risk locations" on the Tramlink network was installed. On tramcars, the thickness of the window safety film was increased from 100 to 175 μm, to prevent passengers being ejected during an accident, and emergency lighting, independent of the tram battery, was installed. In April 2019, the RAIB reported that the addition of the thicker film to Tramlink trams had been implemented. Tests had shown that containment provided by the film had been improved.

== Prosecution ==
On 24 March 2022, the Office of Rail and Road announced that it was to prosecute the driver of the tram, Tram Operations Limited (TOL) and Transport for London (TfL) over the accident.

The trial started on 10 June 2022 at Croydon Magistrates Court. TOL and TfL pleaded guilty to offences of "failure to ensure the health and safety of passengers on the Croydon Tramlink network, so far as reasonably practicable" under Section 3(1) of the Health and Safety at Work etc. Act 1974. TOL were fined £4 million and TfL were fined £10 million. Each company was also ordered to pay £234,404 in costs and a £170 victim surcharge.

The tram driver pleaded not guilty to a charge of "failure to take reasonable care of passengers", under section 7(a) of that act. The case was sent to the Crown Court for a pre-trial hearing and case management. In May 2023, his trial opened at the Old Bailey. On 19 June, the jury returned a verdict of not guilty in respect of the charges faced by the tram driver.

== Memorials ==
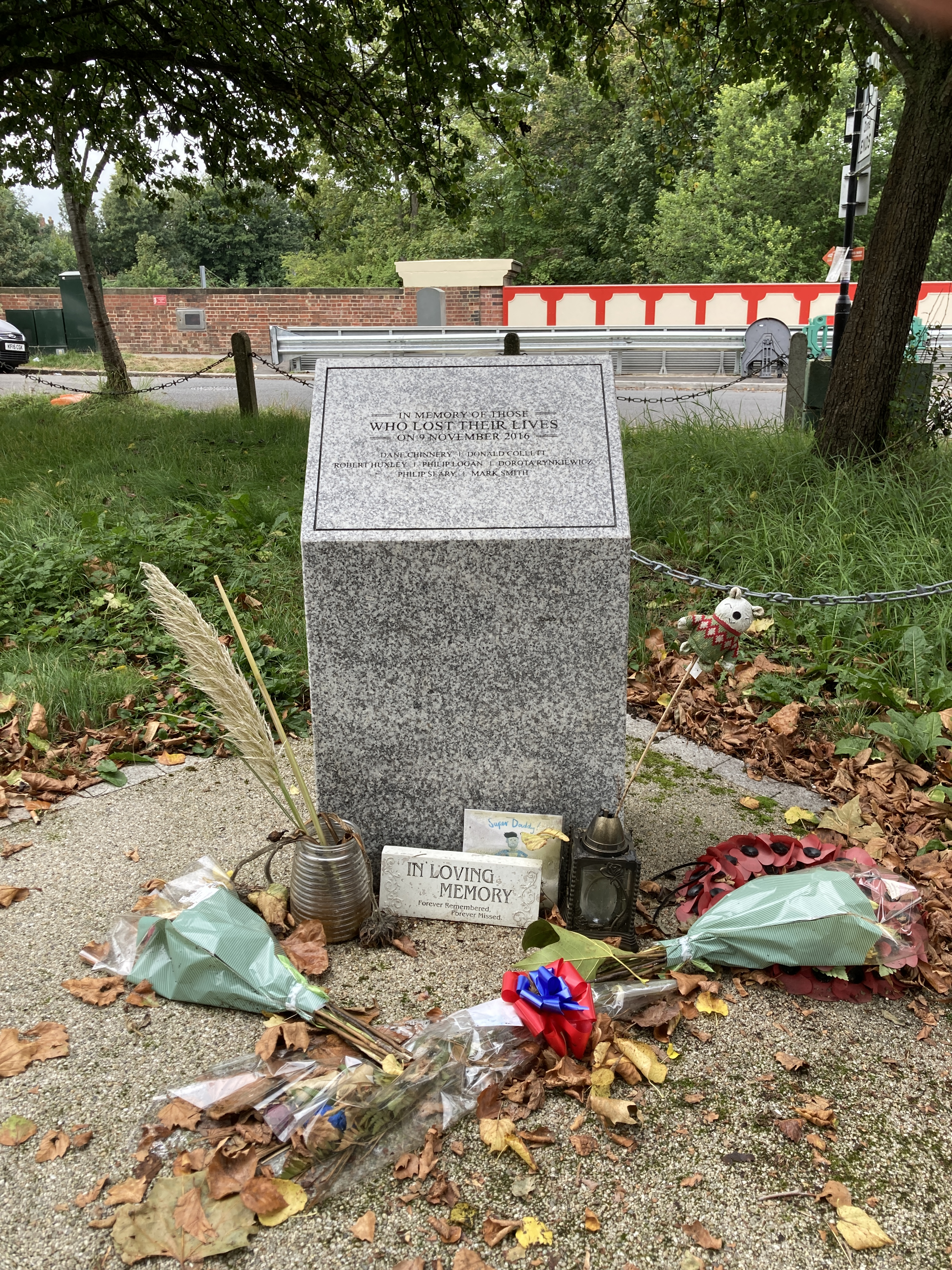
Crash memorial close to the accident site

There are two memorials to the crash – one by the site of the crash itself on Sandilands Road, and another in New Addington.

== See also ==
- List of tram accidents
- List of rail accidents (2010–2019)
- List of rail accidents in the United Kingdom
- Transport in the United Kingdom § Trams and light rail
