= Sandland (disambiguation) =

Sand Land is a Japanese Manga series.

Sandland(s) or Sand Land may also refer to:

- Sandland, a village in Finnmark, Norway
- Sandland (Antalya), a sand art festival in Turkey
- Sandland (surname)
- Sand Land (video game), an action role-playing video game developed by ILCA

== See also ==
- Sandylands, a British television show
- Sandilands, disambiguation page
