= Fieldway tram stop =

Tramstop in New Addington, London Borough of Croydon, UK

Fieldway
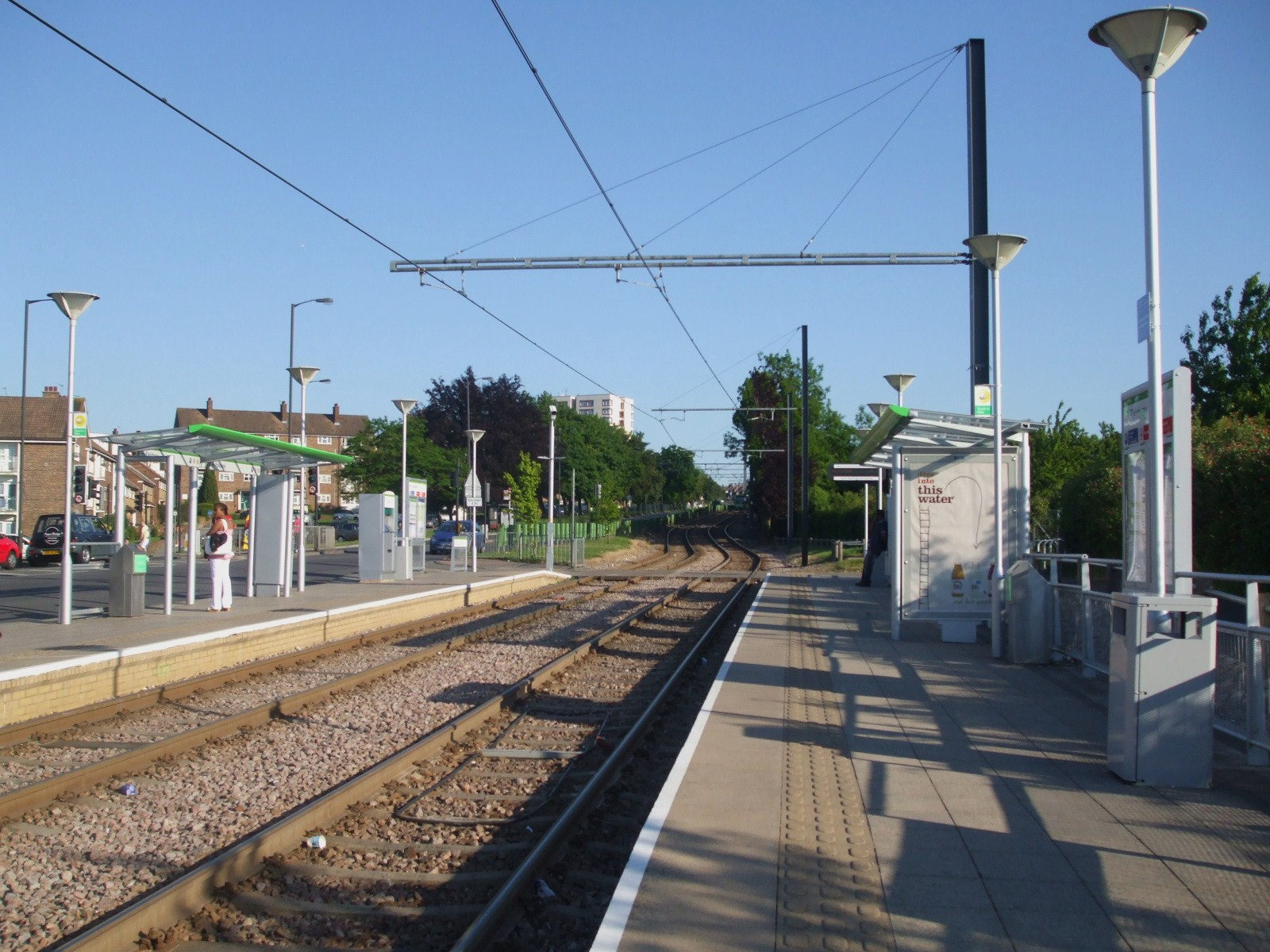
- Looking south

General information
- Location: Lodge Lane, New Addington, Croydon
- Coordinates: 51.350931°N 0.024205°W
- Operated by: Tramlink
- Platforms: 2

Construction
- Structure type: At-grade
- Accessible: Yes

Other information
- Status: Unstaffed
- Website: Official website

History
- Opened: 10 May 2000
Location
- Location in Croydon

Fieldway tram stop is a light rail stop serving the Fieldway residential area of New Addington, located in the London Borough of Croydon. It is adjacent to a northbound bus stop on the A2022 Lodge Lane.

== Services ==
Fieldway is served by tram services operated by Tramlink. The tram stop is served by trams every 7-8 minutes between New Addington and West Croydon via East Croydon and Centrale.

A very small number of early morning and late evening services continue beyond Croydon to and from Therapia Lane and Wimbledon. During the evenings on weekends, the service is reduced to a tram every 15 minutes.

Services are operated using Bombardier CR4000 and Stadler Variobahn Trams.

Preceding station	Tramlink	Following station
Addington Village towards West Croydon	Tramlink; New Addington to Croydon town centre	King Henry's Drive towards New Addington

== Connections ==
London Buses route 314 serves the stop providing connections to New Addington, Hayes, Bromley and Eltham.

Free interchange for journeys made within an hour between buses and trams is available at Fieldway as part of Transport for London's Hopper Fare.
