= George Street tram stop =

Tramlink tram stop in London, England

George Street
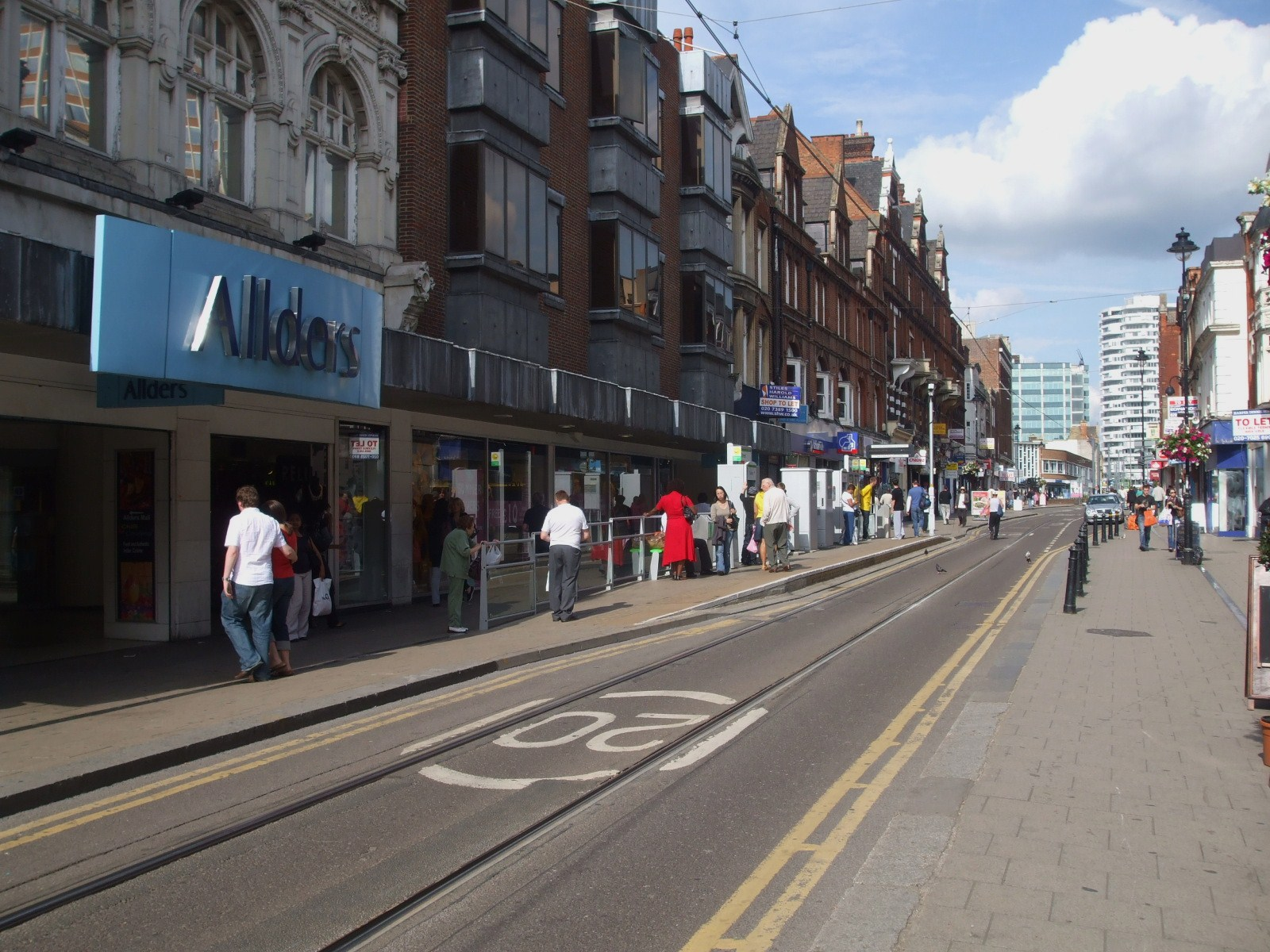
- Viewed from western side

General information
- Location: George Street, Croydon
- Coordinates: 51.3739°N 0.0990°W
- Operated by: Tramlink
- Platforms: 1

Construction
- Structure type: At-grade
- Accessible: Yes

Other information
- Status: Unstaffed
- Website

History
- Opened: 10 May 2000
Location
- Location in Croydon

George Street is a tram stop in Croydon, south London, served by Tramlink. It is located in the main shopping area of central Croydon. It is one of the busiest stops on the service, but with notably limited facilities because of its constrained site on a narrow street. It is on a single track section, with trams only departing in the westbound direction. Located on a section of road reserved for pedestrians and cyclists, it is the worst location on the network for trams being held-up by poorly parked cars in loading bays. George Street was the western terminus of a horse-tram to Addiscombe that began operation in December 1883, converted to electric traction in 1901 and was withdrawn in 1927. The stop opened on 10 May 2000 with the first section of Tramlink.

== History ==
George Street was the western terminus of the former route of the Croydon Corporation Tramways service to Addiscombe. Horse-drawn tram service was introduced in December 1883 by the Croydon and Norwood Tramways Company. Electric service commenced on 18 December 1901. By 1926, the route from George Street required replacement track. The decision was taken by Croydon Borough Council to instead replace the trams with buses. Tram service was withdrawn on 28 March 1927. Tracks were removed in August 1927, with new track laid for Tramlink in December 1998. The stop opened with Route 3 between Croydon and New Addington on 10 May 2000, the first day of Tramlink service. Ownership was transferred to Transport for London on 27 June 2008. A tram broke down at the stop in July 2013. The stop was closed for maintenance work in February 2025.

== Design ==
George Street is an on-street stop in the constrained site of a narrow street. The design had to take into account the conservation area status. It is a single platform raised 315 mm (12.4 in) above rail level to permit level boarding, with a passenger information display, a help point, lighting and CCTV camera. For accessibility, there are ramps at either end of the platform and tactile and contrasting paving strips. It is one of only two stops that was not provided with shelters or seating. (Note: The other stop without shelters or seating is Reeves Corner.) Trams are carried on slab track integrated into the roadway.

== Location ==
The tram stop is located on George Street in the central shopping area of Croydon town centre. It is on a section of road that is designated for cyclists and pedestrians only. Despite this, it is the worst location on the Tramlink network for trams being held-up by cars and vans causing disruption and delaying services. This is because of loading bays used by poorly parked vehicles. There were 19 reported incidents of trams blocked at George Street between 2019 and 2026.

London Buses routes 60, 119, 166, 405, 407, 412, 466 and 468, and night route N68 serve nearby bus stops. Free interchange for journeys made within an hour is available between trams and buses as part of Transport for London's Hopper fare.

== Services ==
The typical off-peak service in trams per hour from George Street is:

- 6 tph westbound only between Beckenham Junction and Wimbledon
- 6 tph westbound only between Elmers End and Wimbledon
- 8 tph westbound only between New Addington and West Croydon

Services are operated using Bombardier CR4000 and Stadler Variobahn model low-floor trams.

The stop is one of the busiest on the network, ranking 8th in 2025 by number of tap-ins.

Preceding station	Tramlink	Following station
Church Street towards Wimbledon	Tramlink; Wimbledon to Beckenham Junction	East Croydon One-way operation
Church Street towards Wimbledon	Tramlink; Wimbledon to Elmers End	East Croydon One-way operation
Church Street towards West Croydon	Tramlink; New Addington to Croydon town centre	East Croydon One-way operation
