= King Henry's Drive tram stop =

Tramlink tram stop in London, England

King Henry's Drive
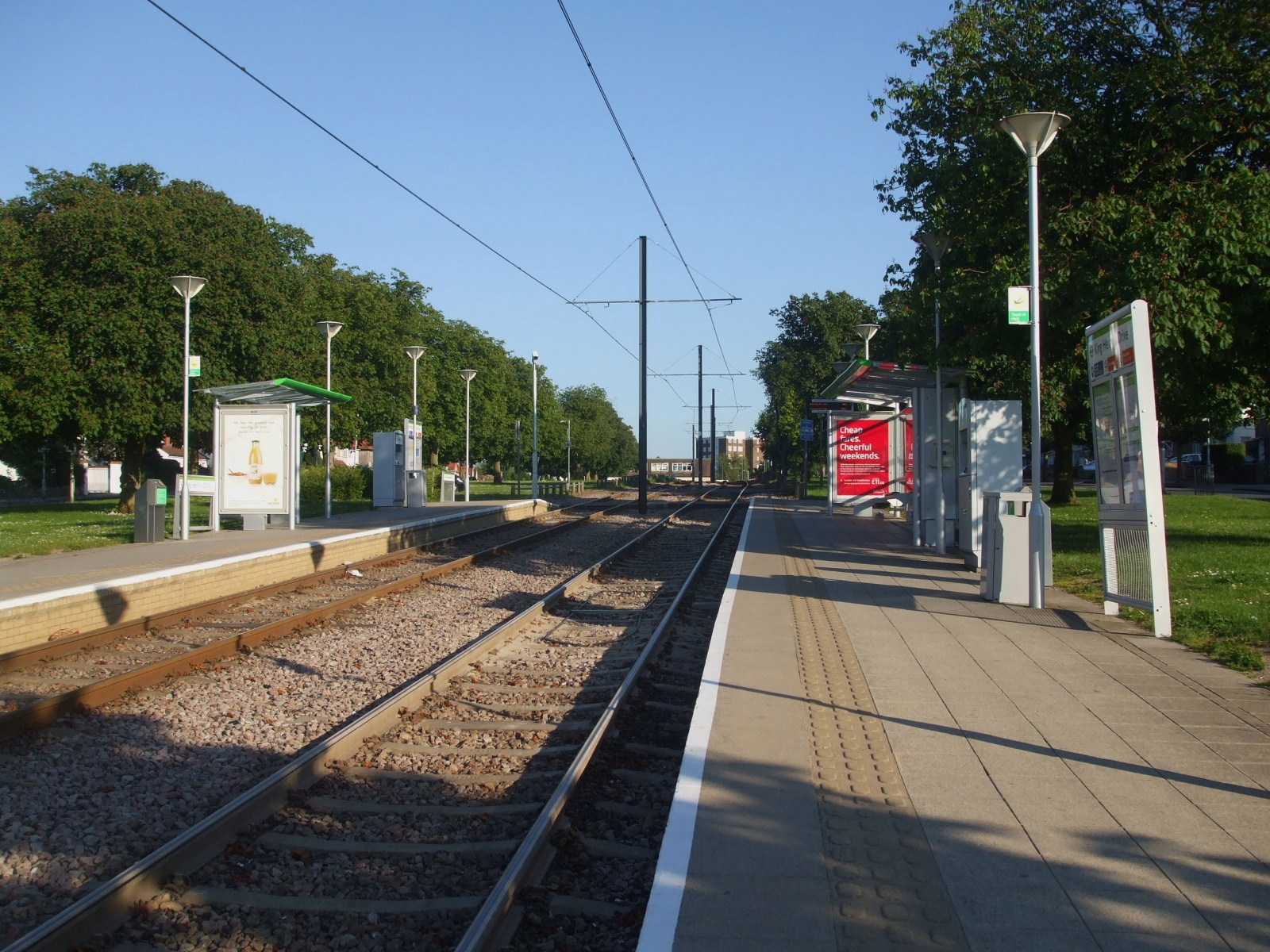
- Stop is located in a wide central reservation

General information
- Location: Parkway, New Addington, Croydon
- Coordinates: 51.345453°N 0.020352°W
- Operated by: Tramlink
- Platforms: 2

Construction
- Structure type: At-grade
- Accessible: Yes

Other information
- Status: Unstaffed
- Website: Official website

History
- Opened: 10 May 2000
Location
- Location in Croydon

King Henry's Drive tram stop is a light rail stop serving the Betchworth Way residential area of New Addington, located in the London Borough of Croydon. It is located in the wide central reservation of a dual carriageway.

== Services ==
King Henry's Drive is served by tram services operated by Tramlink. The tram stop is served by trams every 7-8 minutes between New Addington and West Croydon via East Croydon and Centrale.

A very small number of early morning and late evening services continue beyond Croydon to and from Therapia Lane and Wimbledon. During the evenings on weekends, the service is reduced to a tram every 15 minutes.

Services are operated using Bombardier CR4000 and Stadler Variobahn Trams.

Preceding station	Tramlink	Following station
Fieldway towards West Croydon	Tramlink; New Addington to Croydon town centre	New Addington Terminus

== Connections ==
The stop is served by London Buses routes 64 and 130 which provide connections to New Addington, Addington Village, Croydon town centre and Thornton Heath.

Free interchange for journeys made within an hour between bus services, and between buses and trams, is available at King Henry's Drive as part of Transport for London's Hopper Fare.
