= Sandilands Tunnel =

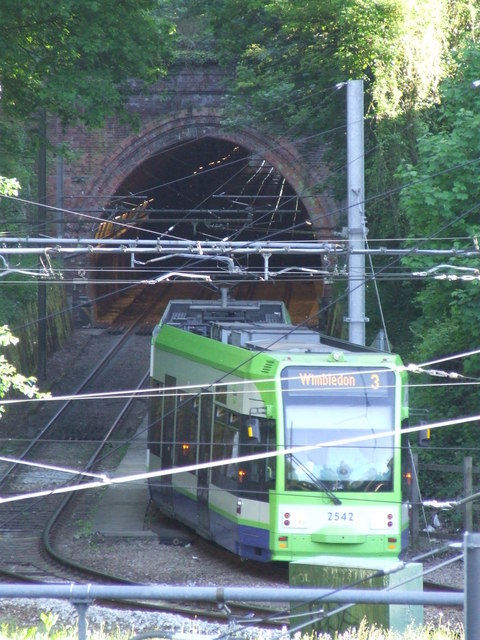
- A tram exiting Sandilands Tunnel

- Location within Greater London

Overview
- Line: Tramlink, New Addington, route
- Location: Croydon, UK
- Coordinates: 51.373°N 0.075°W
- Status: Open, operational

Operation
- Work began: 1885
- Owner: TFL
- Operator: Tramlink

Technical
- Length: 545 yd (498 m)
- Track gauge: 1,435 mm (4 ft 8 1/2 in) standard gauge

Sandilands Tunnel is an ex-railway, brick arch tunnel in south London, currently serving the Croydon Tramway, which cuts through the Park Hill area on the eastern border of Croydon and serves as a key section of the Tramlink route connecting central Croydon, from West Croydon to New Addington.

== Location ==
Sandilands Tunnel is located a short distance from Sandilands tram stop in the London Borough of Croydon and is the collective name for three contiguous former railway tunnels, routed under the Park Hill area of Croydon. The three tunnels consist of the Radcliffe Road (Woodside) tunnel which is 243 m (266 yd), Park Hill tunnel which is 112 m (122 yd) and Coombe Road tunnel which is 144 m (157 yd). These three tunnels are the only tunnels on the Croydon Tramlink network and can be found at Park Hill Tunnel (Croydon) OS Grid Ref TQ337651 (South portal) & TQ340656 (North portal).

== History ==
Sandilands Tunnel is of brick arch construction and was the main engineering feature. The Woodside and South Croydon Joint Railway which opened on 19 August 1885, operating from the South Eastern Railway's Mid-Kent line at Woodside, to a junction with the Croydon & Oxted Joint (LB&SCR & SER) line which had opened on 10 March 1884. Park Hill Tunnel, which is the middle tunnel of the three, linking Woodside tunnel and Coombe Road tunnel, was constructed in the early part of the 20th century as a cut and cover tunnel to manage slipping issues with the previous cutting.

=== 2016 derailment incident ===
In November 2016, the Croydon tram derailment occurred close to the northern end of the tunnel when a westbound tram did not slow sufficiently to negotiate the left-hand bend and overturned causing several fatalities.
