= Lebanon Road tram stop =

Tramlink tram stop in London, England

Lebanon Road
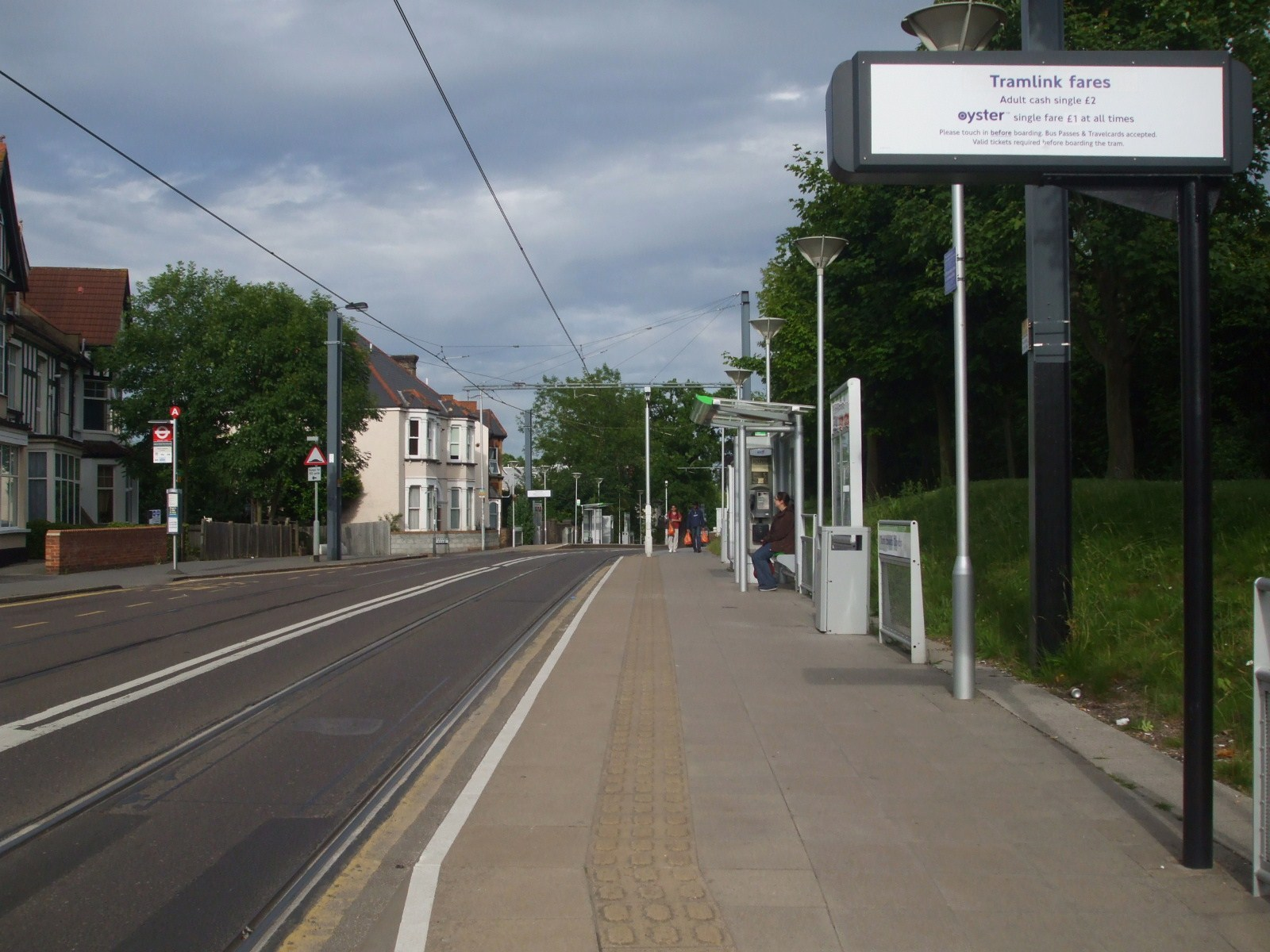
- Westbound platform looking east

General information
- Location: Addiscombe Road, Croydon
- Coordinates: 51.37651°N 0.08614°W
- Operated by: Tramlink
- Platforms: 2

Construction
- Structure type: At-grade
- Accessible: Yes

Other information
- Status: Unstaffed
- Website: Official website

History
- Opened: 10 May 2000
Location
- Location in Croydon

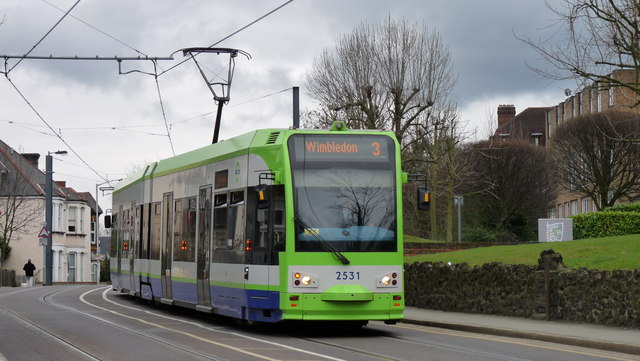
A route 3 tram leaving Lebanon Road, going west towards East Croydon

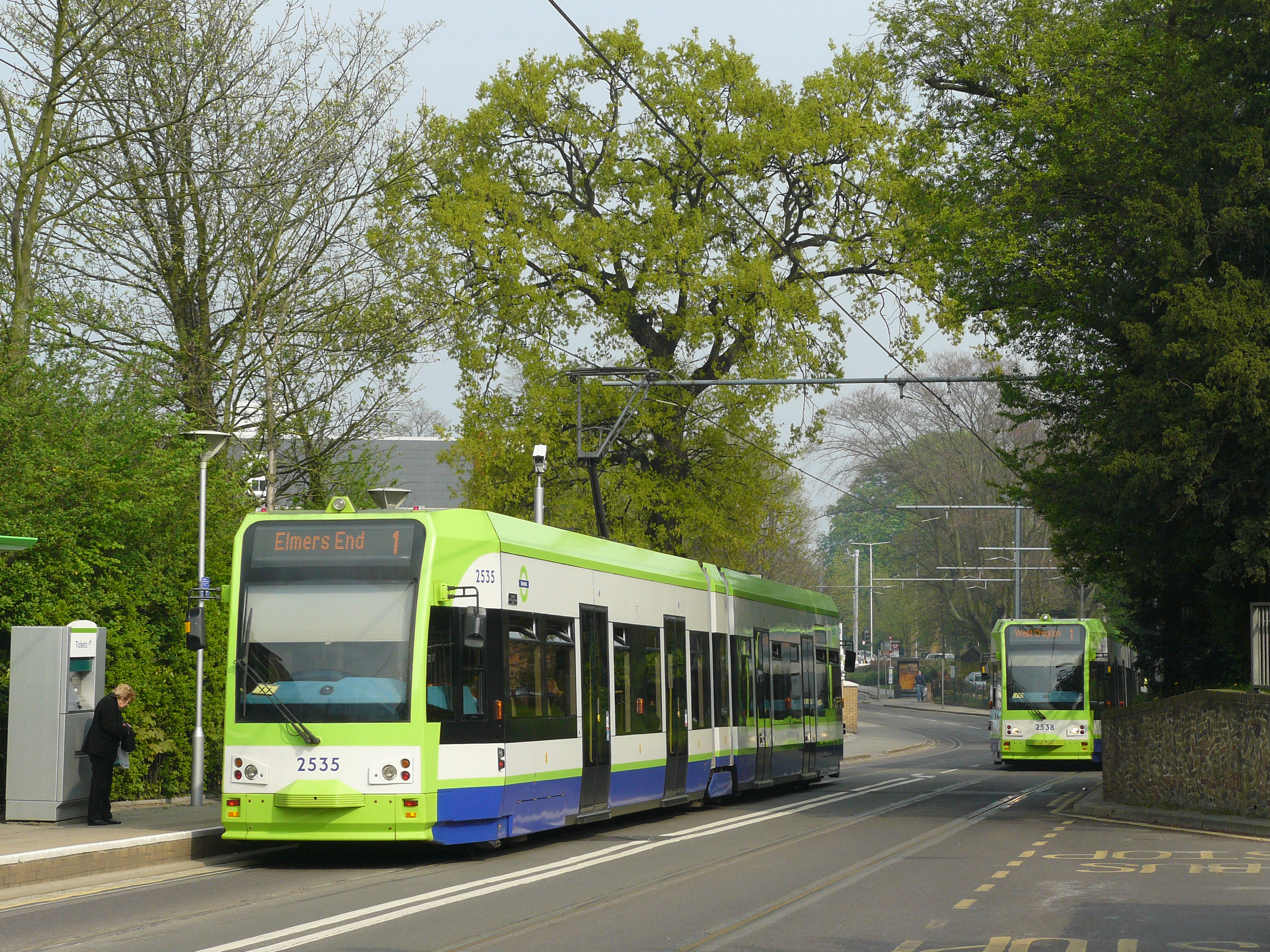
Trams passing in front of Lebanon Road stop

Lebanon Road tram stop is a light rail stop in the London Borough of Croydon in the southern suburbs of London. It serves the residential area along Addiscombe Road to the east of the centre of the town of Croydon. The stop is named after Lebanon Road, a cross-street in the vicinity of the stop.

The tram stop is within the section of route where the tram line runs within Addiscombe Road, sharing road space with buses and local traffic. The two platforms are located on each side of the two lane road, but are staggered laterally rather than being opposite each other.

== Services ==
The typical off-peak service in trams per hour from Lebanon Road is:

- 6 tph in each direction between Beckenham Junction and Wimbledon
- 6 tph in each direction between Elmers End and Wimbledon
- 8 tph in each direction between New Addington and West Croydon

Services are operated using Bombardier CR4000 and Stadler Variobahn model low-floor trams.

Preceding station	Tramlink	Following station
East Croydon towards Wimbledon	Tramlink; Wimbledon to Beckenham Junction	Sandilands towards Beckenham Junction
East Croydon towards Wimbledon	Tramlink; Wimbledon to Elmers End	Sandilands towards Elmers End
East Croydon towards West Croydon	Tramlink; New Addington to Croydon town centre	Sandilands towards New Addington

== Connections ==
London Buses routes 119, 194, 198 and 466 serve the tram stop.

Free interchange for journeys made within an hour is available between trams and buses as part of Transport for London's Hopper Fare.
