= Wellesley Road tram stop =

Tramlink tram stop in London, England

Wellesley Road
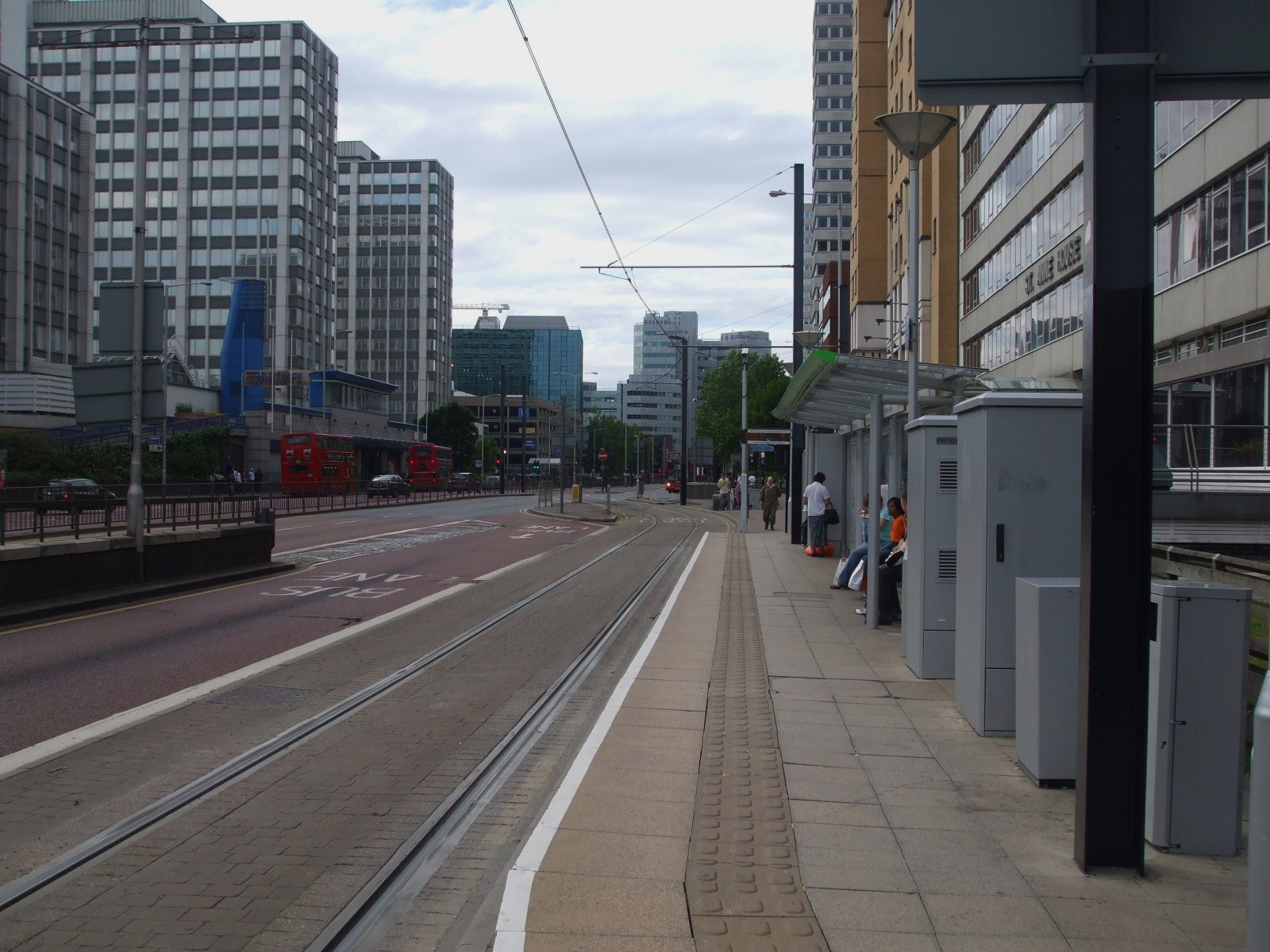
- Wellesley Road: platform looking north

General information
- Location: Wellesley Road, Croydon
- Coordinates: 51.3756°N 0.0976°W
- Operated by: Tramlink
- Platforms: 1

Construction
- Structure type: At-grade
- Accessible: Yes

Other information
- Status: Unstaffed
- Website: Official website

History
- Opened: 10 May 2000
Location
- Location in Croydon

Wellesley Road tram stop is a stop on the Tramlink service in the London Borough of Croydon. It consists of a single platform on Wellesley Road at the diverge just before the Croydon Underpass and is served southbound only. All Tramlink routes call at the stop.

== Services ==
The typical off-peak service in trams per hour from Wellesley Road is:

- 6 tph eastbound only between Wimbledon and Beckenham Junction
- 6 tph eastbound only between Wimbledon and Elmers End
- 8 tph eastbound only between West Croydon and New Addington

Services are operated using Bombardier CR4000 and Stadler Variobahn model low-floor trams.

Preceding station	Tramlink	Following station
West Croydon One-way operation	Tramlink; Wimbledon to Beckenham Junction	East Croydon towards Beckenham Junction
West Croydon One-way operation	Tramlink; Wimbledon to Elmers End	East Croydon towards Elmers End
West Croydon One-way operation	Tramlink; New Addington to Croydon town centre	East Croydon towards New Addington
