= Rat River (Red River of the North tributary) =

Tributary of the Red River

Rat River Rivière aux Rats
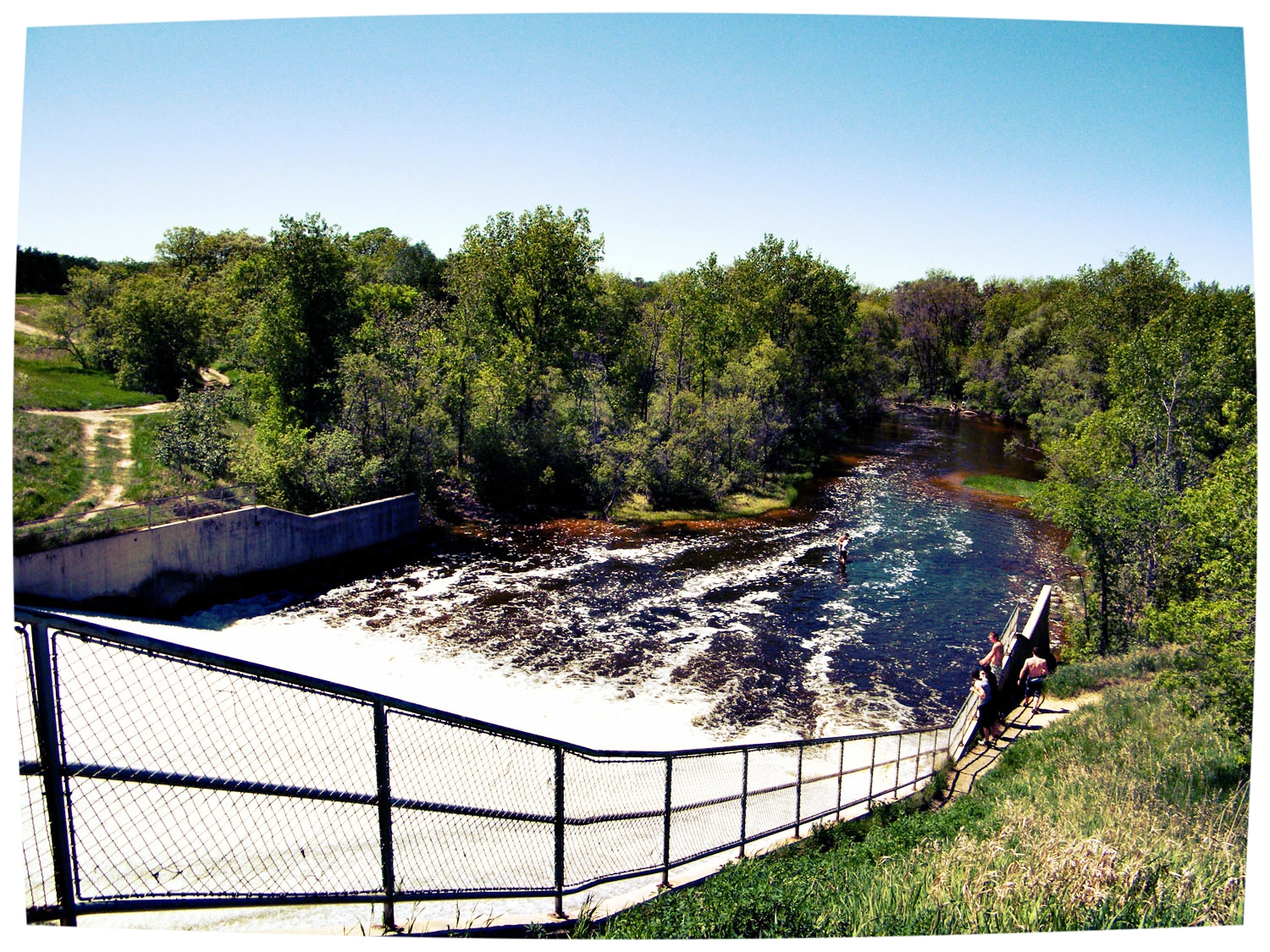
- Rat River Dam at St. Malo Provincial Park

Location
- Country: Canada
- Province: Manitoba

Physical characteristics
- Source: Sandilands area
- Mouth: Red River of the North
  - location: Saint Boniface, Winnipeg, Manitoba
  - coordinates: 49°35′16″N 97°08′16″W
  - elevation: 226 m (741 ft)

Basin features
- River system: Red River

The Rat River (French: Rivière aux Rats) is a tributary of the Red River of the North in southern Manitoba, Canada. It is part of the watershed of Hudson Bay (via Red River, Lake Winnipeg, and the Nelson River).

The river flows between the Roseau River and Seine River on the eastern side of the Red River. It flows east to west through the rural municipalities of Piney, La Broquerie, Stuartburn, Hanover, De Salaberry, Emerson - Franklin, and Ritchot, as well as the village of St-Pierre-Jolys. It joins the Red River approximately three kilometres northeast of Ste. Agathe, Manitoba. The river is dammed near the community of St. Malo, creating a reservoir known as St. Malo Lake. The northern part of this lake and surrounding land comprise St. Malo Provincial Park, which was designated as a park in 1961.

== See also ==
- Rat River (Burntwood River), a tributary of the Burntwood River and forms the north–south part of the Churchill River Diversion.
- List of rivers of Manitoba
