= Gravel Hill tram stop =

Tramlink tram stop in London, England

Gravel Hill
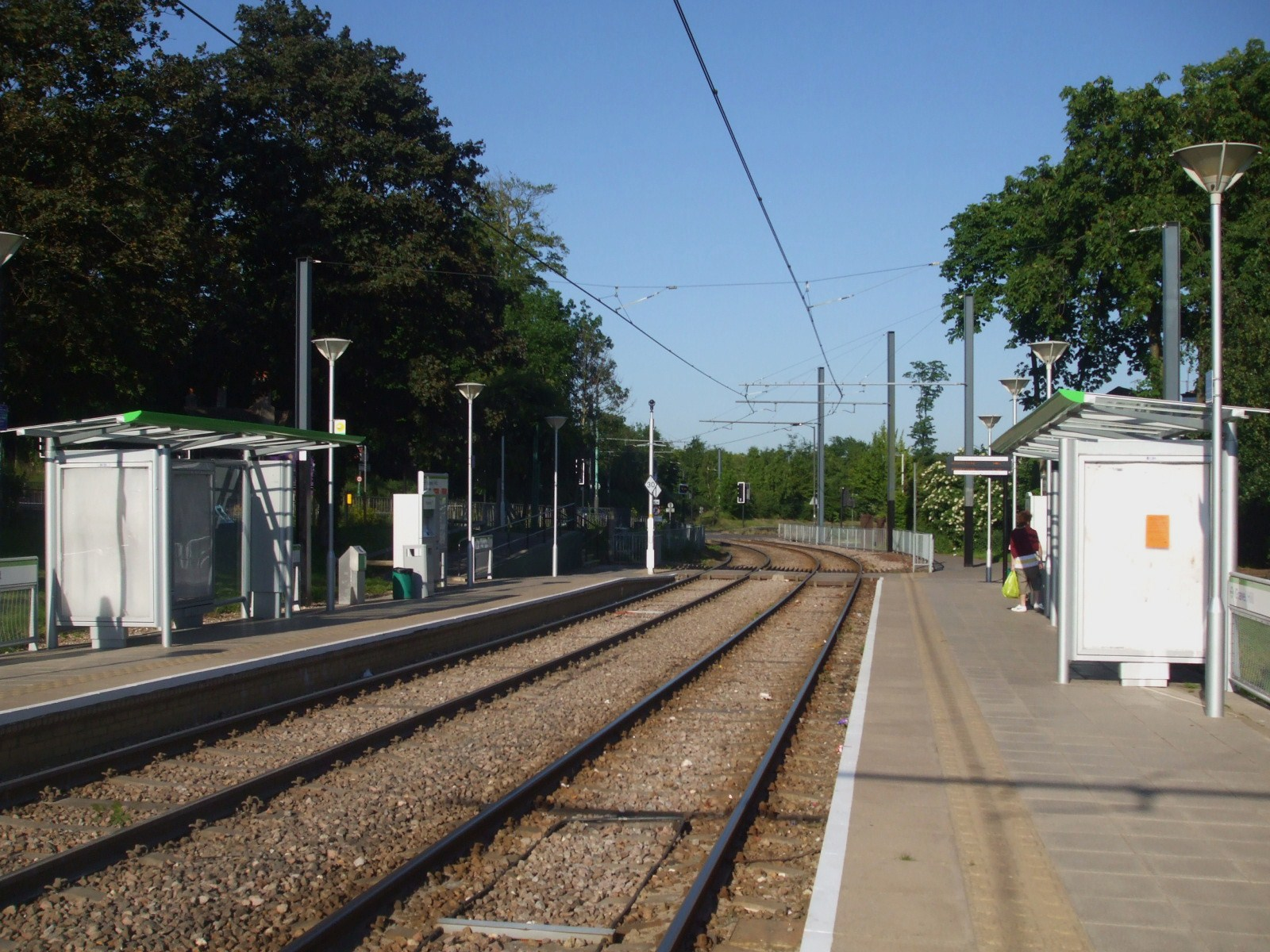
- Gravel Hill tram stop, looking east

General information
- Location: Gravel Hill, Addington, Croydon
- Coordinates: 51.35455°N 0.04314°W
- Operated by: Tramlink
- Platforms: 2

Construction
- Structure type: At-grade
- Accessible: Yes

Other information
- Status: Unstaffed
- Website: Official website

History
- Opened: 10 May 2000
Location
- Location in Croydon

Gravel Hill tram stop is a light rail stop serving Addington, in the London Borough of Croydon in the southern suburbs of London. It is the main destination for tourists visiting the historic site of Addington Palace. It is also used by students who attend John Ruskin College and is the nearest stop for Forestdale.

== Services ==
Gravel Hill is served by tram services operated by Tramlink. The tram stop is served by trams every 7-8 minutes between New Addington and West Croydon via East Croydon and Centrale.

A very small number of early morning and late evening services continue beyond Croydon to and from Therapia Lane and Wimbledon. During the evenings on weekends, the service is reduced to a tram every 15 minutes.

Services are operated using Bombardier CR4000 trams only [[Stadler Variobahn] Trams]] used to operate from New Addington via West Croydon but they don’t anymore

Preceding station	Tramlink	Following station
Coombe Lane towards West Croydon	Tramlink; New Addington to Croydon town centre	Addington Village towards New Addington

== Connections ==
The stop is served by London Buses routes 130 and 466 which provide connections to New Addington, Croydon Town Centre, Thornton Heath, Purley and Caterham.

Free interchange for journeys made within an hour is available between bus services and between buses and trams is available at Gravel Hill as part of Transport for London's Hopper Fare.
