= London Buses route 466 =

London bus route

466
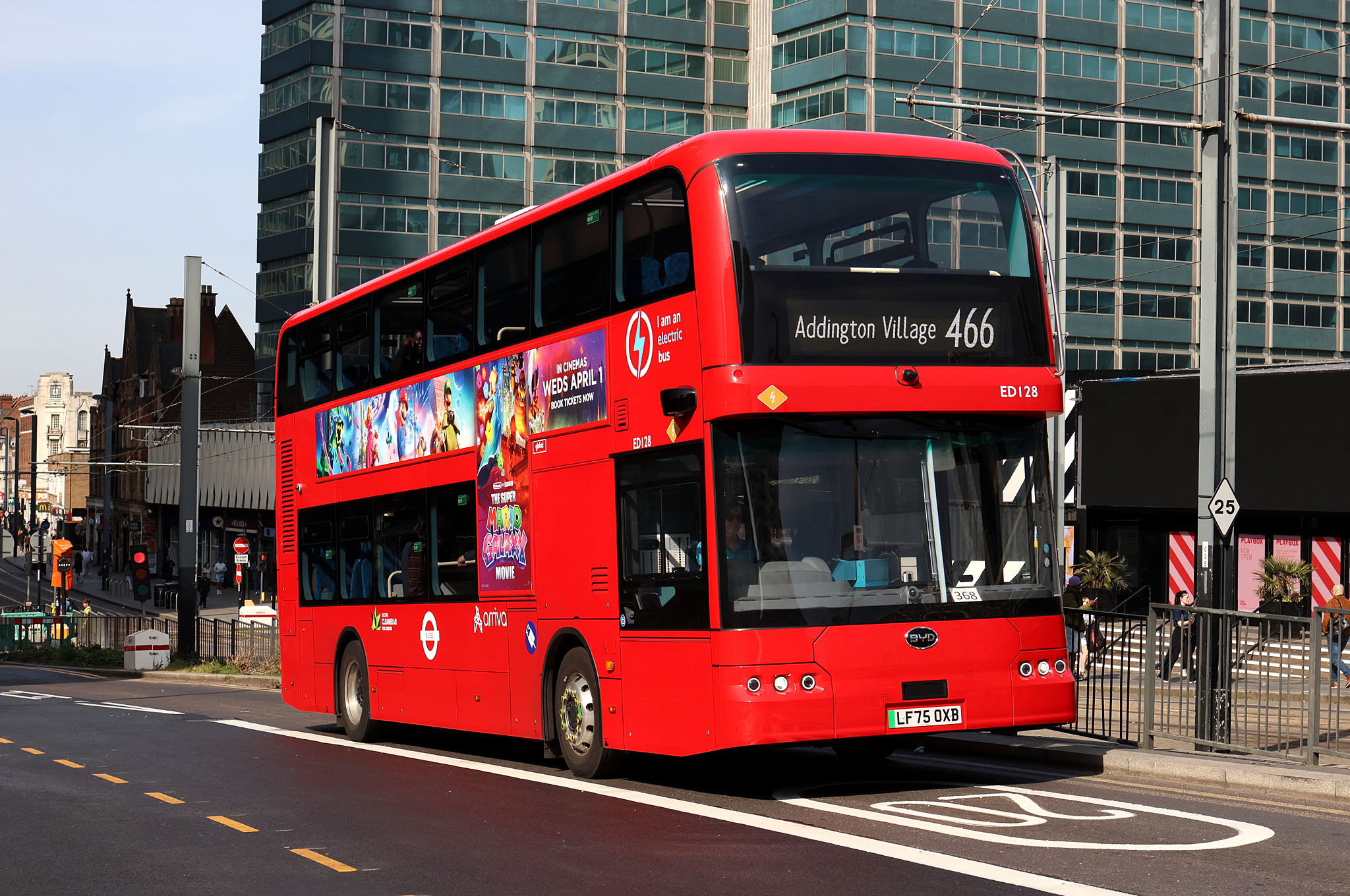
- Arriva London BYD BD11B at East Croydon station in April 2026

Overview
- Operator: Arriva London
- Garage: Croydon
- Vehicle: BYD BD11B
- Predecessors: Route 166; Route 400
- Former operator: Metrobus

Route
- Start: Caterham on the Hill
- Via: Old Coulsdon; Purley; Croydon; Shirley
- End: Addington Village Interchange
- Length: 12 miles (19 km)

Service
- Level: Daily
- Frequency: Every 12-15 minutes
- Journey time: 39-66 minutes
- Operates: 05:13 until 00:54

London Buses route 466 is a Transport for London contracted bus route in London and Surrey, England. Running between Caterham on the Hill and Addington Village Interchange, it is operated by Arriva London.

== History ==
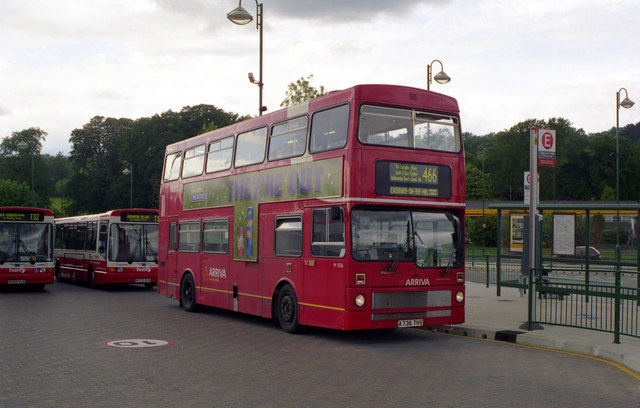
Arriva London MCW Metrobus at Addington Village Interchange in May 2000

Route 466 commenced on 29 August 1998 between Shirley and Caterham on the Hill replacing route 166 between Shirley and Croydon and route 400 between Croydon and Caterham. It was operated by Croydon garage with Leyland Olympians and MCW Metrobuses.

On 20 May 2000 the route was extended to Addington Village Interchange coinciding with the opening of the Tramlink. Upon being re-tendered, on 30 August 2003 it passed to Metrobus' Godstone garage with East Lancs bodied Scania OmniDekka's, moving to Croydon in early 2006.

On next being tendered it returned to Arriva London's Croydon garage on 30 August 2008 with new Alexander Dennis Enviro400s were introduced. Arriva have retained it in subsequent tenders commencing in August 2013 and August 2020.

Electrical problems on the vehicles led to reliability issues. In October 2008 the route was criticised for seeing too many southbound journeys turn short at Old Coulsdon. Residents began a petition to improve reliability on the route, receiving around 700 signatures by December 2008. On 17 January 2009, Arriva introduced extra vehicles to the 466 to allow longer layovers and reduce the need to turn journeys short.

== Current route ==
Route 466 operates via these primary locations:

- Caterham on the Hill
- Old Coulsdon
- Purley station
- South Croydon bus garage
- Croydon town centre
- East Croydon station
- Lebanon Road tram stop
- Sandilands tram stop
- Shirley
- Gravel Hill tram stop
- Addington Village Interchange
