= Sandilands =

Sandilands may refer to:

== People ==
=== Clans ===
- Clan Sandilands, a lowland Scottish kindred
- Sandilands is the surname of the Lords Torphichen, chief of Clan Sandilands

=== Surname ===
- Sandilands (surname)

== Places ==
- Sandilands, Lincolnshire, a hamlet on the East coast of England
- Sandilands tram stop, a stop on London's Tramlink light rail system
- Sandilands Provincial Forest in southeastern Manitoba, Canada
- Sandilands, South Australia, a locality on Yorke Peninsula

== Other ==
- Sandilands Community Primary School, in Manchester, England
