= Sandilands (surname) =

Sandilands is a surname, and may refer to:

- Aaron Sandilands, Australian rules footballer, born 1982
- Ben Sandilands (born 2003), British athlete
- Bruce Sandilands, Australian Paralympic athlete
- Catriona Sandilands, American academic
- James Sandilands (courtier) (died 1618), Scottish courtier
- James Walter Sandilands, British Army officer
- James Sandilands, 1st Lord Torphichen, Scottish nobleman
- James Sandilands, 1st Lord Abercrombie
- James Sandilands, 2nd Lord Abercrombie
- James Sandilands, 7th Lord Torphichen (died 1753), Scottish nobleman
- Kyle Sandilands, Australian radio and television personality
- Laurie Sandilands, Australian rules footballer
- Neil Sandilands, South African actor and filmmaker
- Rupert Sandilands, English footballer
- Wayne Sandilands, South African soccer player

== See also ==
- Sandland (surname)
