= Addington Village Interchange =

Tramlink tram stop in London, England

Addington Village
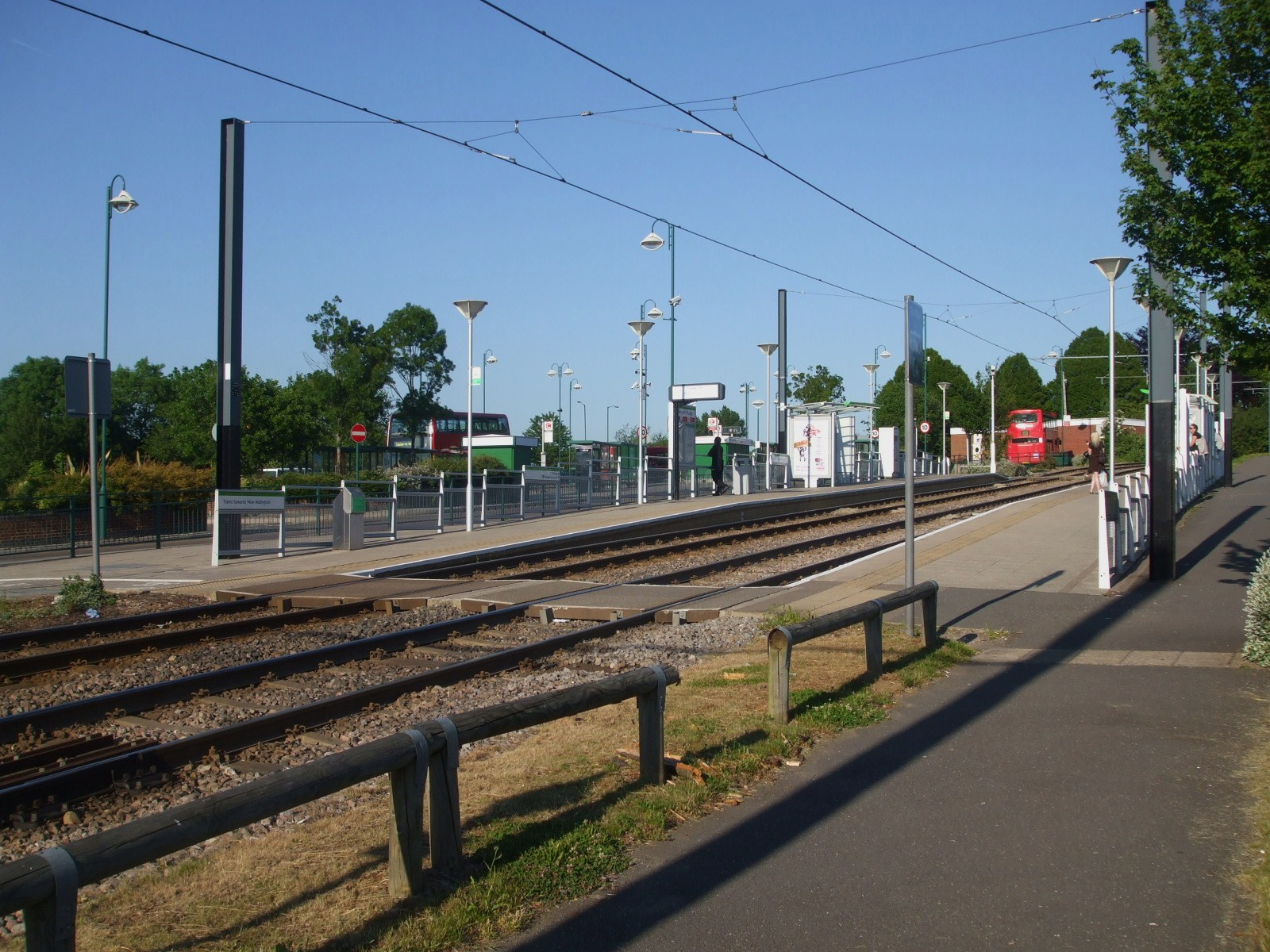
- The tram stop and bus station (in background)

General information
- Location: Addington Village, Croydon
- Coordinates: 51.356252°N 0.032966°W
- Operated by: Tramlink
- Platforms: 2

Construction
- Structure type: At-grade
- Accessible: Yes

Other information
- Status: Unstaffed
- Website: Official website

History
- Opened: 10 May 2000
Location
- Location in Croydon

Addington Village Interchange is a light rail stop and associated bus station serving Addington in the London Borough of Croydon in south London. It opened on 10 May 2000 along with the line to New Addington.

== Tramlink ==
Addington Village is served by tram services operated by Tramlink. The tram stop is served by trams every 7–8 minutes between New Addington and West Croydon via East Croydon and Centrale.

A very small number of early morning and late evening services continue beyond Croydon to and from Therapia Lane and Wimbledon. During the evenings on weekends, the service is reduced to a tram every 15 minutes.

Services are operated using Bombardier CR4000 and Stadler Variobahn Trams.

Preceding station	Tramlink	Following station
Gravel Hill towards West Croydon	Tramlink; New Addington to Croydon town centre	Fieldway towards New Addington

== Bus services ==
The bus station is served by London Buses routes 64, 130, 314, 353, 359, 433, 466 and school routes 654 and 664. These provide connections to New Addington, Croydon Town Centre, Purley, Caterham, Thornton Heath, Hayes, Orpington, Bromley and Eltham.

Free interchange for journeys made within an hour between bus services, and between buses and trams, is available at Addington Village as part of Transport for London's Hopper Fare.
