= Sandland (surname) =

Sandland is a surname, and may refer to:

- Aasmund Sandland (born 1949), Norwegian footballer
- Beau Sandland (born 1993), American football player
- Phil Sandland (1882–1970), Australian rules footballer
- Teddy Sandland (1873–1939), English footballer

== See also ==
- Sandilands (surname)
