= Sandilands tram stop =

Tramlink tram stop in London, England

Sandilands
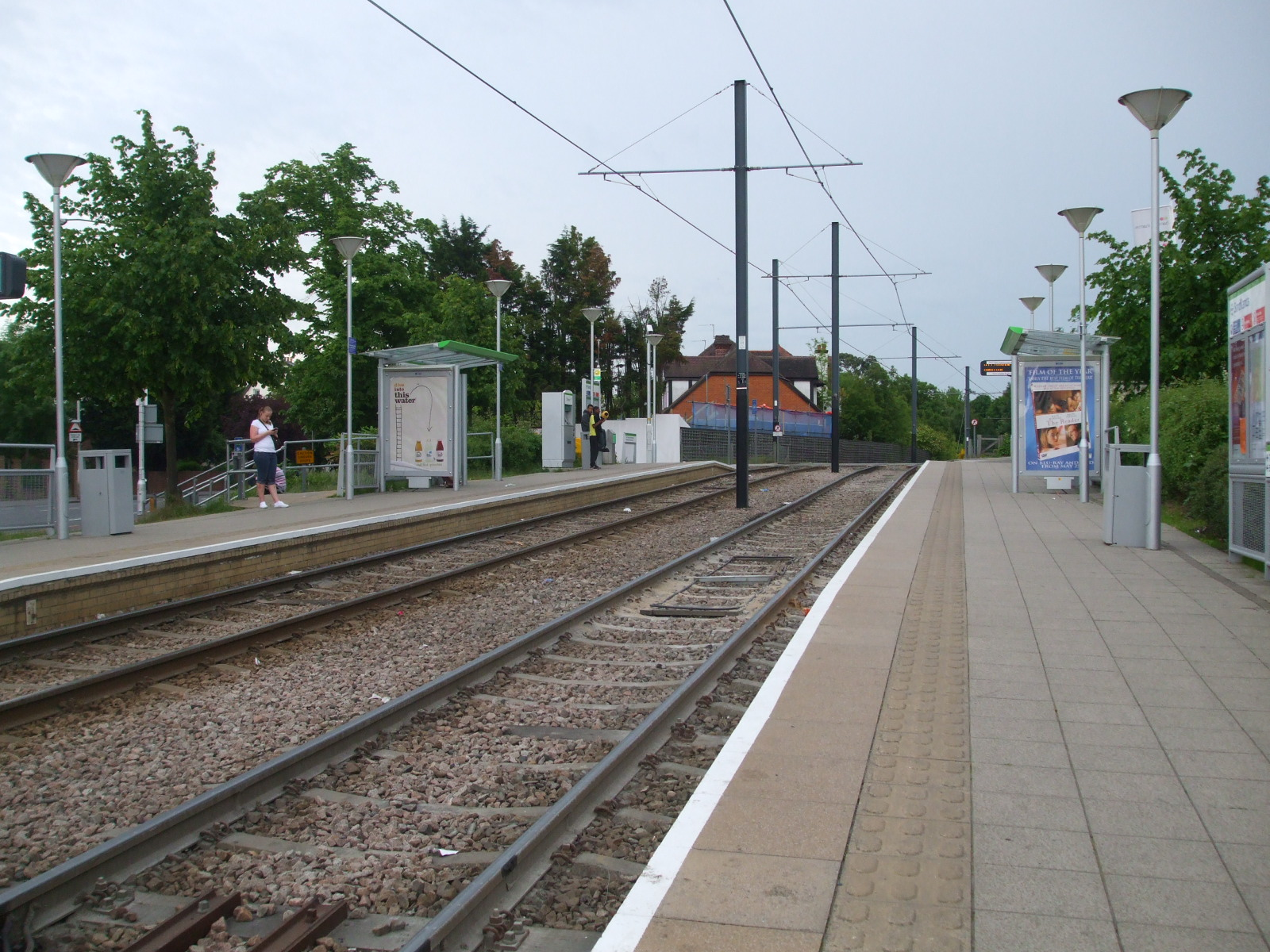
- Looking east

General information
- Location: Addiscombe Road, Croydon
- Coordinates: 51.37501°N 0.078200°W
- Operated by: Tramlink
- Platforms: 2

Construction
- Structure type: At-grade
- Accessible: Yes

Other information
- Status: Unstaffed
- Website: Official website

History
- Opened: 10 May 2000
Location
- Location in Croydon

Sandilands tram stop is a light rail stop in the London Borough of Croydon in the southern suburbs of London. It provides access to nearby residential neighbourhoods along Addiscombe Road, east of central Croydon. The stop is named after the adjacent Sandilands Tunnel.

== History ==
=== 2016 derailment ===
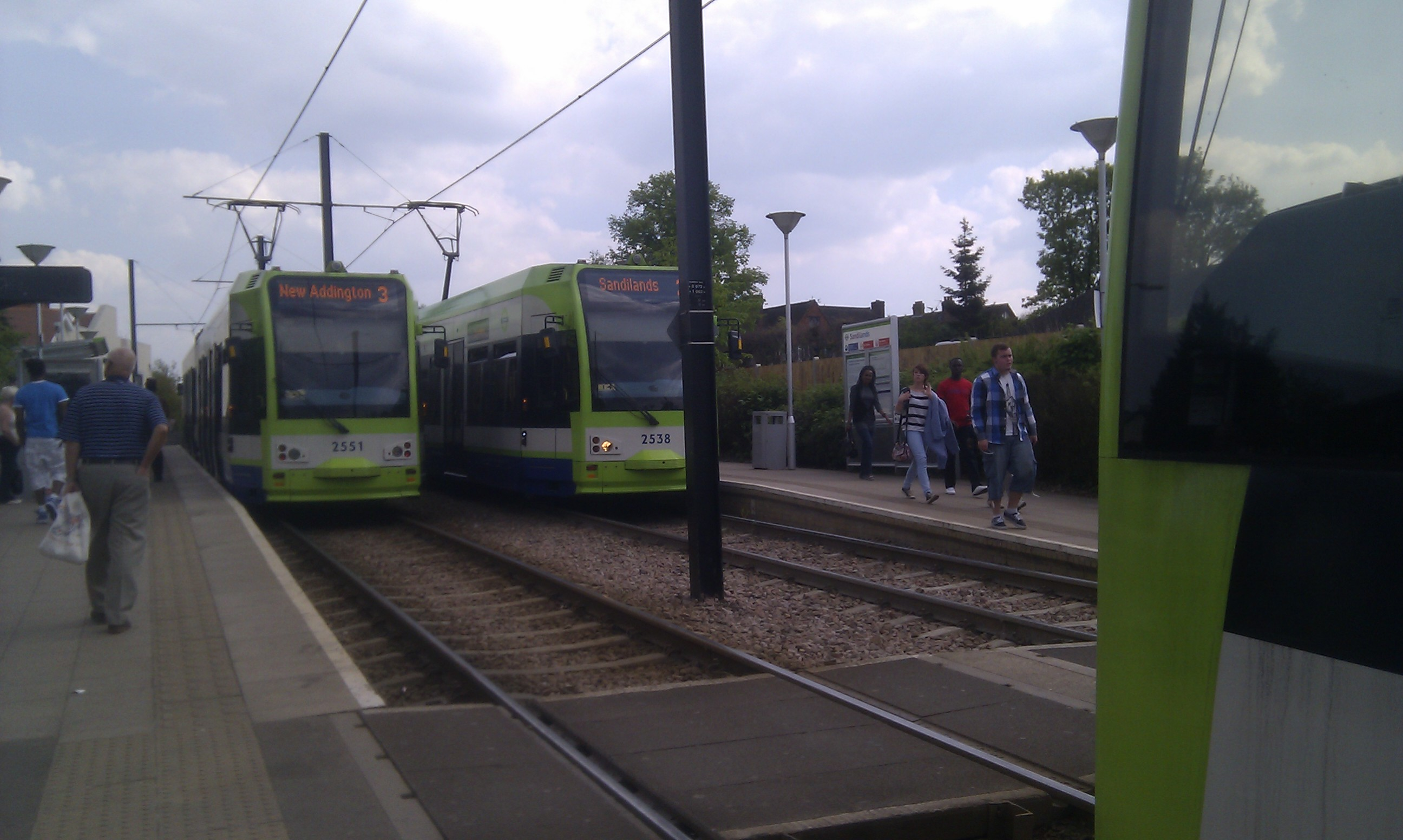
Trams waiting at Sandilands to reverse eastwards in 2011. Five years later, Tram 2551 (on the left) would be involved in a derailment in the area.

Early in the morning of 9 November 2016, seven people died and more than 50 were injured when a tram derailed and rolled over at Sandilands junction, 150 metres (490 ft) southeast of the tram stop where two lines converge with a sharp bend, after having just passed through Sandilands Tunnel.

== Design ==
Immediately to the east of the tram stop, the line descends in cutting to a junction with the trackbed of the former Woodside and South Croydon Railway. To the west of the stop, the line runs alongside Addiscombe Road on a reserved track as far as the junction with Chepstow Road. From Chepstow Road the line runs within Addiscombe Road, sharing road space with buses and local traffic.

The area of Sandilands tram stop was one of the few places where property demolition was needed during the construction of Tramlink, in order to make way for both the stop and the cutting link to the former railway line.

== Location ==
London Buses routes 119, 194, 198 and 466 serve bus stops near the tram stop. Free interchange for journeys made within an hour is available between trams and buses as part of Transport for London's Hopper fare.

== Services ==
The typical off-peak service in trams per hour from Sandilands is:

- 6 tph in each direction between Beckenham Junction and Wimbledon
- 6 tph in each direction between Elmers End and Wimbledon
- 8 tph in each direction between New Addington and West Croydon

Services are operated using Bombardier CR4000 and Stadler Variobahn model low-floor trams.

Preceding station	Tramlink	Following station
Lebanon Road towards Wimbledon	Tramlink; Wimbledon to Beckenham Junction	Addiscombe towards Beckenham Junction
Lebanon Road towards Wimbledon	Tramlink; Wimbledon to Elmers End	Addiscombe towards Elmers End
Lebanon Road towards West Croydon	Tramlink; New Addington to Croydon town centre	Lloyd Park towards New Addington
