= East Croydon station =

National rail station and Tramlink tram stop in London

East Croydon
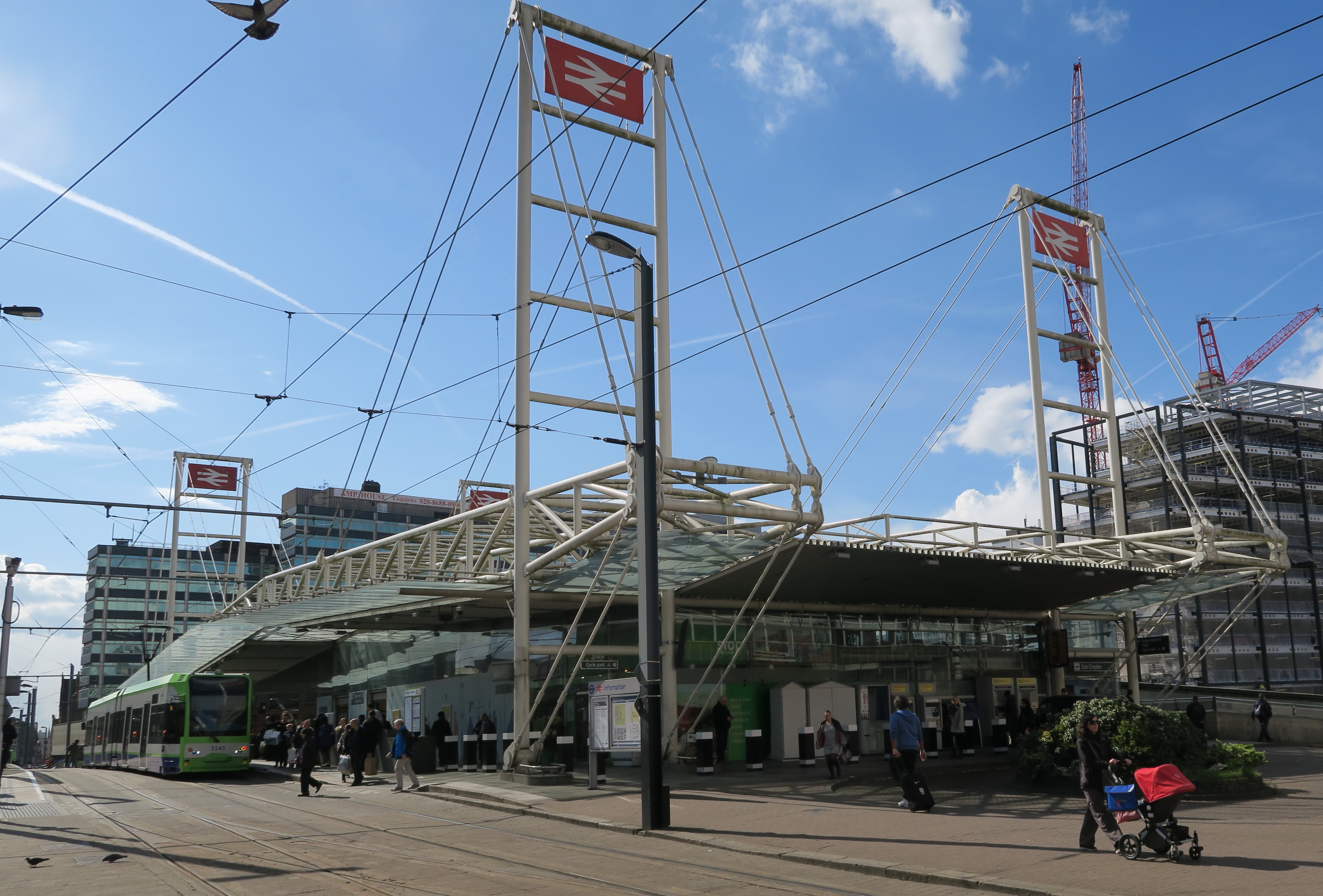
- East Croydon station and Tramlink stop
- Interactive map of East Croydon

General information
- Location: Croydon
- Local authority: London Borough of Croydon
- Grid reference: TQ 3288 6574
- Managed by: GTR Southern; Transport for London (tram platforms)
- Owners: Network Rail; Transport for London
- Station code: ECR
- DfT category: B
- Number of platforms: 6 plus 3 Tramlink platforms
- Accessible: Yes
- Fare zone: 5

National Rail annual entry and exit
- 2020–21: ▼6.695 million
- Interchange: ▼0.972 million
- 2021–22: ▲14.504 million
- Interchange: ▲2.604 million
- 2022–23: ▲18.514 million
- Interchange: ▲3.933 million
- 2023–24: ▲19.605 million
- Interchange: ▼3.339 million
- 2024–25: ▲20.592 million
- Interchange: ▲3.709 million

Railway companies
- Original company: London & Brighton Railway
- Pre-grouping: London, Brighton & South Coast Railway
- Post-grouping: Southern Railway

Key dates
- 12 July 1841: Opened as "Croydon"
- July 1846: Renamed "Croydon East"
- 1 May 1862: Renamed "East Croydon"
- 1898: Expanded to 6 platforms
- 1 June 1909: Renamed "East Croydon Main"
- July 1924: Amalgamated with "East Croydon Local" to form "East Croydon"
- 19 August 1992: New station building opened
- 14 May 2000: Tramlink stop opened

Other information
- External links: Departures; Facilities
- Coordinates: 51.3752°N 0.0923°W

East Croydon is a railway station, tram stop and associated bus station in Croydon, Greater London, England. It is located in London fare zone 5. At 10 miles 28 chains (10.35 mi; 16.66 km) from London Bridge, it is the 20th busiest station in Britain, was the 10th busiest in 2020–21 (due to the COVID pandemic), is the busiest national rail station in London outside of fare zones 1 and 2 and is one of the busiest non-terminal stations in the country. It is one of three railway stations in the London Borough of Croydon with Croydon in their name, the others being West Croydon and South Croydon. A Tramlink tram stop is located immediately outside the main station entrance.

The present station building opened on 19 August 1992. It consists of a large steel and glass frame suspended from a lightweight steel structure that straddles the track and platforms to a much greater extent than was possible with its Victorian predecessor. Four steel ladder masts anchor the glass box and the whole gives the impression of a suspension bridge that stretches into the distance. External canopies cover the entrances, a café's open-air seating area and the approaches to the tram stop. 440 m^{2} (4,700 sq ft) of glass were used in the roof and 800 m^{2} (8,600 sq ft) for the wall glazing.

It was announced in 2010 that Network Rail had proposed a £20m project to revamp the station with an additional entrance and a shortcut into the town centre. The new bridge was officially opened in December 2013. Disabled-accessible slopes to all platforms are provided and there is a footbridge connecting all platforms. There are refreshment stalls and vending machines in the seating areas on the platforms, and trolleys are available along with step-free access to buffets. There are electronic information displays showing departures to 80 stations.

== History ==
The population of Croydon increased 14-fold (from 16,700 to 233,000) between the opening of the station in 1841 and 1921. As a result, the station has been enlarged and rebuilt on several occasions.

=== Opening ===
On 12 July 1841, the London & Brighton Railway (L&BR) began passenger services through Croydon station (now East Croydon) on the Brighton Line from London Bridge to Haywards Heath. The station was designed by the architect David Mocatta, the second station in the town since the London and Croydon Railway (L&CR) had opened its Croydon station (now West Croydon) in June 1839.

The station became jointly administered by the L&BR and the South Eastern Railway (SER) in 1842, who shared the Brighton Main Line as far as Redhill. Fares from Croydon to London were common to two railways. In 1846, the L&BR and the L&CR amalgamated to form the London, Brighton and South Coast Railway (LB&SCR), and the two stations were shortly renamed East Croydon and West Croydon to avoid confusion.

=== New Croydon ===
With the completion of the line to Victoria between 1860 and 1862, extra platforms were needed to provide a terminal for LB&SCR suburban services to and from the West End of London whilst London Bridge trains continued to use the existing lines. The new platforms adjoined East Croydon but were treated by the LB&SCR as a separate station named New Croydon, with its own ticket office, and which ran exclusively LBSCR services. This device enabled the railway to avoid breaking an agreement with the SER, whilst offering cheaper fares than the SER from the original station.

The terminal platforms at New Croydon proved difficult to operate, as there was limited space for locomotives to run around their trains. As a result, in 1863 the LB&SCR obtained Parliamentary authority to build a one-mile (1.6 km) extension to a new terminus at South Croydon, which provided the additional operating room.

=== Central Croydon ===
In 1864, the LB&SCR obtained authorisation to construct a 0.5-mile (0.8 km) long branch line into the town centre near Katharine Street, where Central Croydon station was built. The line opened in 1868 but enjoyed little success and closed in 1871, only to reopen in 1886 under pressure from the council before finally closing in 1890. It was demolished and replaced by the town hall.

=== 1894/95 rebuilding ===
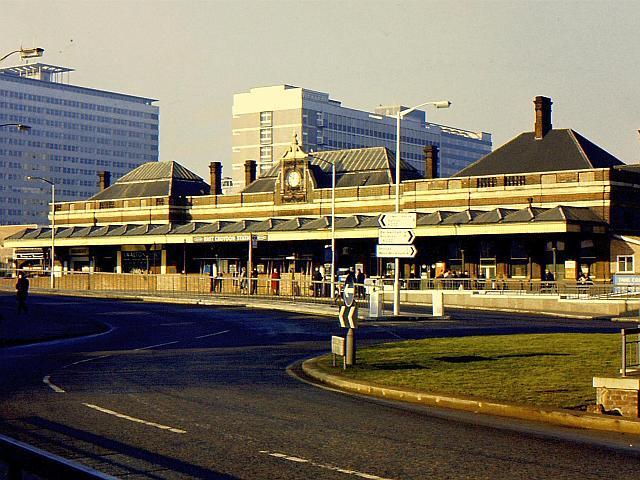
East Croydon station in 1967

By the late 1880s the station was again congested due to the growth of traffic on the main lines, the expansion of the suburban network in South London and the new line from Croydon to Oxted. As a result, the station was rebuilt and the tracks remodelled during 1894/5. At the same time the suburban lines were extended from South Croydon to Coulsdon North, where they joined the new Quarry line. In 1897–98, East Croydon and New Croydon were merged into a single station with the three island platforms that remain. The two stations kept separate booking accounts until the formation of the Southern Railway.

=== 1958 incident ===
On 4 July 1958, a passenger fell onto the running lines after attempting to leave his train on the wrong side. Station foreman Thomas Ashby saw that he was reaching for the live rail as he attempted to stand, and that an express train was approaching, and so jumped down onto the track and held the man down, safely, as the express passed. For his actions, Ashby was awarded the Order of Industrial Heroism, which was presented to him in the S.R.A. Club Hall at the station, on 7 October the same year.

=== 1992 rebuilding ===
The present station building opened on 19 August 1992. It consists of a large steel and glass frame suspended from a lightweight steel structure that straddles the track and platforms to a much greater extent than was possible with its Victorian predecessor.

Four steel ladder masts anchor the glass box and the whole gives the impression of a suspension bridge that stretches into the distance. External canopies cover the entrances, a café's open-air seating area and the approaches to the tram stop. 440 m^{2} (4,700 sq ft) of glass were used in the roof and 800 m^{2} (8,600 sq ft) for the wall glazing. The architects were Alan Brookes Associates and the structural engineers YRM Anthony Hunt Associates.

=== 2010 revamp plans ===
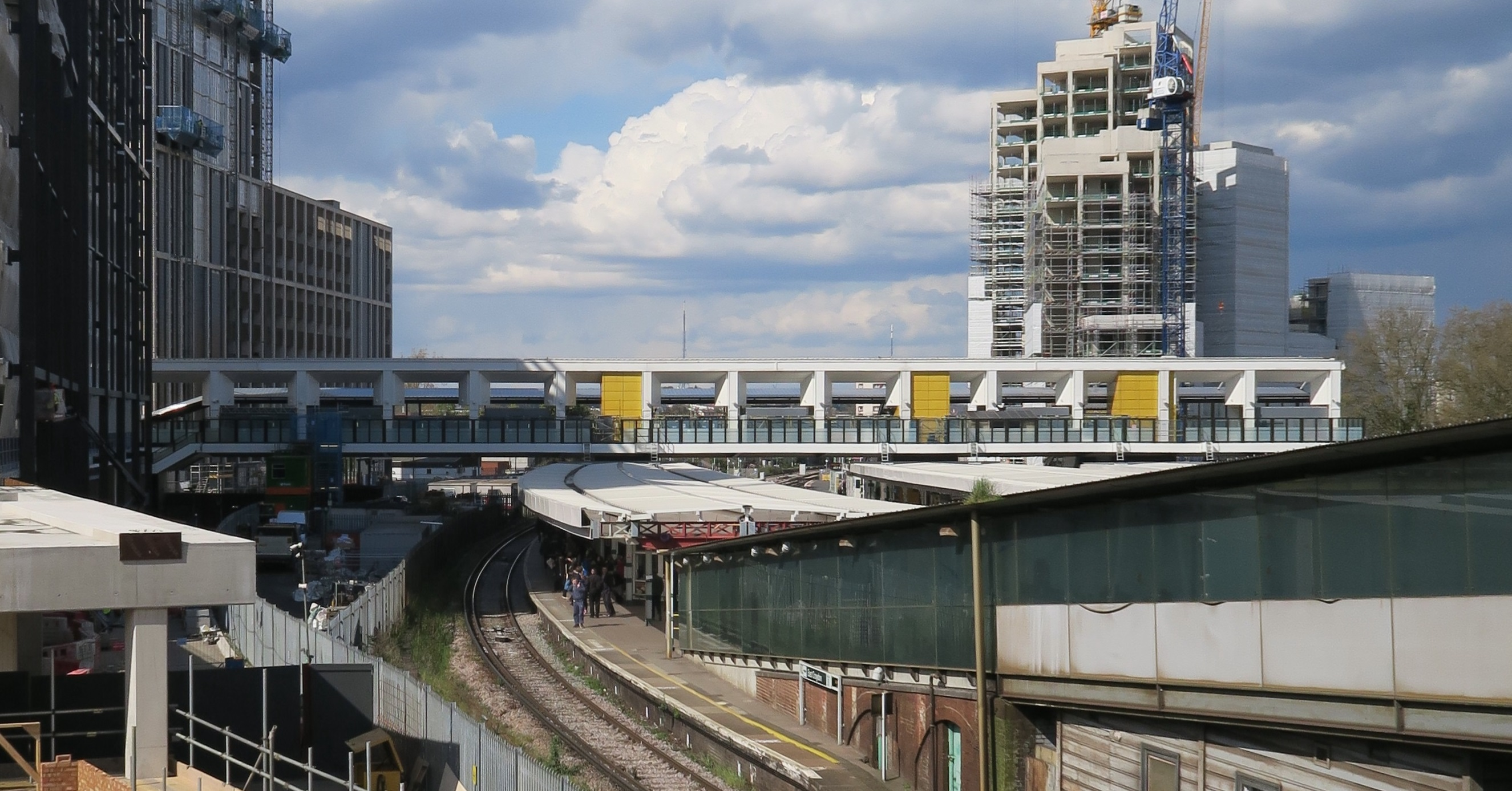
East Croydon station footbridge, installed 2013

It was announced in 2010 that Network Rail had proposed a £20m project to revamp the station with an additional entrance and a shortcut into the town centre. In September 2010, Croydon Council pledged £6m towards the revamp, ensuring that a bridge was included in the plans. The new bridge was officially opened in December 2013, providing pedestrian transfer between platforms as well as a new entrance at the northern end of the platforms and a more direct link to the town centre. The new walkway may be accessed from the town centre on the west via Lansdowne Walk, with access from Cherry Orchard Road on the east included in local development plans.

=== Thameslink Programme ===
The Thameslink Programme (formerly Thameslink 2000) was a £6 billion major project to expand the Thameslink network from 51 to 172 stations spreading northwards to Bedford, Peterborough, Cambridge and King's Lynn. The project included the lengthening of platforms, station remodelling, new railway infrastructure (e.g. viaducts and tunnels) and new rolling stock. The project was completed in 2020 and has enabled 8 Thameslink trains per hour in each direction to service East Croydon.

== Services ==
=== Destinations ===
The station has frequent services on the Brighton Main Line from London to Gatwick Airport and Brighton, the Thameslink Route from Brighton to Bedford via London Bridge, and the Oxted Line to East Grinstead and Uckfield. East Croydon serves destinations mainly in East Sussex, West Sussex, Surrey and Brighton & Hove, including Gatwick Airport, Horsham, Caterham, Tattenham Corner, Brighton, Reigate, Redhill, Hastings, Eastbourne, Bognor Regis, Portsmouth, Tonbridge and many suburban stations in South London.

Trains include Thameslink services to Brighton, Redhill, Bedford, Luton and London Luton Airport, which means that the station has direct services to two airports. They also serve stations in or near the City of London, including St Pancras International, Farringdon, City Thameslink and London Blackfriars.

Southeastern to London Charing Cross and Hastings occasionally call at the station during periods of engineering work.

=== Platforms ===
National Rail platforms

There are six platforms in the National Rail station in form of three islands numbered from the west to the east.

Platforms 1, 2, 4 are northbound platforms, with 1 and 2 on the fast line and 4 on the slow line, while platforms 3, 5, 6 are southbound platforms, with 3 on the fast line and 5 and 6 on the slow line.

Tramlink platforms

There are 3 Tram platforms. Platform 1 is used for trams towards Elmers End, Beckenham Junction and New Addington. Platform 2 is not routinely used although some trams may stop at this platform, mainly is used for trams which are on diversion and terminate at East Croydon occasionally. Platform 3 is used for trams towards Wimbledon and West Croydon (loop).

=== Former services ===
Services from London Bridge to Tunbridge Wells via Redhill were operated by Southeastern until December 2008, when they were transferred to Southern and curtailed at Tonbridge. In 2018, Southern withdrew the Victoria to Tonbridge via Redhill service, instead opting to run an hourly shuttle between Redhill and Tonbridge.

CrossCountry services stopped at East Croydon on the route to Brighton and Newcastle, until they were withdrawn in December 2008 (after the franchise passed from Virgin to Arriva)

Southern services to London Charing Cross were withdrawn in December 2009.

=== Current services ===
==== Southern ====
The typical off-peak service in trains per hour as of December 2022 is:

- 10 tph to London Victoria (calling at Clapham Junction only)
- 5 tph to London Bridge (1 of these runs non-stop, 2 calling only at Norwood Junction and 2 run calling at all stations via Norbury)
- 2 tph to Caterham and Tattenham Corner, dividing and attaching at Purley
- 2 tph to East Grinstead via Oxted
- 1 tph to Uckfield (non stop to Oxted)
- 2 tph to Reigate via Redhill
- 2 tph to Portsmouth Harbour and Bognor Regis, dividing and attaching at Horsham
- 2 tph to Littlehampton via Worthing
- 2 tph to Eastbourne with one continuing to Ore via Hastings
- 1 tph to Watford Junction

Southern services at East Croydon are operated using Class 377 EMUs and Class 171 DMUs.

==== Thameslink ====
The typical off-peak service in trains per hour as of December 2022 is:

- 4 tph to Bedford via London Bridge
- 2 tph to Cambridge
- 2 tph to Peterborough
- 4 tph to Brighton
- 2 tph to Three Bridges via Redhill
- 2 tph to Horsham via Redhill
- 1tph to Gatwick Airport via Redhill

Thameslink services at East Croydon are operated using Class 700 EMUs.

==== Tramlink ====
The typical off-peak service in trams per hour from East Croydon is:

- 6 tph in each direction between Beckenham Junction and Wimbledon
- 6 tph in each direction between Elmers End and Wimbledon
- 8 tph in each direction between New Addington and West Croydon

Services are operated using Bombardier CR4000 and Stadler Variobahn model low-floor trams.

Preceding station	National Rail	Following station
London Bridge	Thameslink: Brighton Main Line; Fast Services	Gatwick Airport
London Bridge	Thameslink: Bedford to East Grinstead via London Bridge Line; Peak Hours Only	South Croydon
Norwood Junction or London Bridge	Thameslink: Brighton Main Line; Stopping Services	South Croydon or Coulsdon South
Clapham Junction	Southern North Downs Line	Purley
Clapham Junction	Southern: Brighton Main Line; Fast Services	Gatwick Airport
Norwood Junction or Selhurst	Southern: Brighton Main Line; Stopping Services	South Croydon or Purley
Clapham Junction or London Bridge	Southern Oxted Line	South Croydon or Sanderstead or Oxted
Preceding station	Tramlink	Following station
Wellesley Road One-way operation	Tramlink; Wimbledon to Beckenham Junction	Lebanon Road towards Beckenham Junction
George Street towards Wimbledon	Tramlink; Wimbledon to Beckenham Junction	Lebanon Road towards Beckenham Junction
Wellesley Road One-way operation	Tramlink; Wimbledon to Elmers End	Lebanon Road towards Elmers End
George Street towards Wimbledon	Tramlink; Wimbledon to Elmers End	Lebanon Road towards Elmers End
Wellesley Road One-way operation	Tramlink; New Addington to Croydon town centre	Lebanon Road towards New Addington
George Street towards West Croydon	Tramlink; New Addington to Croydon town centre	Lebanon Road towards New Addington

== Facilities ==
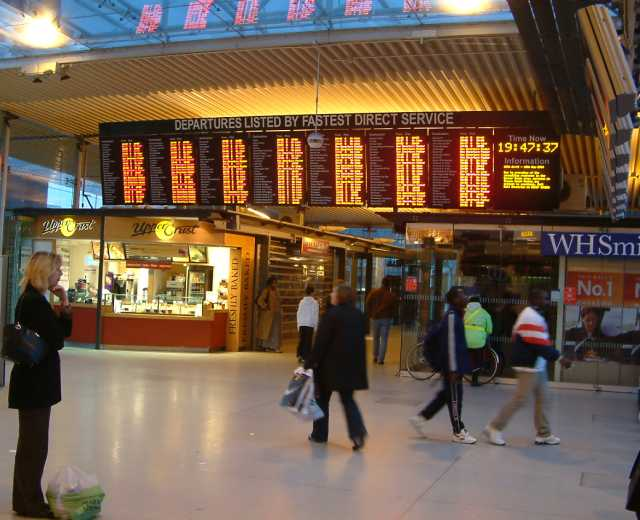
Electronic information board and shops on the concourse on 27 April 2004

The main entrance is from George Street. Another entrance is next to the taxi rank on Billinton Hill just off Cherry Orchard Road, on the east side. There are several shops within the main building.

After the new bridge was opened in 2013 (see 2010 revamp plans, above) a further entrance became available with a walkway leading to the junction of Lansdowne Road and Dingwall Road.

The ticket office and the ticket machines usually become busy during peak hours. Disabled-accessible slopes to all platforms are provided and there is a footbridge connecting all platforms. There are three waiting rooms on the platforms with standard metal seats. There are refreshment stalls and vending machines in the seating areas on the platforms. Trolleys are available along with step-free access to buffets.

Oyster Pay as you go (PAYG) and contactless payments are accepted on journeys within London Travelcard zones.

There are electronic information displays showing departures to 80 stations.

== Future ==
=== Station expansion ===
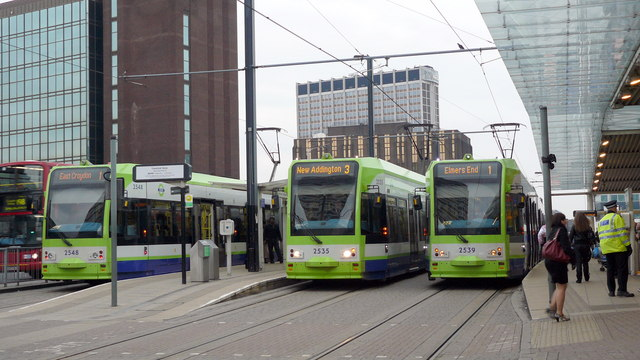
All three tracks of the trams in use at the East Croydon stop

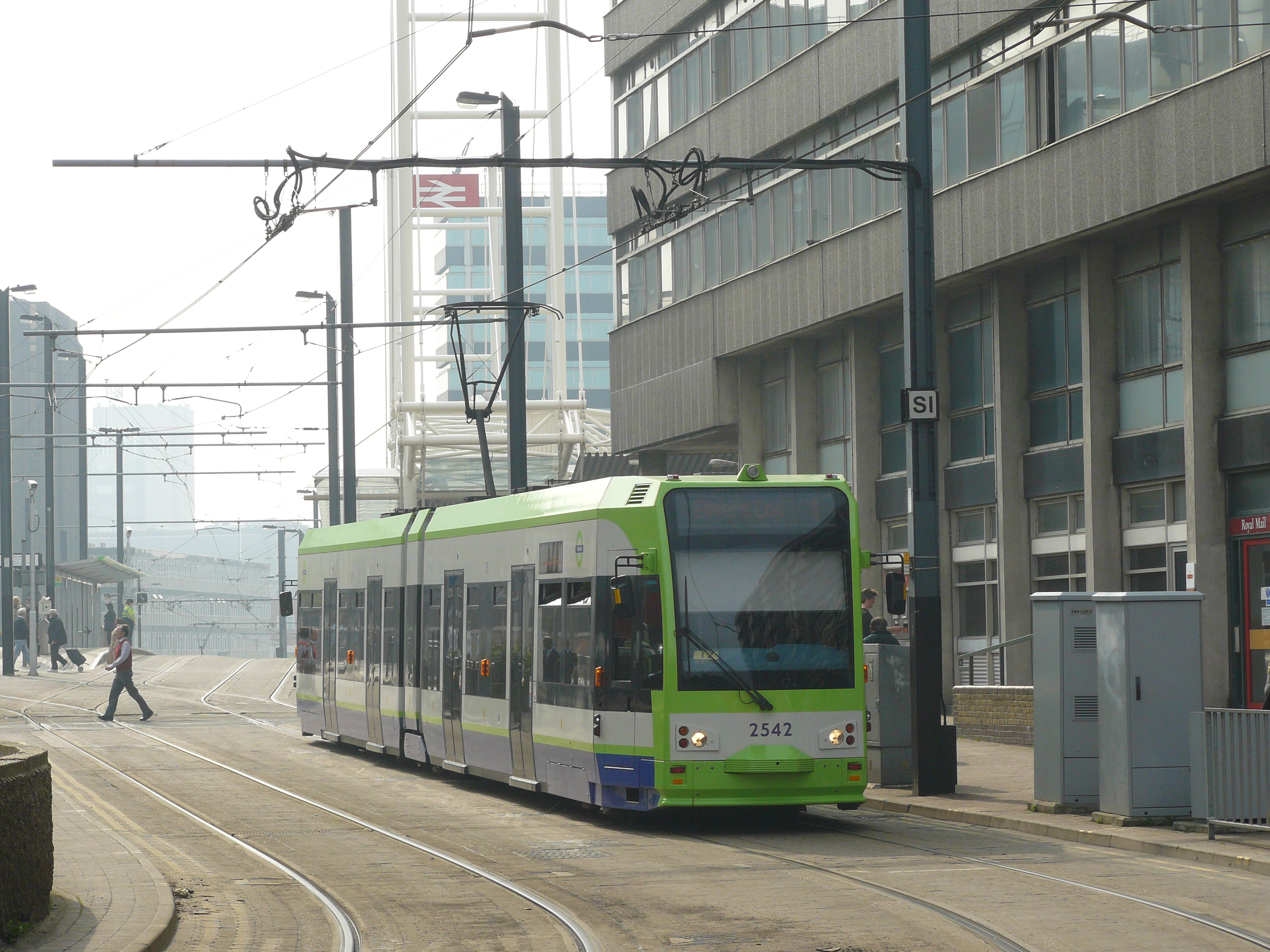
A tram having just left East Croydon

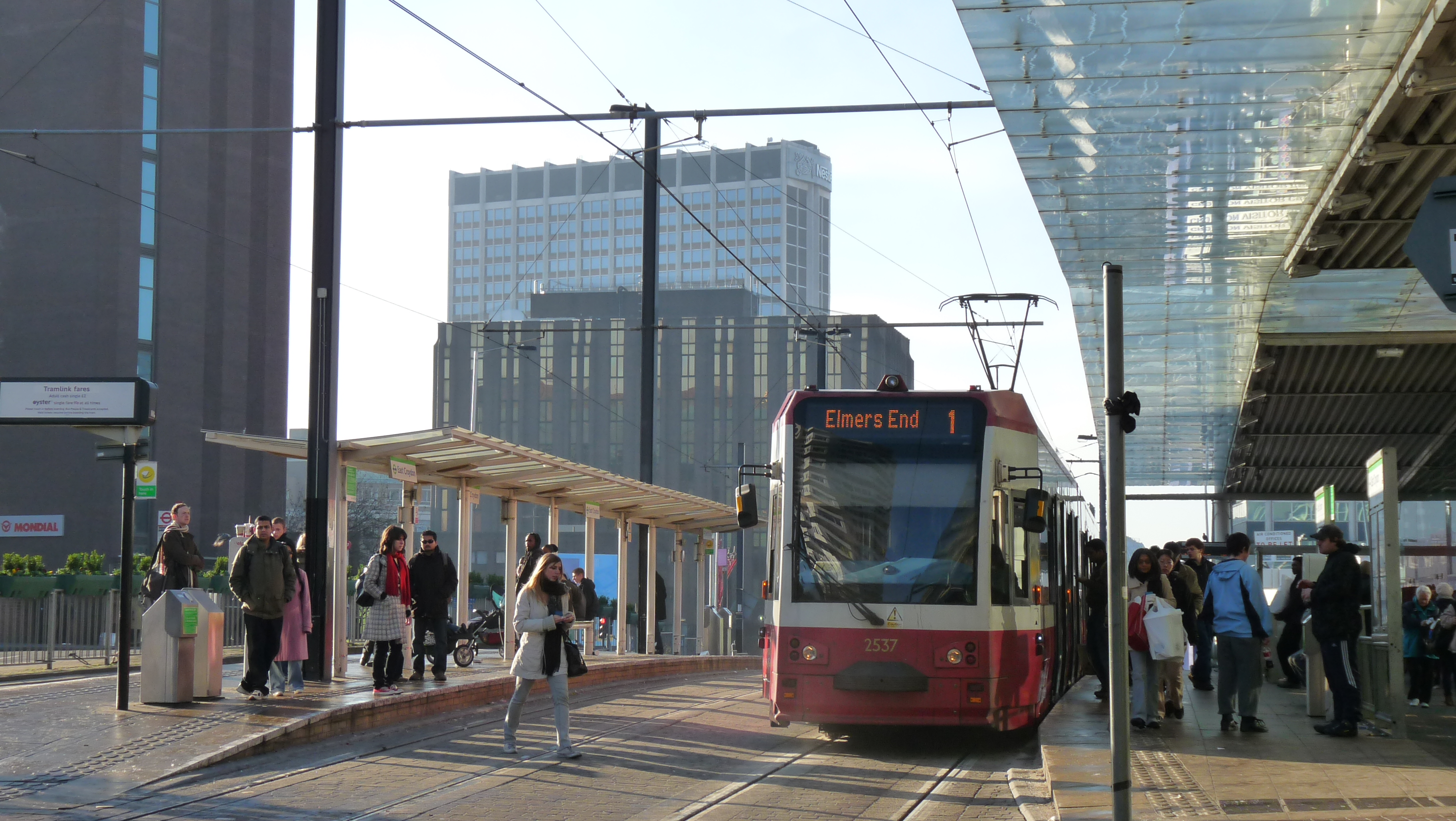
Tramlink service in December 2008

Several plans for station expansion have been put forward; none of which were confirmed to be happening by January 2015.

As part of the Croydon Vision 2020 regeneration scheme, East Croydon is expected be expanded to both the west and the east. Work has been planned on the west side for some time to increase station capacity, made more urgent by likely additional traffic from the planned Croydon Gateway nearby. A proposal by Arrowcroft, which included the 12,500-seat Croydon Arena, was rejected in August 2008. Arrowcroft had proposed a £24 million expansion of the station with a new 'airport style' concourse above the tracks to the north of the station. Arrowcroft had agreed to contribute £500,000 to the build costs to offset the impact of their proposed Arena. The source of the remaining £23.5 million was not identified, and Network Rail had not committed this expenditure in its capital plans.

The alternative scheme called Ruskin Square, by the owners of the site Stanhope Schroders, includes a planned contribution of £1.1 million for station capacity improvements that could be quickly implemented and integrated into their planned scheme for a new urban park, a rebuilt Warehouse Theatre, a doctors' surgery, housing (50% "affordable") and modern offices on the Croydon Gateway site.

To the east, towards Cherry Orchard Road, the proposed towers result in an extension to the station. The architect is Make with the client Menta, engineer Knight Frank and GL Hearn. Originally the project was planned to start in 2009, but this was later put back to 2019. The mixed-use scheme is for approximately 93,000 sq m (1 million sq ft) of accommodation in a series of crystalline towers. Some 70% of the area is planned to be residential accommodation, with the remaining 30% mixed commercial use, including offices and retail. Critical to all proposals are improvements to transport interchange. No project has yet delivered the necessary funds for significant enhancements.

In 2020, Network Rail revealed a proposal to move the station 100m north as part of a redevelopment of the nearby Selhurst Triangle junction, with the aim of increasing capacity and improving reliability. The rebuilt station would have two more platforms than today's station. The project is currently unfunded but if it goes ahead it is hoped that the redeveloped station and junction would be complete by 2033.

=== Renaming proposal ===
In late 2014 plans were made to rename the station "Croydon Central".

=== Proposed rezoning ===
East Croydon station is currently located in London fare zone 5, but there is an ongoing campaign for East Croydon and the smaller West Croydon station (also located in Zone 5) to be rezoned to London fare zone 4. It has been argued that the stations should be in Zone 4 because some stations currently in Zone 4 are further away from Central London, and that rezoning the stations will save commuters living in Croydon large amounts of money, attract investment to Croydon, create jobs in the town and make living in the area more attractive. It is expected that those commuting to Croydon would be largely unaffected by such a change. The issue has been debated in the House of Commons, but current train operator Southern has not formally submitted a proposal for such a change to Transport for London, which is required for a station to be rezoned.

=== New entrance on Cherry Orchard Road ===
A new entrance to the station was included as part of the Morello Quarter Phase II development being constructed to the east of the station, the plans stating: "New pedestrian entrance into East Croydon Station via a high quality landscaped public space, new stairs and a temporary link structure connecting to the existing station bridge"; however, at the East Croydon Community Organisation AGM on 16 July 2024, it was revealed by representatives of Network Rail that no ticket barrier would be installed by Network Rail at the Cherry Orchard Road (eastern) side of the bridge due to the cost of installation and subsequent staffing & maintenance. At the same AGM, it was also noted that Network Rail may review the provision of ticket barriers at the station in the future.

== Selhurst Depot ==
There is a large railway depot for Southern and Thameslink trains to the north at Selhurst.

== Transport connections ==
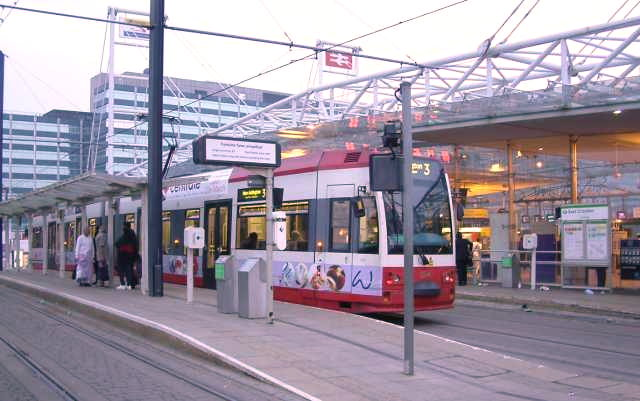
The Tramlink tram interchange outside the station on 27 April 2004

East Croydon is well served by both tram and bus, with a tram stop outside and a bus station close by. London Buses services reach Central London, Purley Way, Bromley, Lewisham and places to the south. Route SL7, the longest London bus route, runs to Heathrow Airport via Sutton and Kingston.

Immediately outside the station is the Tramlink stop, with services to Elmers End, Beckenham Junction, New Addington and Wimbledon. A major interchange, East Croydon has three tram platforms, two on an island, the other backing on to the station entrance. Following problems with the points in this area, in August 2006 they were fixed to route all eastbound trams into Platform 1, the concourse-side platform. The island platform can be used only by westbound trams and by trams terminating from the east.

== Crime ==
In January 2006 the London Assembly issued statistics of crime in main-line railway stations outside Zone 1. East Croydon, Clapham Junction and Walthamstow Central were the worst affected. Both councils and railway companies were blamed.
