= New Addington tram stop =

Tramlink tram stop in London, England

New Addington
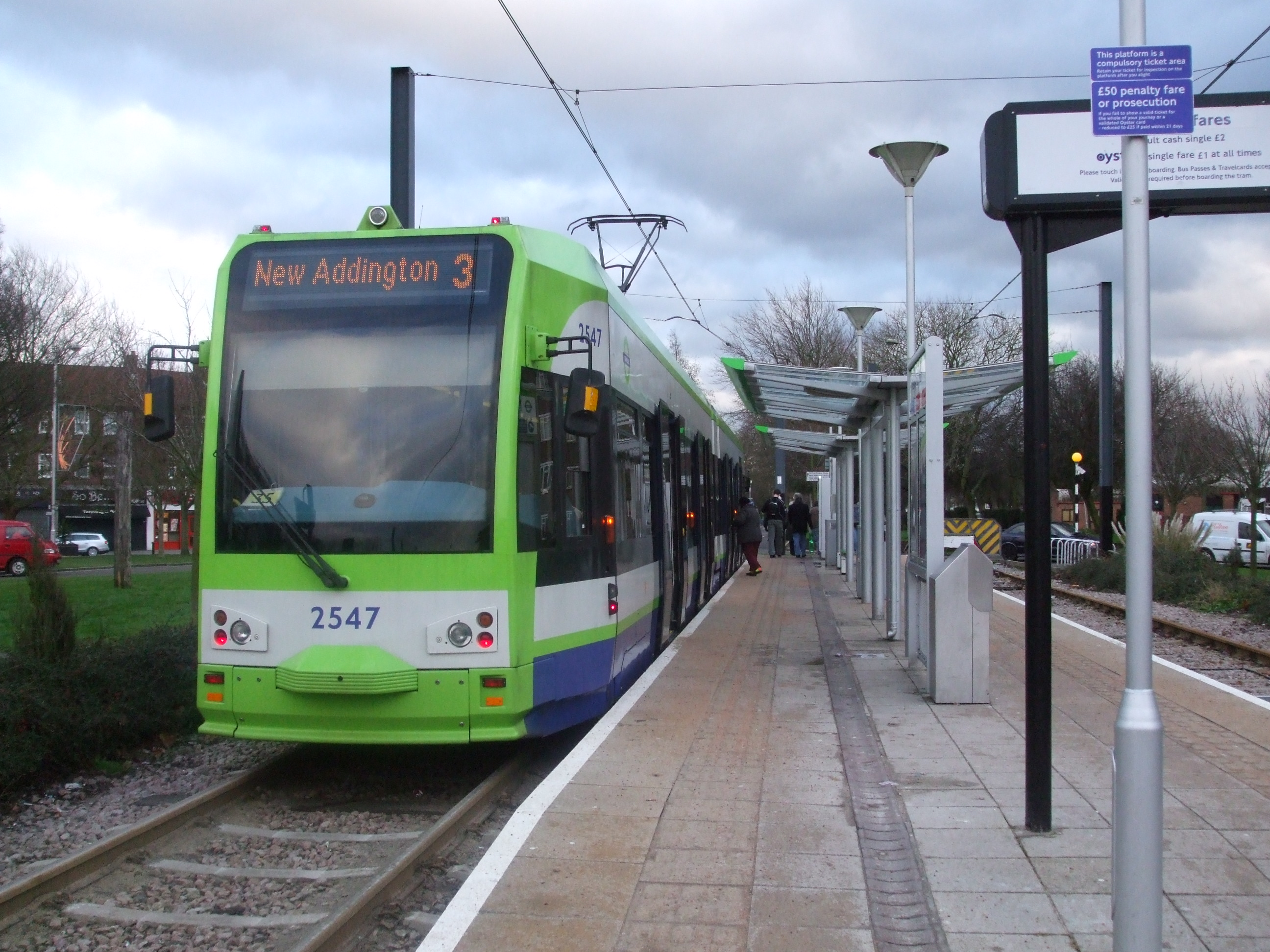
- Tram 2547 terminating at New Addington

General information
- Location: Parkway, New Addington, Croydon
- Coordinates: 51.342624°N 0.017469°W
- Operated by: Tramlink
- Platforms: 2

Construction
- Structure type: At-grade
- Accessible: Yes

Other information
- Status: Unstaffed
- Website: Official website

History
- Opened: 10 May 2000
Location
- Location in Croydon

New Addington is a terminal tram stop serving the centre of New Addington, located in the London Borough of Croydon. The tram stop is served by Tramlink, which connects New Addington with central Croydon.

== Services ==
New Addington is served by tram services operated by Tramlink. The tram stop is served by trams every 7-8 minutes to and from West Croydon via East Croydon and Centrale.

A very small number of early morning and late evening services continue beyond Croydon to and from Therapia Lane and Wimbledon. During the evenings on weekends, the service is reduced to a tram every 15 minutes.

Services are operated using Bombardier CR4000 and Stadler Variobahn Trams.

Preceding station	Tramlink	Following station
King Henry's Drive towards West Croydon	Tramlink; New Addington to Croydon town centre	Terminus

== Connections ==
The stop is served by London Buses routes 64, 130, 314 and 464 which provide connections to Addington Village, Croydon Town Centre, Thornton Heath, Biggin Hill, Tatsfield, Hayes, Bromley and Eltham.

Free interchange for journeys made within an hour is available between bus services and between buses and trams is available at New Addington as part of Transport for London's Hopper Fare.
