= Bombardier CR4000 =

Bombardier Flexity Swift Tram used in London

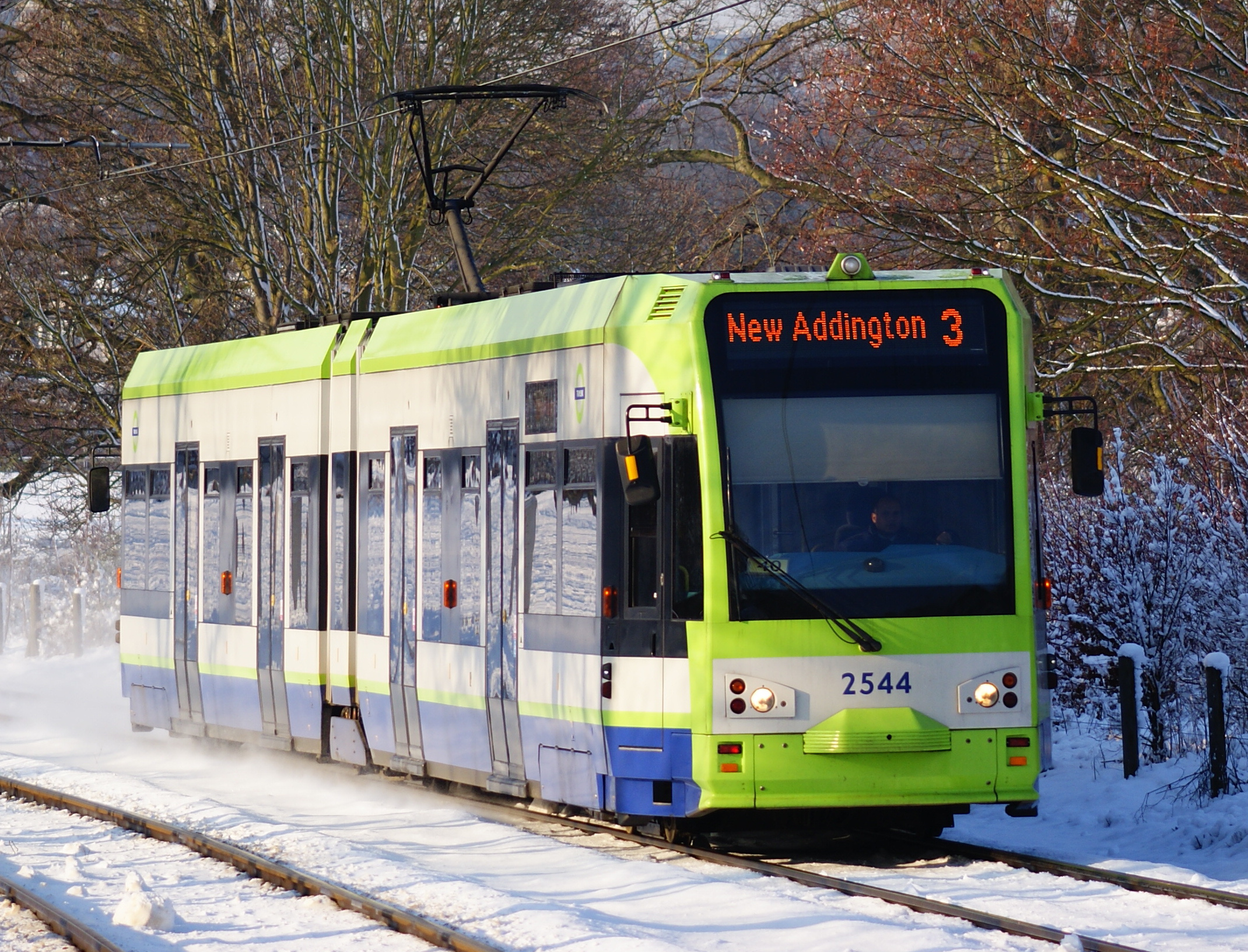
- CR4000 2544 in current livery in 2009

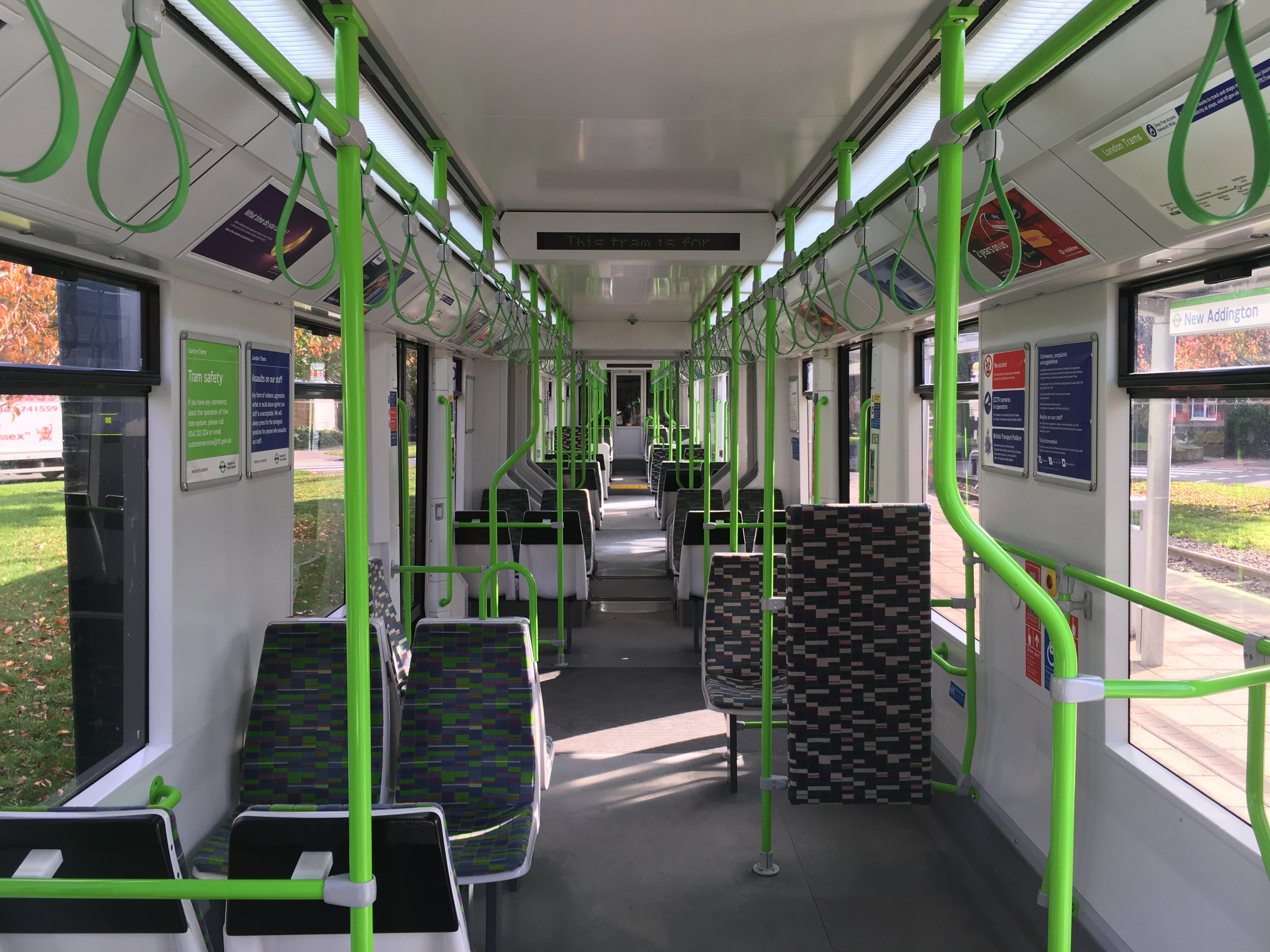
- The interior of a refurbished CR4000
- In service: 10 May 2000 – present
- Manufacturer: Bombardier Transportation
- Built at: Vienna, Austria
- Family name: Flexity Swift
- Constructed: 1998–2000
- Refurbished: 2008–2009, 2015
- Number built: 24
- Number in service: 23
- Fleet numbers: 2530–2553
- Capacity: 70 seated, 138 standing per tram
- Operator: Tramlink
- Depot: Therapia Lane

Specifications
- Car body construction: Aluminium
- Train length: 30.1 m (98 ft 9 in)
- Width: 2.65 m (8 ft 8 in)
- Height: 3.67 m (12 ft 0 in)
- Floor height: 350–400 mm (13.8–15.7 in)
- Platform height: 350 mm (13.8 in)
- Entry: 350 mm (13.8 in)
- Doors: 8 plug doors per set
- Articulated sections: 1
- Wheel diameter: 630–550 mm (25–22 in) (new–worn)
- Wheelbase: 1,800 mm (5 ft 11 in) (motorised); 1,900 mm (6 ft 3 in) (trailer)
- Maximum speed: 50 mph (80 km/h)
- Weight: 36.3 tonnes (35.7 long tons; 40.0 short tons) per tram
- Traction system: Kiepe Electric DPU 251 GTO–VVVF
- Traction motors: 4 × Alstom 4 LXA 1442 120 kW (161 hp) asynchronous 3-phase AC
- Power output: 480 kW (644 hp)
- Transmission: 7.225 : 1 gear ratio
- Acceleration: 1.2 m/s^{2} (2.7 mph/s)
- Deceleration: 1.3 m/s^{2} (2.9 mph/s) (service); 2.73 m/s^{2} (6.1 mph/s) (emergency)
- Electric systems: 750 V DC overhead catenary
- Current collection: Pantograph
- UIC classification: Bo′+2′+Bo′
- Track gauge: 4 ft 8 1/2 in (1,435 mm) standard gauge

The Bombardier CR4000 is a 76% low floor model of the Bombardier Flexity Swift trams operated by Tramlink in London. They are based on and very similar in appearance to the K4000 used on the low-platform routes of the Cologne Stadtbahn network. Built between 1998 and 2000, the trams entered service in the spring of 2000.

== History ==
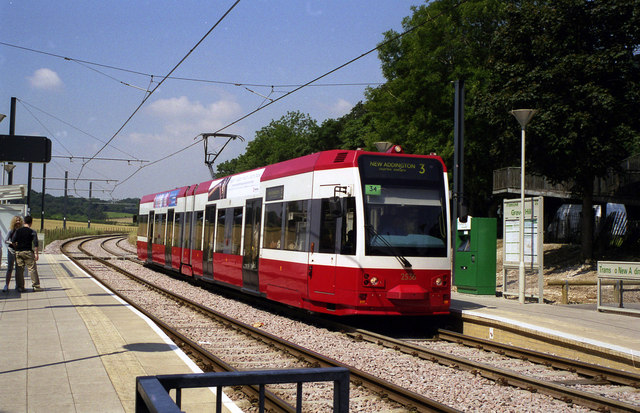
2530 in original livery at Gravel Hill in 2000

24 trams were ordered from Bombardier Transportation and built at its factory in Vienna, Austria between 1998 and 2000. The first tram, 2530, was delivered to Therapia Lane depot on 13 September 1998, with testing beginning soon afterwards. Although service was due to begin in November 1999, delays in the construction of the line meant that the first tram entered passenger service on 10 May 2000.

The trams are numbered 2530 through to 2553, following on from the highest numbered tram in the original London Transport numbering system, 2529, which was scrapped in 1952. All entered service in a red and white livery except for 2550, which was painted in FirstGroup livery.

== Overview ==
The trams are six-axle single-articulated double-ended cars, with four doors on each side. The low floor section stretches between both the outer doors through the articulation (which rests on an unpowered bogie). Between the outer door and each car end is a higher-floor section, accessed up a step and situated over the car's two power bogies. The low-floor section is 40 cm (16 in) above rail-level, sloping down to 35 cm (14 in) in the doorways, a height that matches the platforms at tram stops, and each car has two wheelchair positions.

The trams are 30.1 m (98 ft 9 in) long and 2.65 m (8 ft 8 in) wide, with 70 seats and a total capacity of just over 200 passengers. They operate from an overhead power supply at 750 V DC, and have a maximum speed of 80 km/h (50 mph).

Each tram has an integral traction braking controller with deadman's handle. While stationary, the tram is immobilized until the driver's hand is on the controller: if the driver's hand is removed from the controller while moving, an alarm sounds immediately and the driver's hand must return to the controller to disarm it. If a three-second countdown passes and it is not disarmed, the track brakes are applied.

== Upgrades and refurbishment ==
The trams have undergone a series of upgrades since their introduction. In 2006, the bus-like destination blinds (rollsigns) were replaced with LED destination blinds, and the on-board announcements were also updated, featuring the voice of BBC News presenter and tram-enthusiast Nicholas Owen.

All 24 trams were refurbished between 2008 and 2009, which involved a deep clean of the interior, installation of new seat moquette and a new lime green, blue and white external livery.

The trams underwent a second refurbishment from 2015–2016. This included a full interior repaint, including the repainting of all handrails, new flooring, new seat moquette, new safety signage and the removal of the stop request buttons. Externally, new LED headlights were fitted. 2553 was the first unit to be completed, having been out of service since 2014 following a serious road traffic accident. Following repairs and refurbishment, it re-entered service in May 2015.

== Naming ==
2535 was officially named Stephen Parascandolo 1980 - 2007 in a special ceremony at Beckenham Junction on 20 October 2007, in honour of Stephen Parascandolo, a well known local tram enthusiast and webmaster of the "Unofficial Croydon Tramlink website" who died at the age of 26 in a road traffic incident in Hitchin. The ceremony was attended by his parents, fellow enthusiasts and officials from Tramlink.

== Accidents and incidents ==
On 9 November 2016, unit 2551 derailed and overturned on a sharp curve approaching Sandilands Junction, just east of Sandilands tram stop. There were seven fatalities, with 58 other people injured, sixteen of them sustaining serious injuries. Although the speed limit approaching the junction was 20 kilometres per hour (12 mph), the tram had been travelling at an estimated speed of 73 kilometres per hour (45 mph).

The Rail Accident Investigation Branch (RAIB) is investigating the type of glass windows installed in the CR4000 vehicles. During the derailment, the right hand side of the tram was substantially damaged, breaking or dislodging several bodyside and door windows, and causing multiple people to be ejected or partially ejected from the tram. Of the seven fatalities, six were ejected through the windows. The Office of Rail Regulation (ORR) refused to comment on whether the derailed tram was fitted with laminated safety glass, claiming that it was unable to do so because of the RAIB's investigation. Bombardier did not respond to requests for information on the type of glass that could have been the cause of fatalities in this derailment.

Following the accident, vehicle 2551 was significantly damaged and has since been permanently withdrawn. In March 2022, the vehicle was returned to TfL from the RAIB. As of June 2025, the vehicle remains in TfL's possession but remains out of service. The vehicle's future remains unknown as of then.
