= Reeves Corner tram stop =

Tramlink tram stop in London, England

Reeves Corner
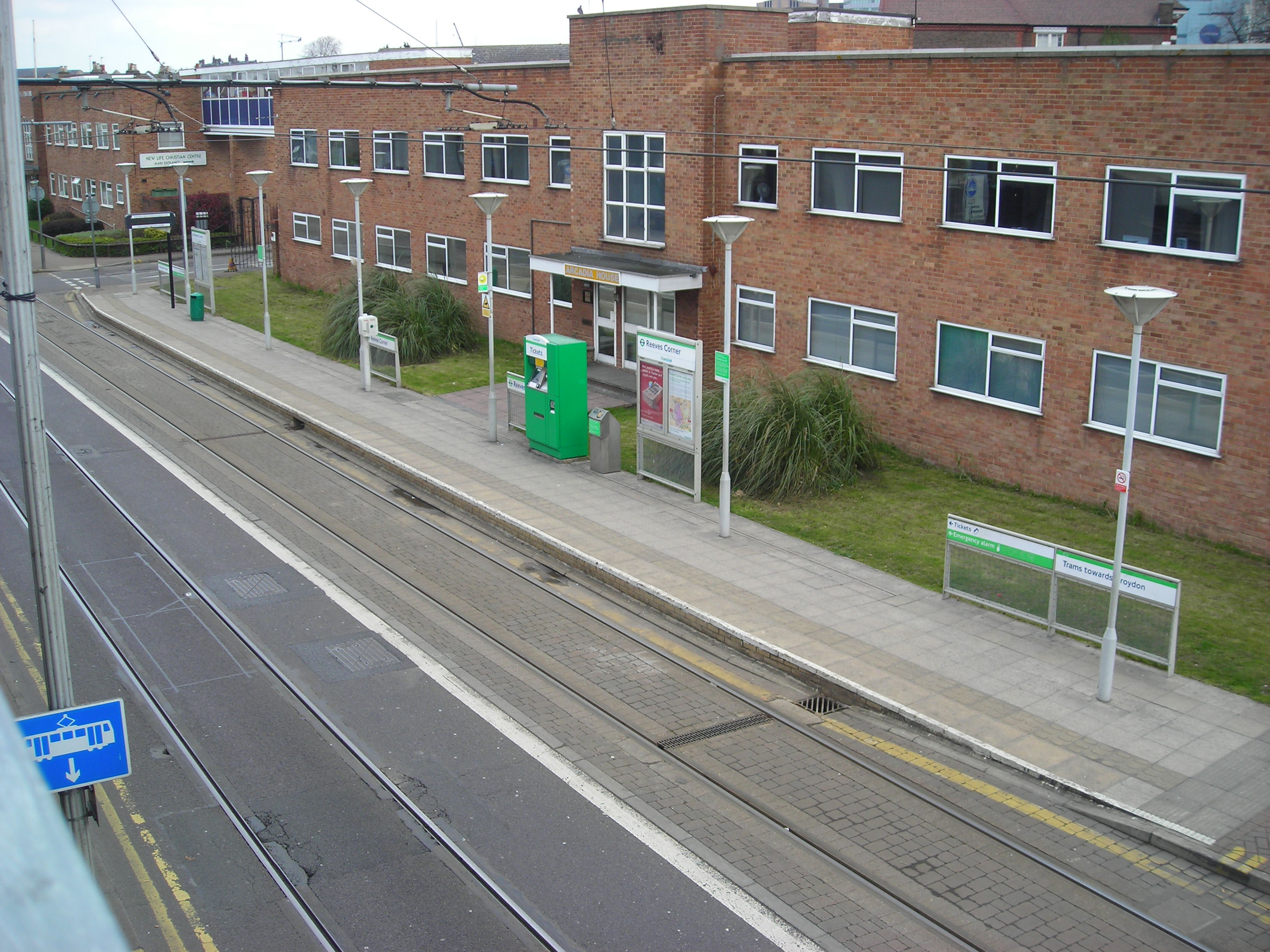
- Viewed from adjacent flyover

General information
- Location: Cairo New Road, Croydon
- Coordinates: 51.3748°N 0.1063°W
- Operated by: Tramlink
- Platforms: 1

Construction
- Structure type: At-grade
- Accessible: Yes

Other information
- Status: Unstaffed
- Website: Official website

History
- Opened: 30 May 2000
Location
- Location in Croydon

Reeves Corner tram stop is a stop on the Tramlink service in central Croydon.

== History ==
Reeves Corner tram stop was added at a late stage of planning for Tramlink, to give passengers from Wimbledon better access to the southern part of Croydon town centre. Ownership was transferred to Transport for London on 27 June 2008. Tramlink service was disrupted during the 2011 England riots when part of the Reeves Corner buildings were destroyed by an arson attack.

== Design ==
Reeves Corner is an on-street stop with a single platform on the pavement. It is raised 315 mm (12.4 in) above rail level to permit level boarding, has a passenger information display, a help point, lighting and CCTV camera. For accessibility, there are ramps at either end of the platform and tactile and contrasting paving strips. It is one of only two stops that was not provided with shelters or seating. (Note: The other stop without shelters or seating is George Street.) Trams are carried on slab track integrated into the roadway.

== Location ==
The stop is located next to Reeves Corner. The junction takes its name from the House of Reeves furniture store that opened in 1867 and is a local landmark. Church Street tram stop is provided nearby for westbound service towards Wimbledon.

London Buses routes 157, 264, 407 and 410 serve bus stops near the tram stop. Free interchange for journeys made within an hour is available between trams and buses as part of Transport for London's Hopper fare.

== Services ==
The typical off-peak service in trams per hour from Reeves Corner is:

- 6 tph eastbound only between Wimbledon and Beckenham Junction
- 6 tph eastbound only between Wimbledon and Elmers End

Services are operated using Bombardier CR4000 and Stadler Variobahn model low-floor trams.

The stop is one of the least used on the network, ranking 33rd in 2025 by number of tap-ins.

Preceding station	Tramlink	Following station
Wandle Park One-way operation	Tramlink; Wimbledon to Beckenham Junction	Centrale towards Beckenham Junction
Wandle Park One-way operation	Tramlink; Wimbledon to Elmers End	Centrale towards Elmers End
