= Sutton Link =

Proposed tram line

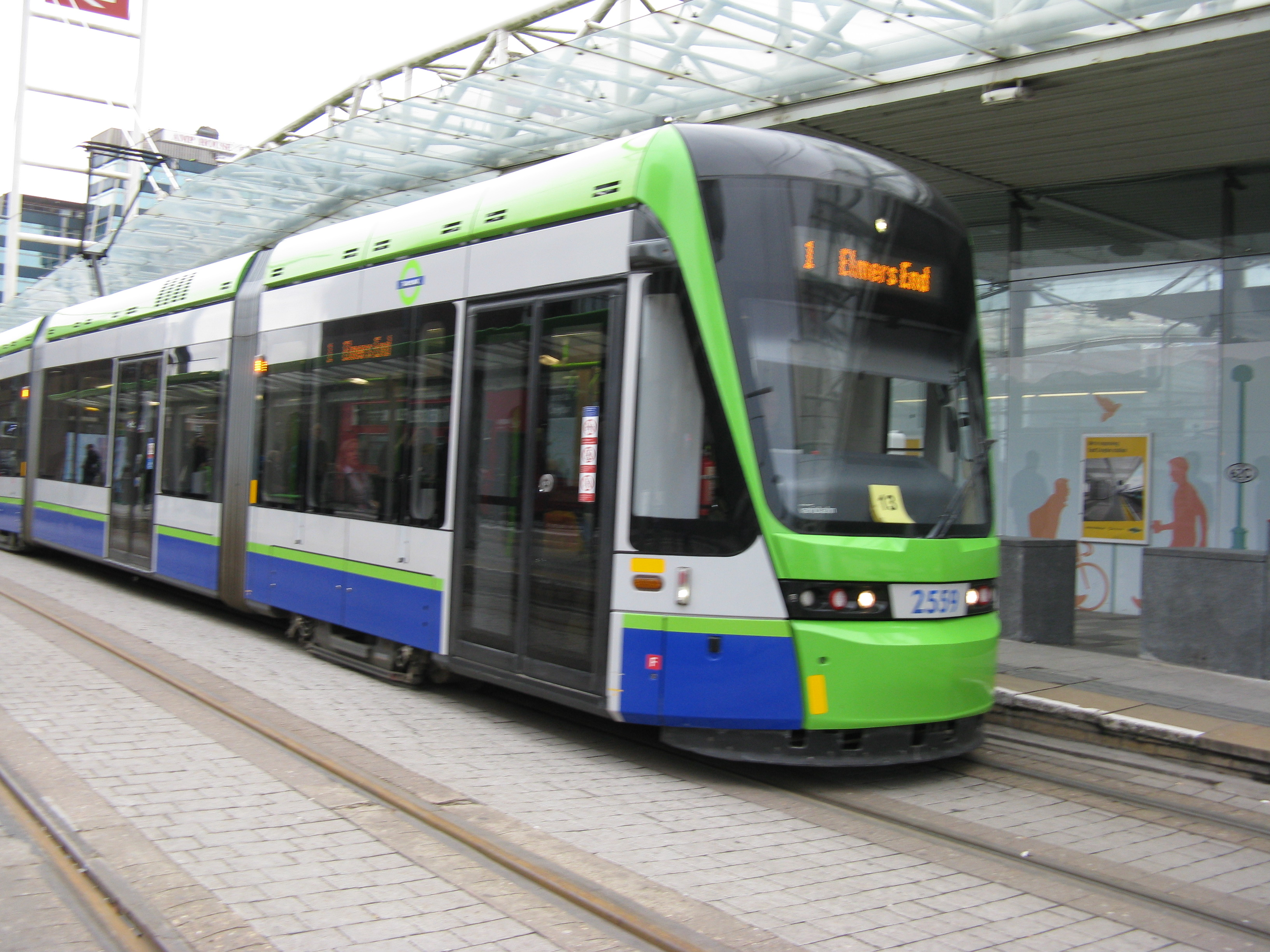
London tram in Croydon

The Sutton Link is a proposed new tram line in South London, between Colliers Wood via St Helier to Sutton. Proposed since the early 2000s, consultations on the proposed route took place in the late 2010s. A preferred route was announced in February 2020. Financial issues caused by the COVID-19 pandemic led Transport for London to put the project on hold in July 2020. Despite being identified in the London Plan, the project was cancelled in 2023, due to a "weak business case" and lack of funding.

== History ==
=== Initial proposals ===
Since the opening of Croydon Tramlink (now London Trams) in 2000, there have been several proposals to extend the network to other parts of south and south-east London, including to Sutton and Crystal Palace. In 2002, TfL indicated that an Tramlink extension to Sutton was being considered. In 2005, the Spending Review only allocated funding towards an Tramlink extension to Crystal Palace, and work on the Sutton extension was placed on hold.

In the early 2010s, TfL again began feasibility work on extending the Tramlink south towards Sutton. In September 2011, the London Borough of Sutton and London Borough of Merton signed a joint Statement of Intent, expressing their support for a future extension to Sutton. In May 2013, the London Borough of Sutton published an prospectus outlining the potential benefits of an extension to Tramlink to connect to Sutton and the Royal Marsden Hospital. This outlined a potential route from the Morden Road tram stop, heading south along the A24 and A297 to Rosehill Roundabout, then through Sutton town centre, ending at Sutton railway station. A further extension south would connect to the Royal Marsden Hospital. Discussions with Transport for London (TfL) indicated that the initial phase to Sutton could cost around £240m. The prospectus indicated support from both Sutton and Merton Councils, as well as from major employers along the route.

In July 2013, the Mayor of London Boris Johnson said that there was a reasonable business case for an extension of tram to Sutton. In the London 2050 Infrastructure plan, an extension of the tram to Sutton was given a medium priority with a timescale of 2030.

=== Sutton and Merton consult on extension ===
Between July and August 2014, a joint consultation by the London Boroughs of Merton and Sutton was held. It aimed to gauge support for the extension, as well as for different routes proposed. The consultation offered three choices of northern terminus (Wimbledon and South Wimbledon on-street or off-street), with or without the loop serving St Helier Hospital directly, and for the Sutton loop to either run entirely around the Sutton gyratory or divert north along the High Street. In September 2014, results showed 84% of respondents strongly supported or supported the extension. Respondents also supported a northern terminus at Wimbledon, a loop to serve St Helier Hospital, and running entirely around the Sutton gyratory.

In March 2016, £100m from TfL was initially secured in their draft 2016/17 budget, however this was subsequently reallocated. Merton and Sutton Councils promised £50m each towards the line. In May 2016, the Mayor of London, Sadiq Khan, said he remained committed to the project, and called on Sutton Council to raise the shortfall in funding. Khan also noted that a project like a tram extension take a long time to deliver. In October 2017, it was announced that TfL would put £70m towards the extension, funded from a London wide growth fund.

=== Further consultation ===
In October 2018, TfL began a further consultation on the Sutton Link, with three potential route options to reach Sutton town centre.

Option	Northern terminus	Route	Mode of transport
1	South Wimbledon tube station	From South Wimbledon tube station along Morden Road (A24), interchange with Morden Road tram stop, through Morden (300m from Morden tube station, through Rose Hill and St Helier, follows Sutton gyratory	Tram or Bus rapid transit (BRT)
2	Colliers Wood tube station	From Colliers Wood tube station along Church Road, interchange with Belgrave Walk tram stop, along Morden Road (A239), through Rose Hill and St Helier, follows Sutton gyratory	Tram or BRT
3	Wimbledon	Along Sutton Loop Line from Wimbledon, diverts from line at Collingwood Road before West Sutton, follows Sutton gyratory	Tram

The consultation indicated that options 1 or 2 would cost £425m as a segregated tram line, but also could be delivered at £275m as a bus rapid transit (BRT) route. Options 1 and 2 also had potential for a direct link at Wimbledon station (with option 2 the easier route) and a potential loop for a direct connection with St Helier Hospital. Option 3 however was only proposed as a tram route, at £300m, with Thameslink services terminating at West Sutton and Wimbledon. Services on the intermediate stations would however be more frequent as a tram service than currently. Work could begin in 2022, with aim for completing in 2025. Services to Wimbledon regardless of route would however be postponed several years to co-ordinate with Crossrail 2 works, due to the low capacity on tram platforms in the station and to limit disruption.

=== Support from TfL ===
In 2018, the project was included in the Mayor's Transport Strategy. It outlined how a potential tram extension would improve connectivity in south London, enabling the delivery of new homes in Sutton town centre and provide improved connections to employment. In January 2019, Sadiq Khan reaffirmed TfL's support for the scheme, noting that £70m was being spent on developing the project. He expressed concern that there was a funding gap of about £255 million, as TfL was providing 70% of the funding, while Sutton and Merton were contributing 22% and 8% respectively.

In April 2019, TfL released the results of the 2018 consultation – which showed strong support for the extension overall. 81% of respondents supported a tram option, with respondents preferring option 1 (65% support or strong support) over option 2 (55% support or strong support) and option 3 (49% support or strong support).

In February 2020, TfL announced the preferred route of the extension, expressing their support for "Route Option 2 (Colliers Wood – Sutton) operated as a tram service ... assuming we are successful in securing funding to deliver the project". The report acknowledged that the BRT option would be cheaper, however the tram was preferred due to the greater transport benefits and greater public support. The report indicated that next steps for the Sutton Link included finalising funding for the project, undertaking detailed design work and acquiring authorisation (a Transport and Works Act Order) to construct, operate and maintain the extension.

It was estimated that the extension would cost around £560 million, with TfL contributing £79 million and Sutton and Merton Council contributing around £36 million – leaving a funding gap of around £440 million.

=== Project put on hold ===
Following the loss of passenger income due to the COVID-19 pandemic, TfL announced in July 2020 that the project had been put on hold, as "the transport case is poor and there remains a significant funding gap". Andy Byford, London’s Transport Commissioner, said that the COVID-19 pandemic has resulted in making "difficult choices" about funding of projects. Sutton councillor Manuel Abellan called the announcement "a kick in the teeth for our residents", calling for Prime Minister Boris Johnson to fund the extension.

The project was identified in the 2021 London Plan as a key transport scheme, with an indicated medium cost level, and construction within the decade spanning from 2020 to 2030.

In April 2023, MP for Sutton and Cheam and Minister for London Paul Scully criticised Mayor of London Sadiq Khan for failing to build the extension, stating that "we need more public transport alternatives" before the Ultra Low Emission Zone is extended to Sutton. Scully also noted that "Sutton has one of the lowest levels per head of transport investment by the Mayor of any London borough". A spokesperson for the Mayor responded by requesting financial support from government towards the tram extension, noting the £440 million funding gap.

In September 2023, TfL announced that it could no longer commit any funding to the scheme, in light of a "weak" business case. In November 2023, Mayor Khan expressed willingness to reconsider the tram if funding became available in future. Of the major political parties who took part in the 2024 London mayoral election, only the Green Party manifesto mentioned the Sutton Link. Sutton Council continue to advocate for the tram, with the leader of the Council inviting Mayor Khan to visit the borough.

In September 2024, Luke Taylor, the newly elected MP for Sutton and Cheam pledged to advocate for the project. He highlighted the council's ongoing efforts and the support from Liberal Democrats in the London Assembly such as Caroline Pidgeon, who have been urging TfL to reinstate funding for the extension.
