= Ampere Way tram stop =

Tramlink tram stop in London, England

Ampere Way
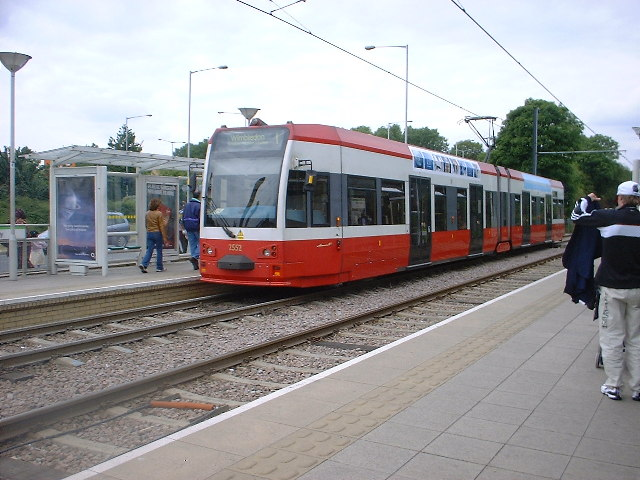
- Tram at the stop

General information
- Location: Purley Way, Croydon
- Coordinates: 51.3824°N 0.1238°W
- Operated by: Tramlink
- Platforms: 2

Construction
- Structure type: At-grade
- Accessible: Yes

Other information
- Status: Unstaffed
- Website: Official website

History
- Opened: 30 May 2000
Location
- Location in Croydon

Ampere Way is a tram stop in the London Borough of Croydon, serving the Purley Way commercial area. Tramlink trams serve the stop, which is located opposite IKEA Croydon. The tram stop is served by tram services between Elmers End/Beckenham Junction and Wimbledon.

== History ==
When the stop opened, it was named "Ampere Way" in reference to the nearby former Croydon Power Station. The two chimneys from the old power station still exist in the grounds of the IKEA store.

The station was renamed IKEA Ampere Way under a sponsorship deal on 18 October 2006, in order to promote the stop's location near IKEA's Croydon store. By March 2008, the station had reverted to its former name.

== Location ==
It is located in the Purley Way commercial area. London Buses route S4 serves the tram stop. Free interchange for journeys made within an hour is available between trams and buses as part of Transport for London's Hopper Fare.

== Services ==
The typical off-peak service in trams per hour from Ampere Way is:

- 6 tph in each direction between Beckenham Junction and Wimbledon
- 6 tph in each direction between Elmers End and Wimbledon

Services are operated using Bombardier CR4000 and Stadler Variobahn model low-floor trams.

Preceding station	Tramlink	Following station
Therapia Lane towards Wimbledon	Tramlink; Wimbledon to Beckenham Junction	Waddon Marsh towards Beckenham Junction
Therapia Lane towards Wimbledon	Tramlink; Wimbledon to Elmers End	Waddon Marsh towards Elmers End
