= Dundonald Road tram stop =

Tramlink tram stop in London, England

Dundonald Road
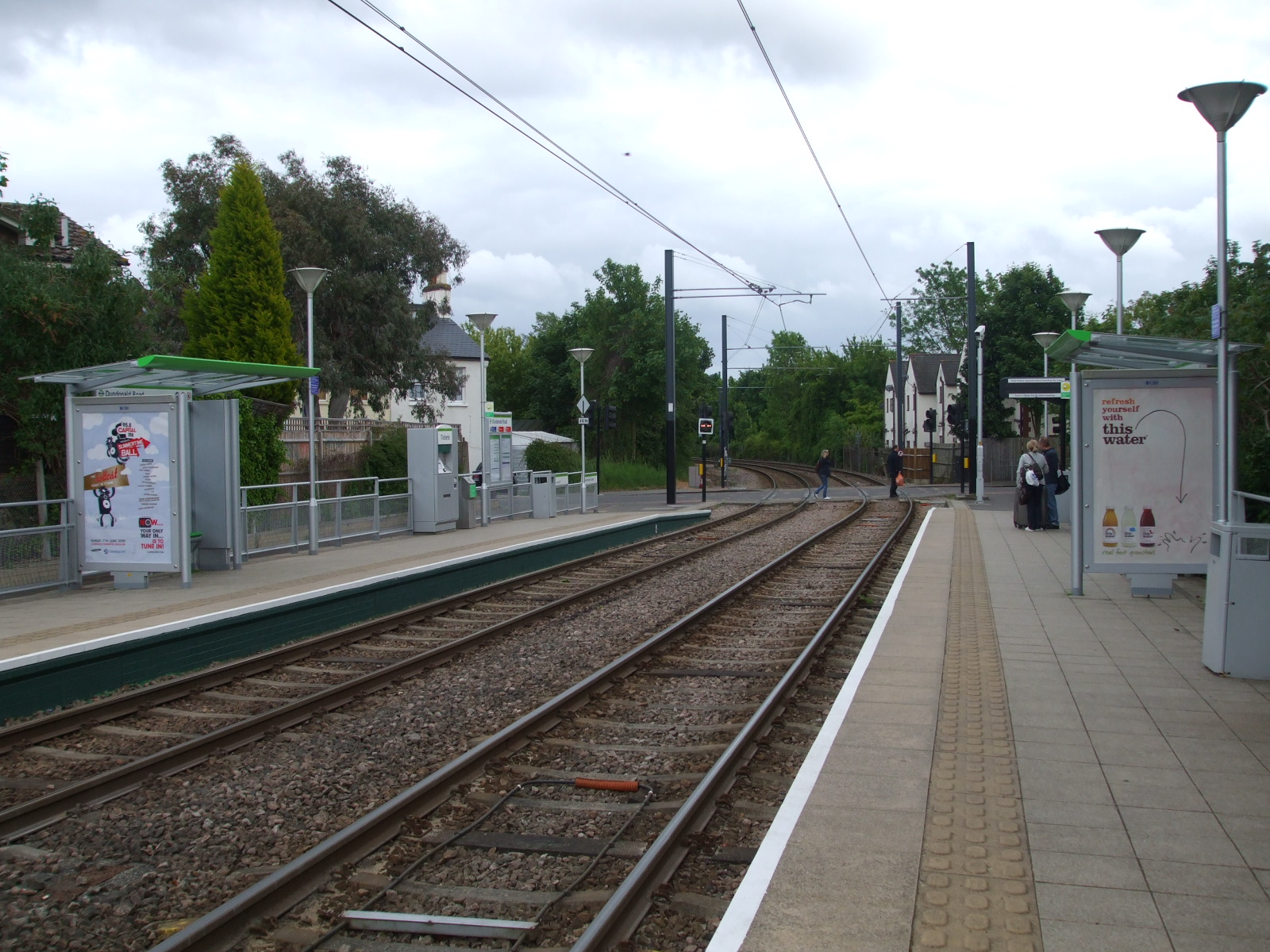
- Looking east

General information
- Location: Dundonald Road, Wimbledon, Merton
- Coordinates: 51.4176°N 0.2077°W
- Operated by: Tramlink
- Platforms: 2

Construction
- Structure type: At-grade
- Accessible: Yes

Other information
- Status: Unstaffed
- Website: Official website

History
- Opened: 30 May 2000
Location
- Location in Merton

Dundonald Road tram stop is a stop on the Tramlink service to the south of Wimbledon town centre, in the London Borough of Merton.

== History ==
The Wimbledon–West Croydon line passed through the area, but without a station at Dundonald Road. Service was withdrawn in May 1997. Tramlink reused the Wimbledon–West Croydon alignment and a new station was built. The level crossing with lifting barriers on Dundonald Road was replaced with traffic lights. Ownership was transferred to Transport for London on 27 June 2008.

The stop was one of the 15 request stops on Tramlink until 15 December 2019, when it became a stop for all trams.

== Design ==
The stop is off-street on a section of double track with two side platforms. The platforms are raised 315 mm (12.4 in) above rail level to permit level boarding. They have passenger information displays, help points, lighting, seating, shelters and CCTV cameras. For accessibility, there are ramps at either end of the platforms and tactile and contrasting paving strips. The stop is provided with cycle parking.

== Location ==
Access is direct from the pavement on the north side of Dundonald Road at the site of the old level crossing (where the old, now demolished, signal box used to stand on the south side). The tram stop is near Dundonald Park and the Dundonald Primary School.

== Services ==
The typical off-peak service in trams per hour from Dundonald Road is:

- 6 tph in each direction between Beckenham Junction and Wimbledon
- 6 tph in each direction between Elmers End and Wimbledon

Services are operated using Bombardier CR4000 and Stadler Variobahn model low-floor trams.

Preceding station	Tramlink	Following station
Wimbledon Terminus	Tramlink; Wimbledon to Beckenham Junction	Merton Park towards Beckenham Junction
Wimbledon Terminus	Tramlink; Wimbledon to Elmers End	Merton Park towards Elmers End
