= Centrale tram stop =

Tramlink tram stop in London, England

Centrale
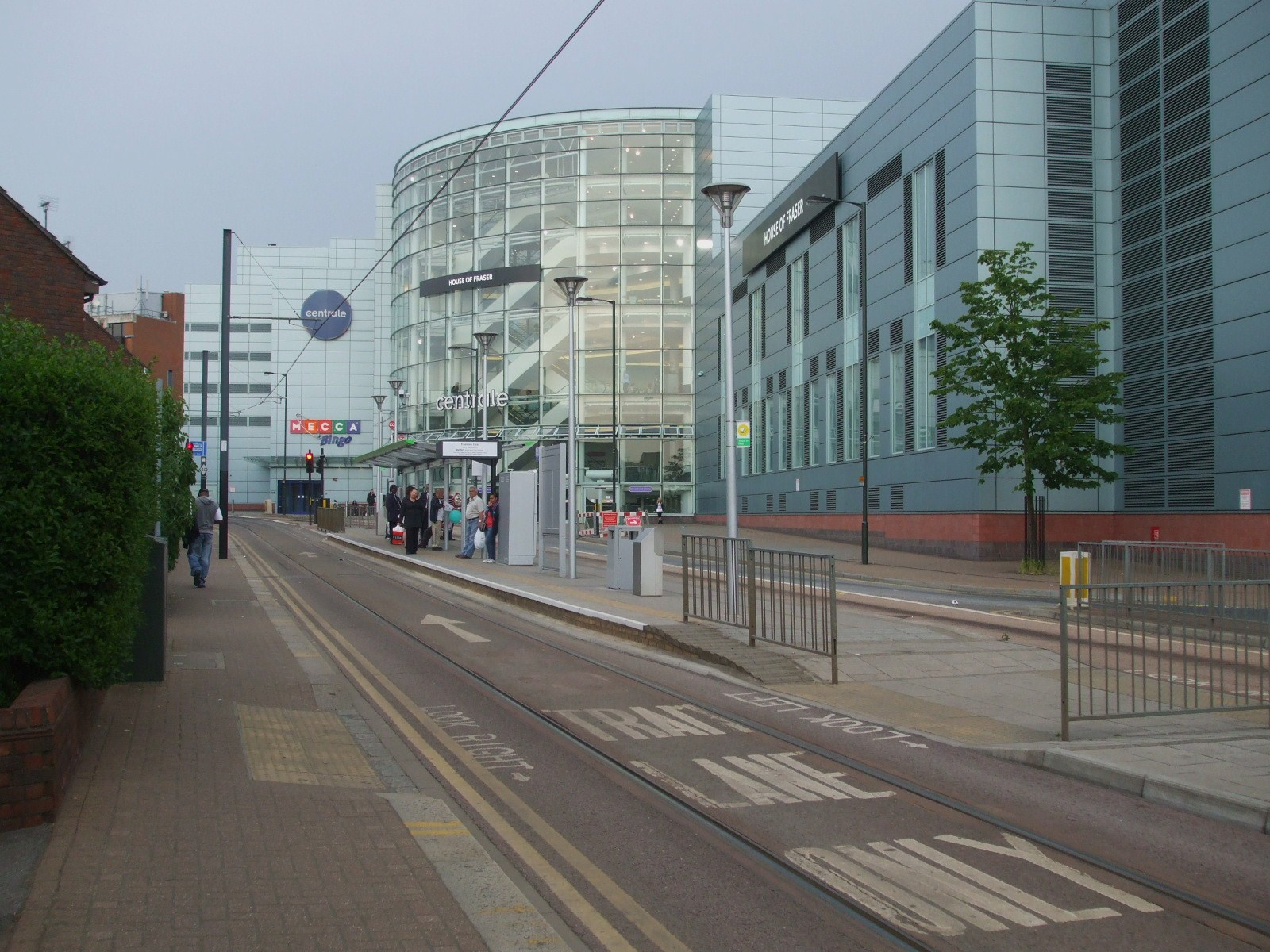
- Stop with Centrale shopping centre in the background

General information
- Location: Tamworth Road, Croydon
- Coordinates: 51.3758°N 0.1039°W
- Operated by: Tramlink
- Platforms: 1

Construction
- Structure type: At-grade
- Accessible: Yes

Other information
- Status: Unstaffed
- Website: Official website

History
- Opened: 10 December 2005; 20 years ago
Location
- Location in Croydon

Centrale tram stop is a stop on the Tramlink service in Croydon town centre, serving the Centrale shopping centre. The tram stop was provided and paid for as part of the development of the shopping centre.

The stop operates as a transport interchange with trams stopping on one side of the platform and local buses on the other. Centrale, West Croydon and East Croydon, operate as Tramlink interchanges within the 'Croydon Loop'.

== History ==
A stop on Tamworth Road was part of the original design for the system. It was expected to enter service on 2 April 2004, when the new Centrale shopping centre opened. Developers St Martin's Property Corporation made provision for the tram stop in their plans and contributed to the costs of fitting out the tram stop through planning obligations. Opening was delayed by eighteen months due to protracted negotiations between Transport for London and Tramtrack Croydon Ltd, the operators of the tram system. The Centrale tram stop opened on 10 December 2005. Ownership was transferred to Transport for London on 27 June 2008.

== Design ==
Centrale is an island platform served by trams on one side and buses on the other, allowing cross-platform interchange. It had been hoped to incorporate this design at more tram stops when the system originally opened.

== Location ==
The tram stop is located on Tamworth Road, next to the main entrance of the Centrale shopping centre.

London Buses routes 157, 264, 407 and 410 serve the tram stop.

== Services ==
The typical off-peak service in trams per hour from Centrale is:

- 6 tph eastbound only between Wimbledon and Beckenham Junction
- 6 tph eastbound only between Wimbledon and Elmers End
- 8 tph eastbound only to West Croydon, continuing to New Addington

Services are operated using Bombardier CR4000 and Stadler Variobahn model low-floor trams.

Preceding station	Tramlink	Following station
Reeves Corner One-way operation	Tramlink; Wimbledon to Beckenham Junction	West Croydon towards Beckenham Junction
Reeves Corner One-way operation	Tramlink; Wimbledon to Elmers End	West Croydon towards Elmers End
Church Street One-way operation	Tramlink; New Addington to Croydon town centre	West Croydon towards New Addington
