= Merton Park tram stop =

Tramlink tram stop in London, England

Merton Park
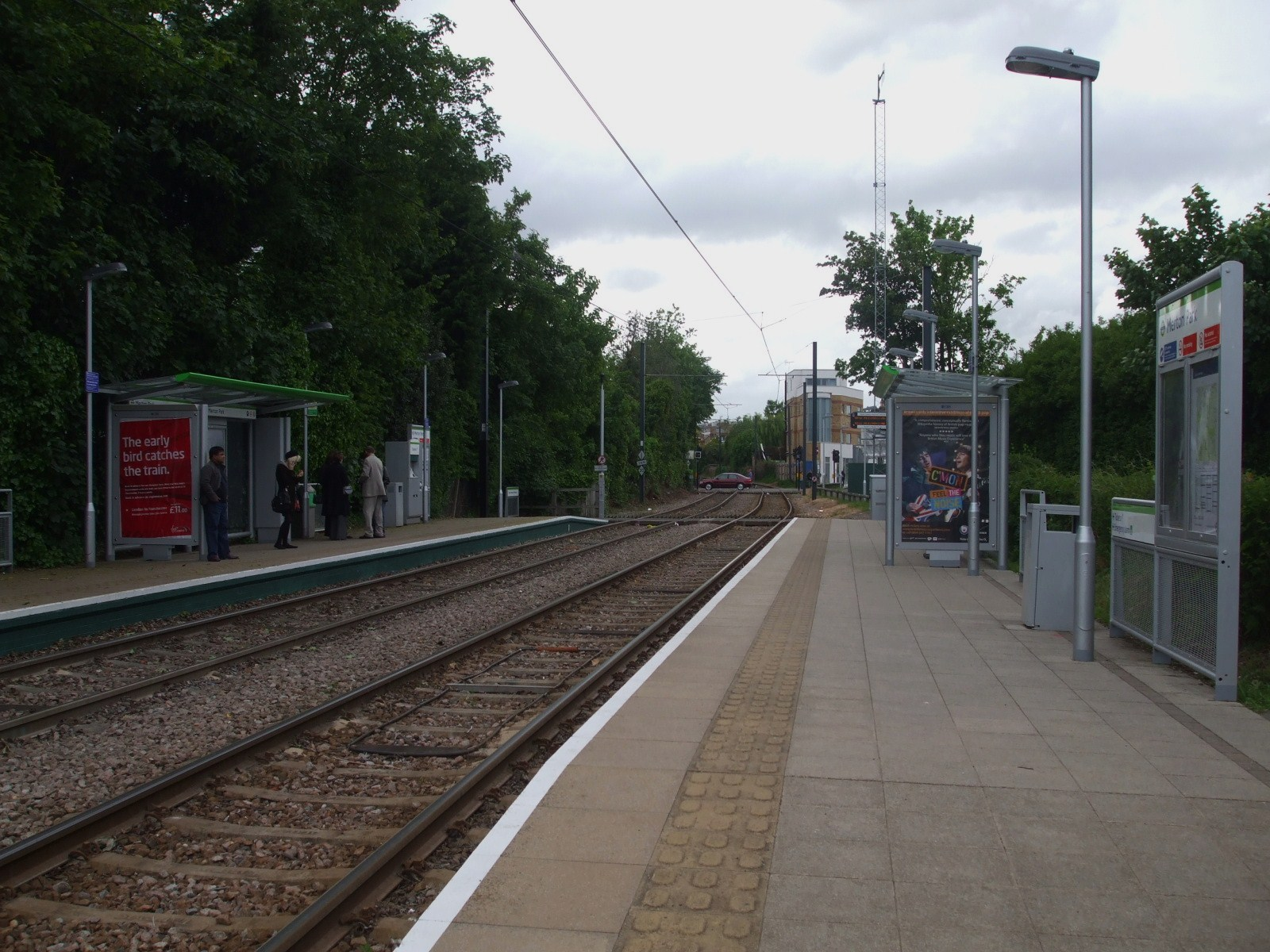
- Looking west

General information
- Location: Merton Park, Merton
- Coordinates: 51°24′49″N 0°12′4″W
- Operated by: Tramlink
- Platforms: 2

Construction
- Structure type: At-grade
- Accessible: Yes

Other information
- Status: Unstaffed
- Website: Official website

History
- Opened: 30 May 2000
Location
- Location in Merton

Merton Park tram stop is a stop on the Tramlink service in the London Borough of Merton.

== History ==
It overlaps part of the site of the former Merton Park railway station which was served by passenger trains on the West Croydon to Wimbledon Line until 1997, and by trains via Tooting Junction on the Merton Abbey Branch until 1929. The station building of the original station (about 200 yards south) has been converted to a private house.

== Design ==
The stop is off-street on a section of double track with two side platforms. The platforms are raised 315 mm (12.4 in) above rail level to permit level boarding. They have passenger information displays, help points, lighting, seating, shelters and CCTV cameras. For accessibility, there are ramps at either end of the platforms and tactile and contrasting paving strips. The stop is provided with cycle parking.

== Location ==
Access is provided by footpath from Kingston Road at the site of the old level crossing and signal box. A footpath also comes from the nearby nature preserve at Nursery Road playing fields and another level crossing from a footpath from Dorset Road (B285). London Buses routes 152, 163, and 164 serve bus stops near the tram stop. Free interchange for journeys made within an hour is available between trams and buses as part of Transport for London's Hopper fare.

== Services ==
The typical off-peak service in trams per hour from Merton Park is:

- 6 tph in each direction between Beckenham Junction and Wimbledon
- 6 tph in each direction between Elmers End and Wimbledon

Services are operated using Bombardier CR4000 and Stadler Variobahn model low-floor trams.

Preceding station	Tramlink	Following station
Dundonald Road towards Wimbledon	Tramlink; Wimbledon to Beckenham Junction	Morden Road towards Beckenham Junction
Dundonald Road towards Wimbledon	Tramlink; Wimbledon to Elmers End	Morden Road towards Elmers End
