= Phipps Bridge tram stop =

Tramlink tram stop in London, England

Phipps Bridge
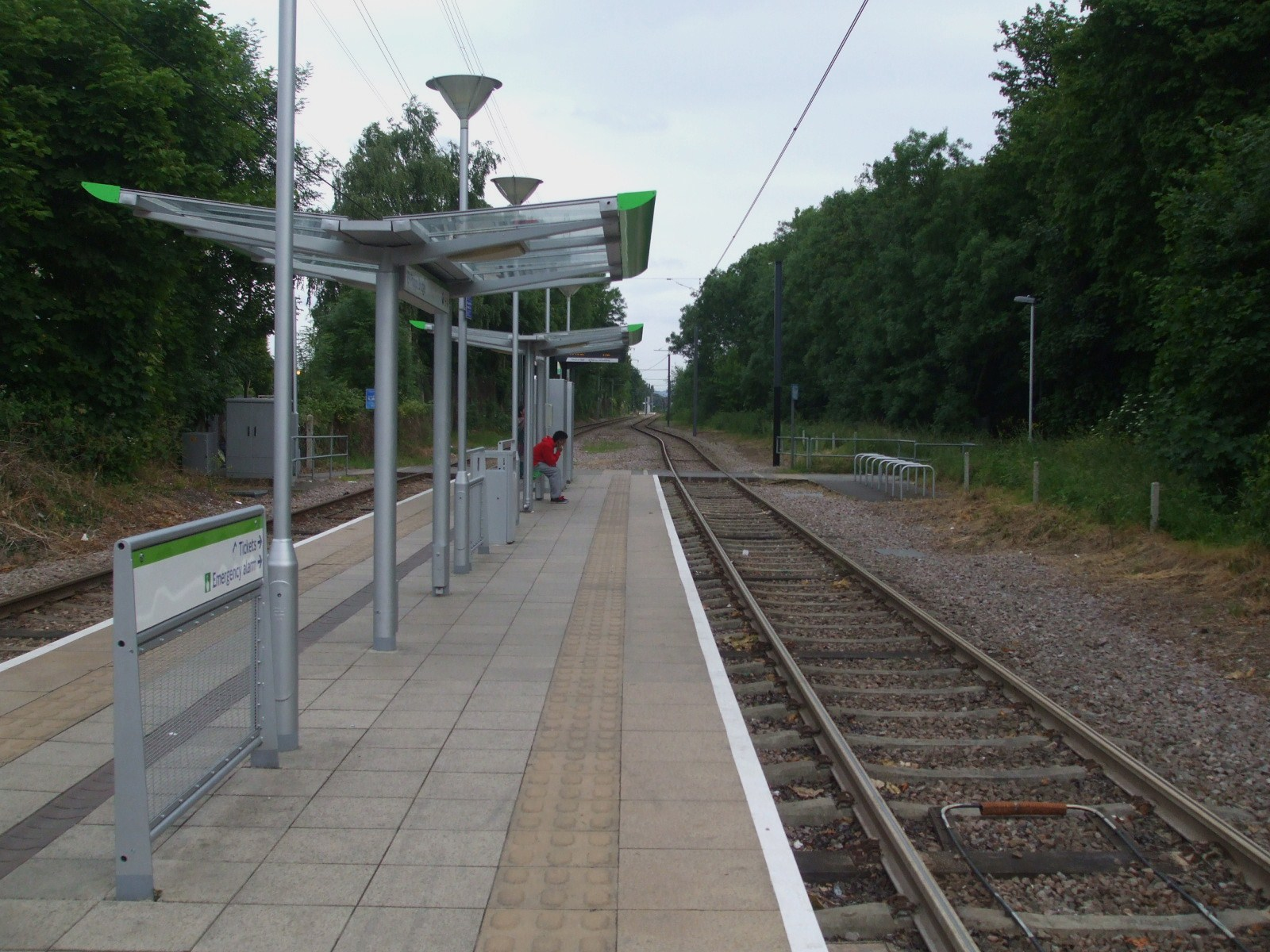
- Looking east

General information
- Location: Mitcham, Merton
- Coordinates: 51.403583°N 0.182626°W
- Operated by: Tramlink
- Platforms: 2

Construction
- Structure type: At-grade
- Accessible: Yes

Other information
- Status: Unstaffed
- Website: Official website

History
- Opened: 30 May 2000
Location
- Location in Merton

Phipps Bridge tram stop is a stop on the Tramlink service in the London Borough of Merton. The stop is named after Phipps Bridge Road, an adjacent residential street.

The tram stop consists of a single island platform. Immediately to the west of the station is a single-track section which reaches as far as Morden Road tram stop. To the east, double track continues to the nearby Belgrave Walk tram stop, which is clearly visible from Phipps Bridge tram stop.

Access to the platform is via pedestrian level crossings over the tracks. To the north a footpath gives access to Phipps Bridge Road. To the south, a gateway gives pedestrian access to the National Trust's Morden Hall Park, which borders the line to the south for a considerable distance each side of the stop.

== Services ==
The typical off-peak service in trams per hour from Phipps Bridge is:

- 6 tph in each direction between Beckenham Junction and Wimbledon
- 6 tph in each direction between Elmers End and Wimbledon

Services are operated using Bombardier CR4000 and Stadler Variobahn model low-floor trams.

| Preceding station | Tramlink | Following station |
|---|---|---|
| Morden Road towards Wimbledon | Tramlink; Wimbledon to Beckenham Junction | Belgrave Walk towards Beckenham Junction |
| Morden Road towards Wimbledon | Tramlink; Wimbledon to Elmers End | Belgrave Walk towards Elmers End |

== Connections ==
London Buses route 200 serves the tram stop.

Free interchange for journeys made within an hour is available between trams and buses as part of Transport for London's Hopper Fare.
