= Morden Road tram stop =

Tramlink tram stop in London, England

Morden Road
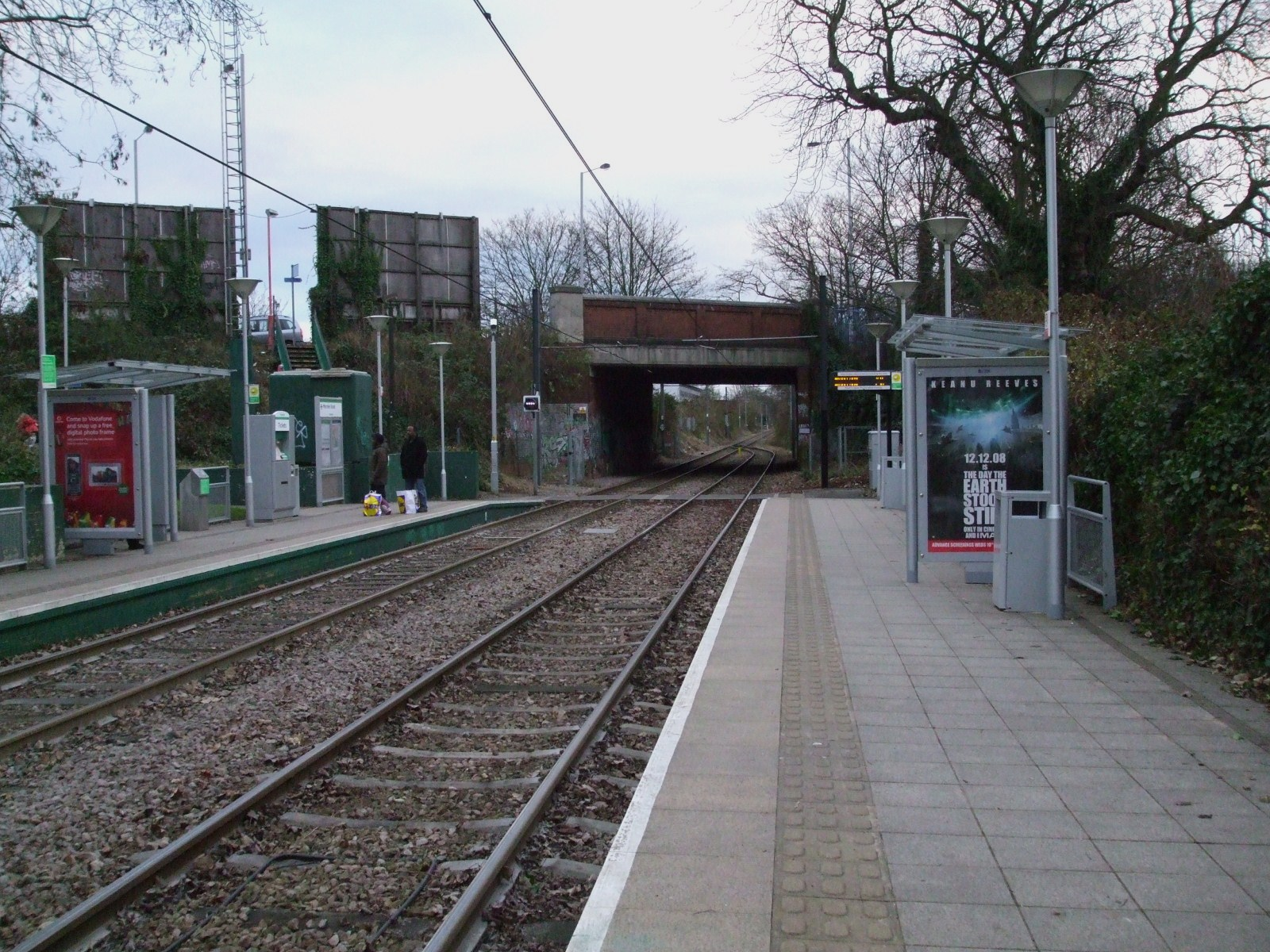
- Looking east

General information
- Location: Merton Park, Merton
- Coordinates: 51.408843°N 0.192904°W
- Operated by: Tramlink
- Platforms: 2

Construction
- Structure type: At-grade
- Accessible: Yes

Other information
- Status: Unstaffed
- Website: Official website

History
- Opened: 30 May 2000
Location
- Location in Merton

Morden Road is a Tramlink stop in the London Borough of Merton. It is on the site of the former Morden Road railway station on the Wimbledon-West Croydon line, which closed to rail traffic in 1997. The tram stop consists of two platforms on either side of the double track, linked by pedestrian level crossings. Immediately to the east of the station is a single-track section which reaches as far as Phipps Bridge tram stop.

The eastbound platform is directly linked by ramp and stairway to Morden Road. The town centre of Morden lies 0.5 mi (0.80 km) to the south. A pedestrian entrance to the National Trust's Morden Hall Park is on Morden Road just to the south of the stop.

The stop is interlinked as an out of station interchange (OSI) with South Wimbledon on the London Underground's Northern line. The two stations are classed as an interchange for ticketing purposes but both managed separately.

== Services ==
The typical off-peak service in trams per hour from Morden Road is:

- 6 tph in each direction between Beckenham Junction and Wimbledon
- 6 tph in each direction between Elmers End and Wimbledon

Services are operated using Bombardier CR4000 and Stadler Variobahn model low-floor trams.

Preceding station	Tramlink	Following station
Merton Park towards Wimbledon	Tramlink; Wimbledon to Beckenham Junction	Phipps Bridge towards Beckenham Junction
Merton Park towards Wimbledon	Tramlink; Wimbledon to Elmers End	Phipps Bridge towards Elmers End

== Connections ==
London Buses routes 93 and 470, and night route N155 serve the tram stop.

Free interchange for journeys made within an hour is available between trams and buses as part of Transport for London's Hopper Fare.

== Gallery ==
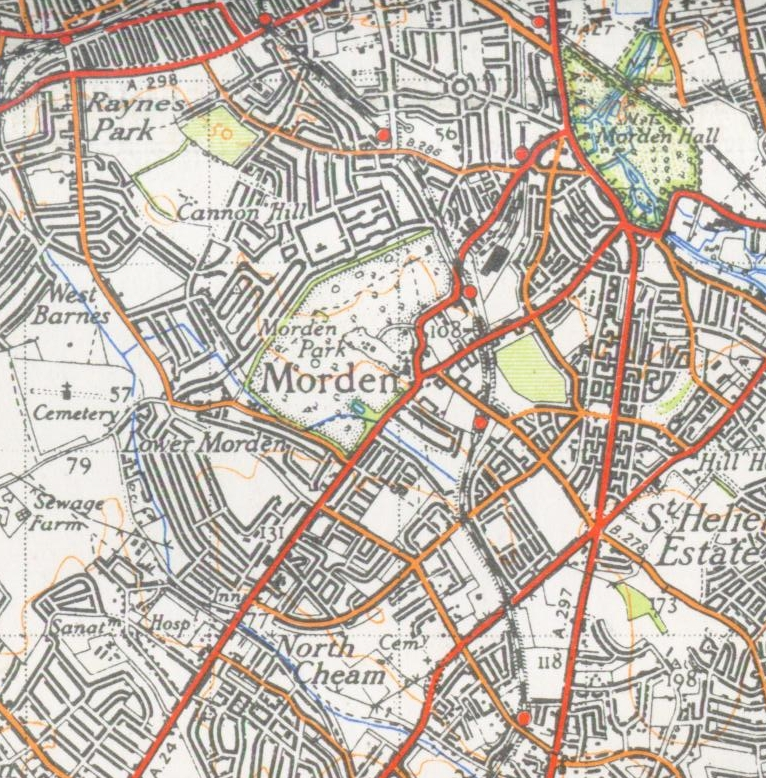
A 1944 Ordnance Survey of Morden area showing the location of the former station, now a tram stop

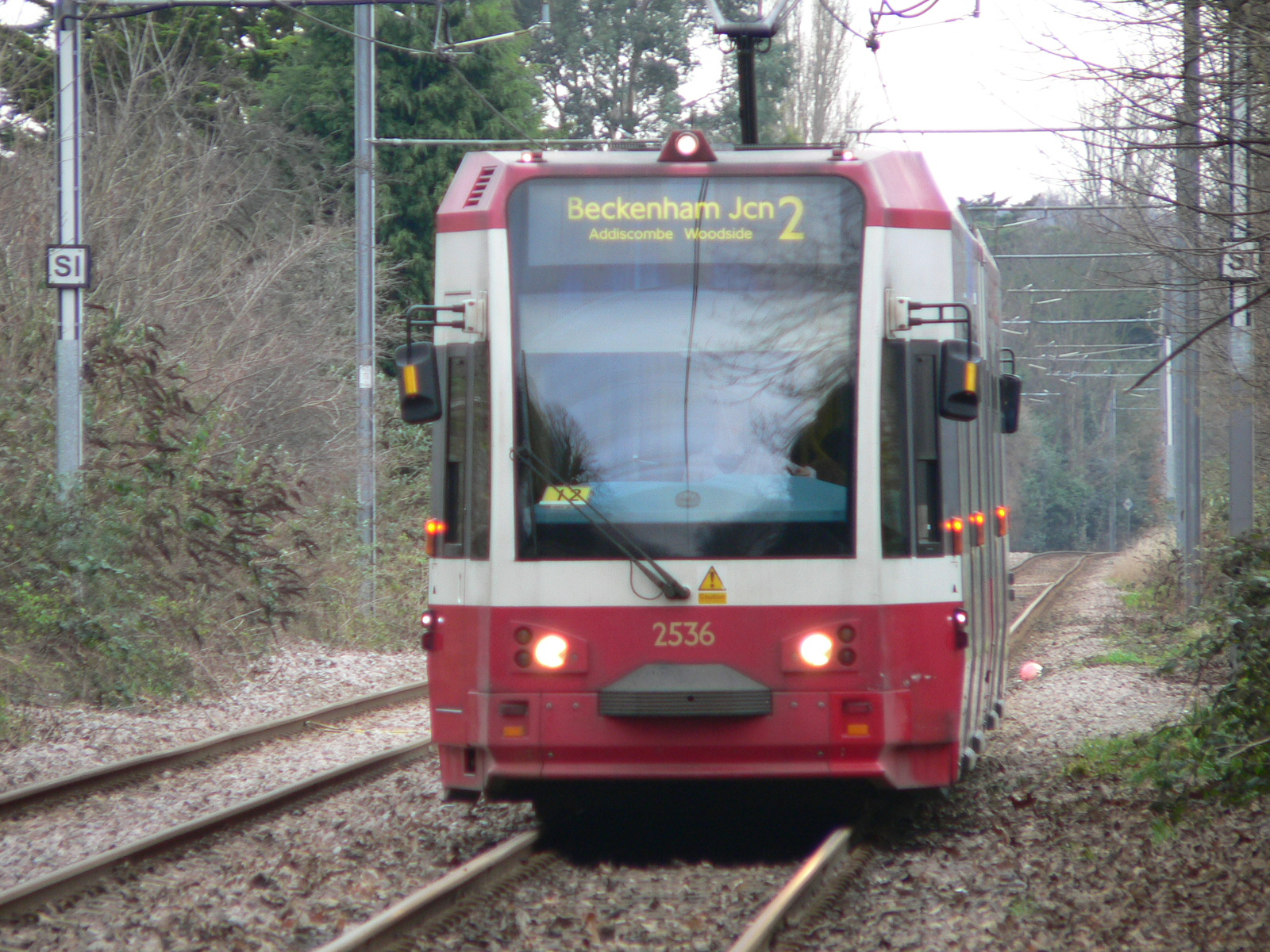
Tramlink tram 2536 approaches Morden Road tram stop with an eastbound route 2 service to Beckenham Junction station, 2006

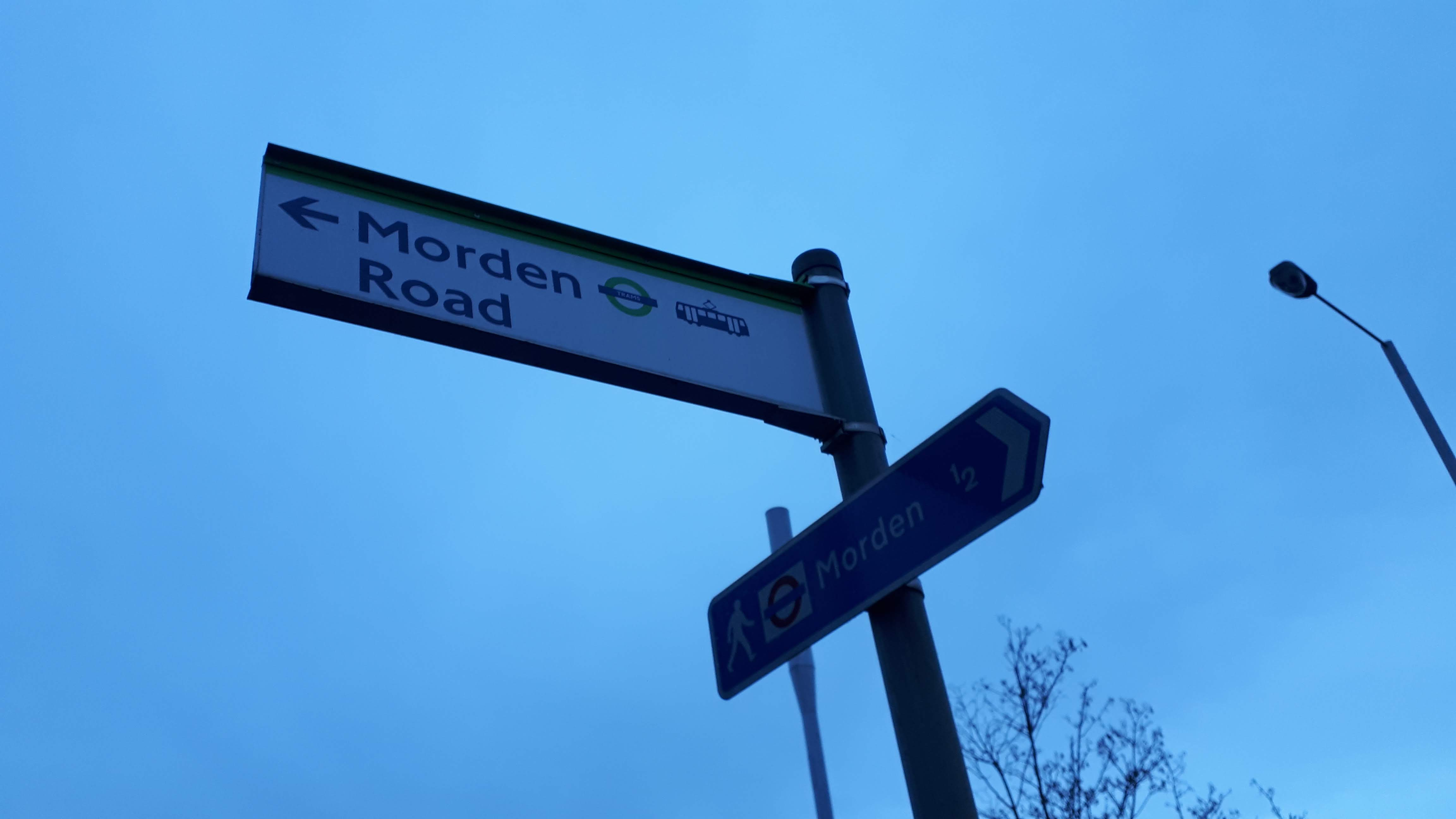
A sign directing passengers to Morden Road tram stop, or Morden tube station.
