= Wellesley Street =

Wellesley Street may refer to:

- Wellesley Street, Toronto, Ontario, Canada
- Wellesley Street, Auckland, New Zealand
- a street in the London Borough of Croydon; see Wellesley Road tram stop
