= Church Street tram stop =

Tramlink tram stop in London, England

Church Street
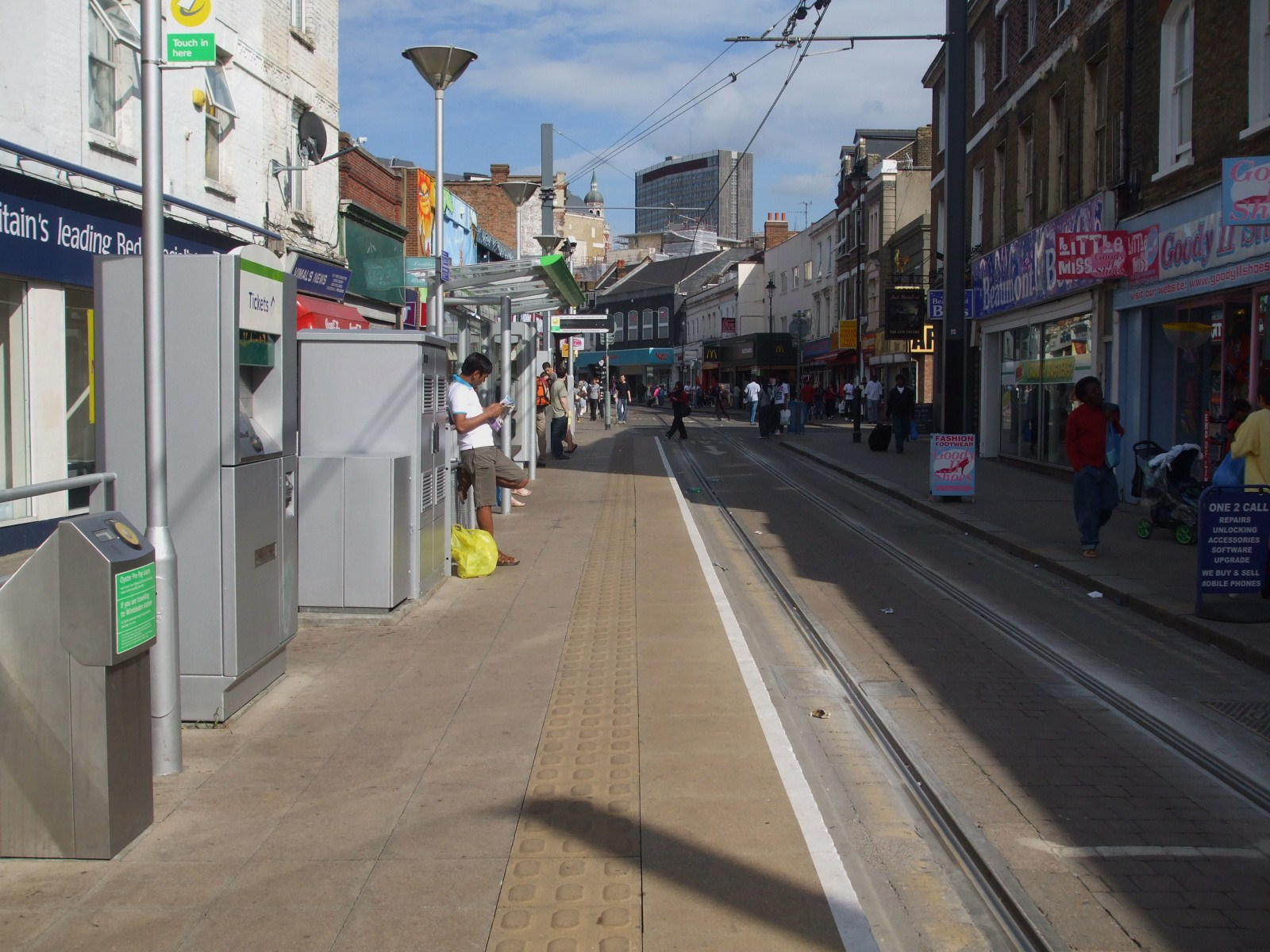
- Looking east

General information
- Location: Church Street, Croydon
- Coordinates: 51.37375°N 0.10455°W
- Operated by: Tramlink
- Platforms: 1

Construction
- Structure type: At-grade
- Accessible: Yes

Other information
- Status: Unstaffed
- Website: Official website

History
- Opened: 10 May 2000
Location
- Location in Croydon

Church Street is a tram stop for westbound Tramlink trams in central Croydon, England. It serves all routes, with routes either turning right to continue around the 'Croydon Loop', or carrying on westward towards Wimbledon and Therapia Lane.

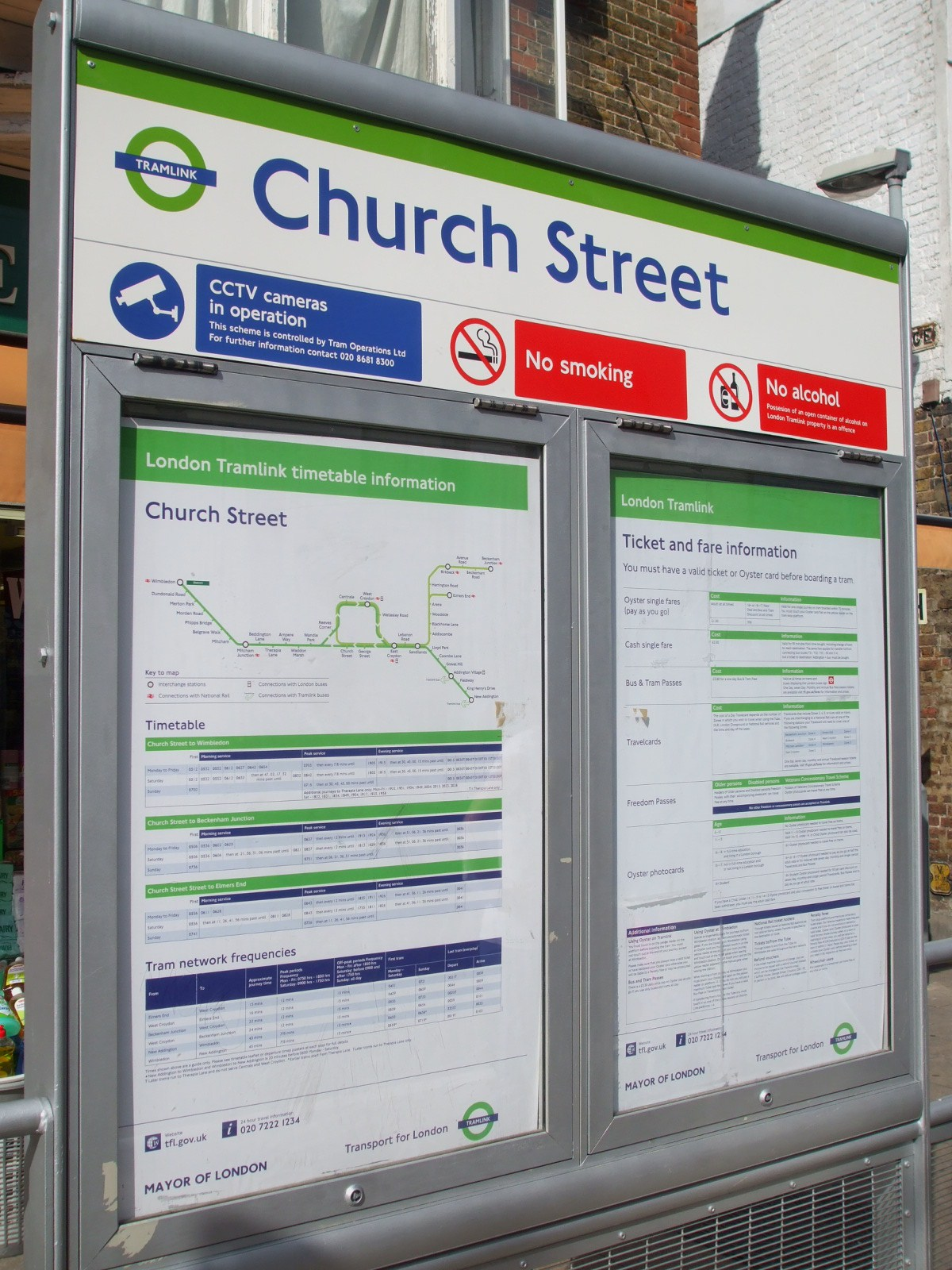
Church Street signage

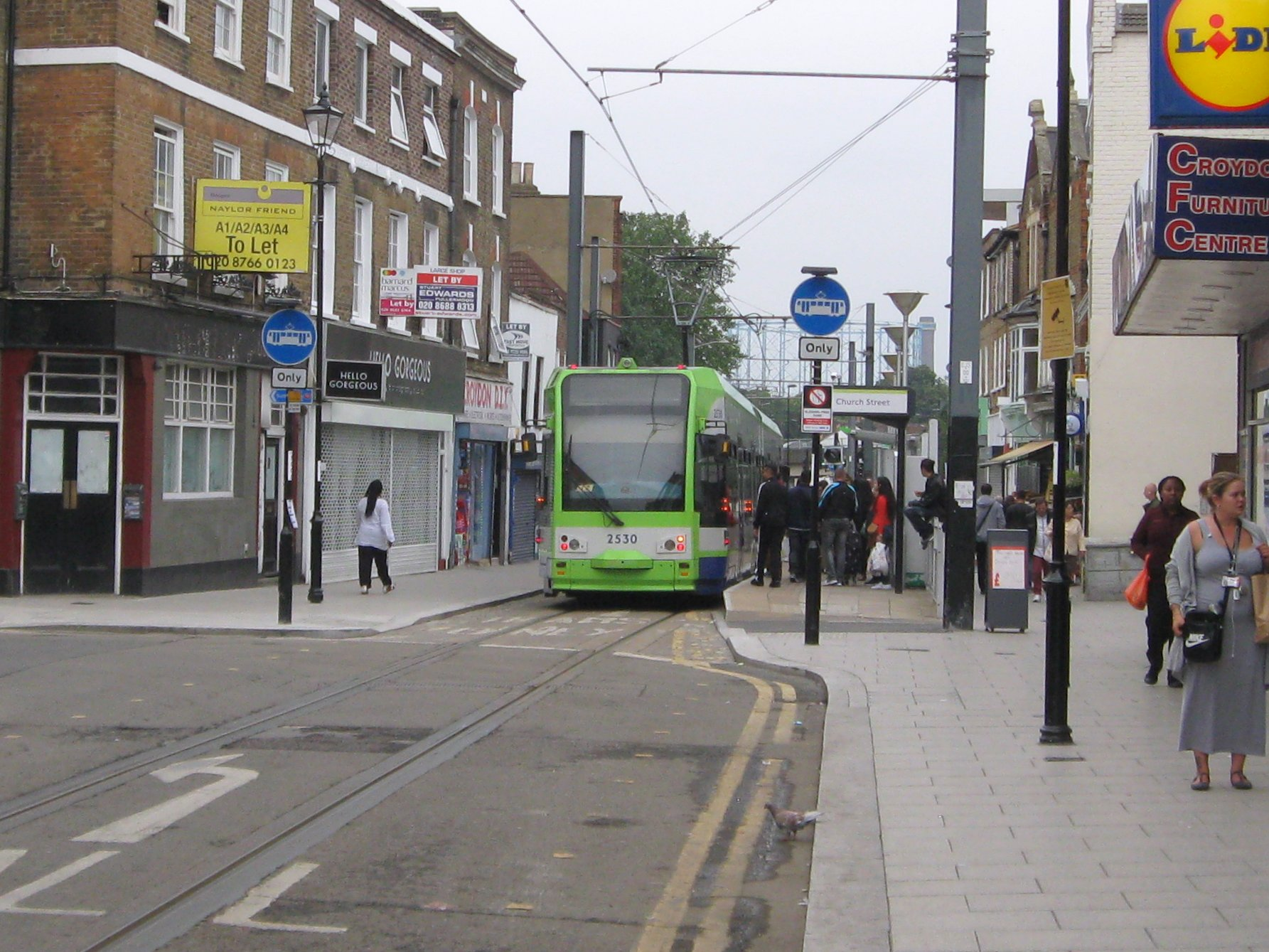
Tram no. 2530 at Church Street stop in August 2015

== Services ==
The typical off-peak service in trams per hour from Church Street is:

- 6 tph westbound only between Beckenham Junction and Wimbledon
- 6 tph westbound only between Elmers End and Wimbledon
- 8 tph westbound only between New Addington and West Croydon

Services are operated using Bombardier CR4000 and Stadler Variobahn model low-floor trams.

Preceding station	Tramlink	Following station
Wandle Park towards Wimbledon	Tramlink; Wimbledon to Beckenham Junction	George Street One-way operation
Wandle Park towards Wimbledon	Tramlink; Wimbledon to Elmers End	George Street One-way operation
Centrale towards West Croydon	Tramlink; New Addington to Croydon town centre	George Street One-way operation

== Connections ==
London Buses routes 157, 264, 407 and 410 serve the tram stop.

Free interchange for journeys made within an hour is available between trams and buses as part of Transport for London's Hopper Fare.
