= Tramlink =

Light rail tram system in South London

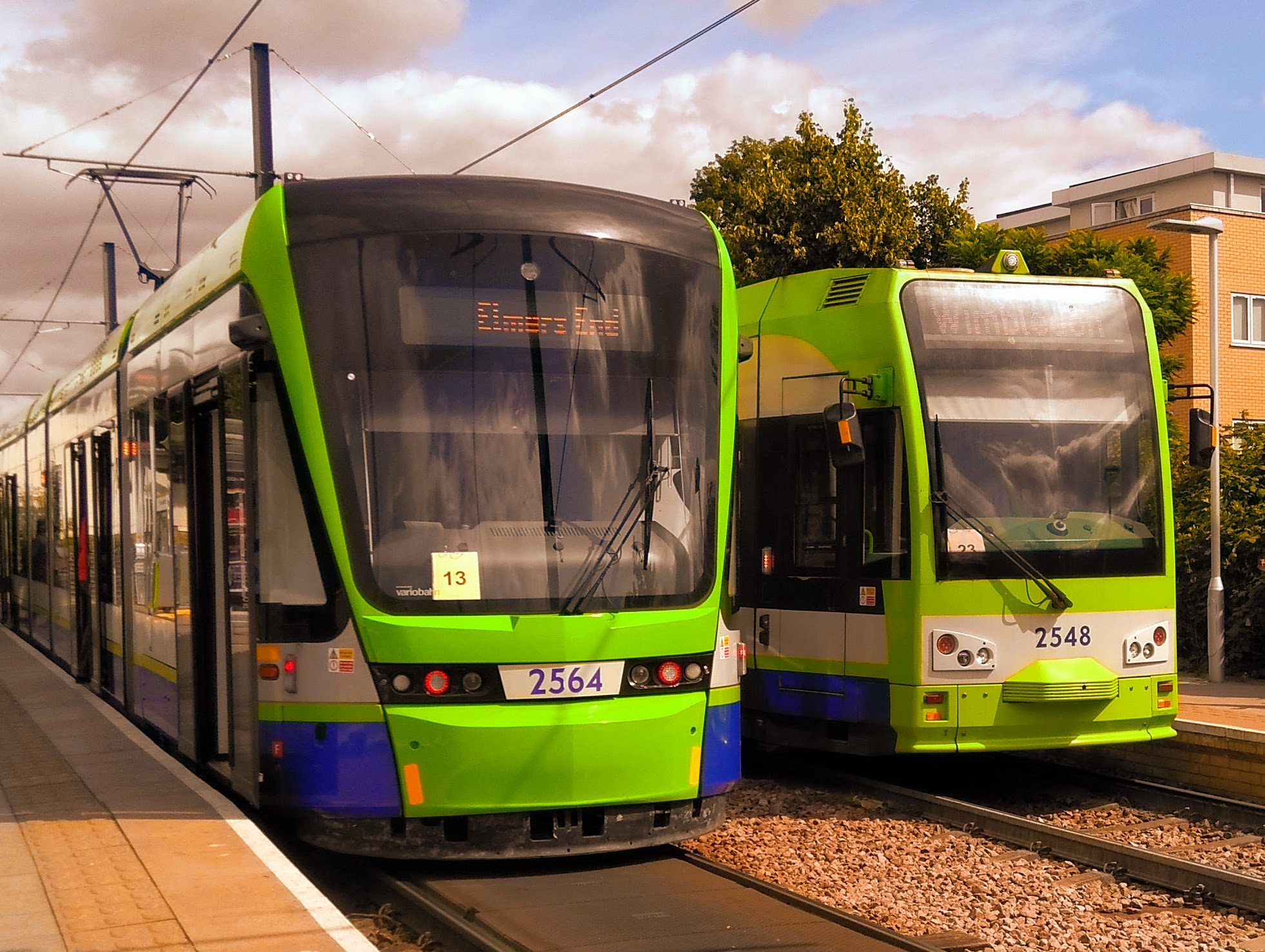
- Variobahn (left) and CR4000 (right) trams at Sandilands tram stop

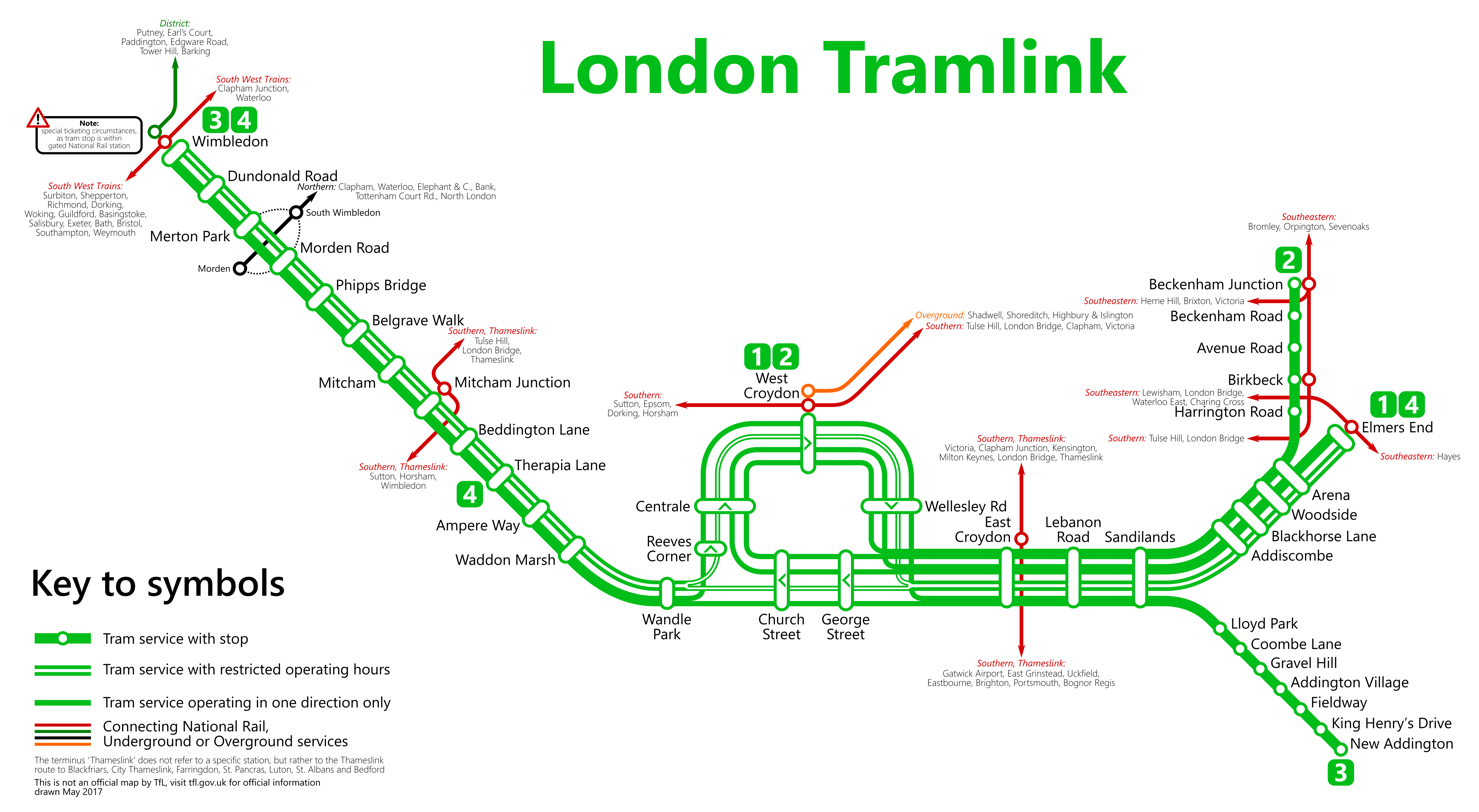
- System diagram

Overview
- Owner: Transport for London
- Area served: London Boroughs of: Croydon; Merton; Sutton; Bromley
- Locale: South London
- Transit type: Light rail using trams
- Number of stations: 39
- Annual ridership: 19.3 million (2025/26) ▲12%
- Website: www.tfl.gov.uk/modes/trams/

Operation
- Began operation: 10 May 2000; 26 years ago
- Operator: Tram Operations Ltd (FirstGroup)
- Number of vehicles: 23 Bombardier CR4000; 12 Stadler Variobahn

Technical
- System length: 28 km (17 mi)
- Track gauge: 1,435 mm (4 ft 8 1/2 in) standard gauge
- Electrification: Overhead line, 750 V DC
- Top speed: 80 km/h (50 mph)

Tramlink, previously Croydon Tramlink and currently branded as London Trams, is a light rail tram system serving Croydon and surrounding areas in South London, England. It is the first operational tram system serving the London region since 1952. Tramlink is managed by London Trams, a public body part of Transport for London (TfL), and has been operated by FirstGroup since 2017. It is one of two light rail networks in Greater London, the other being the Docklands Light Railway. Tramlink is the fourth-busiest light rail network in the UK behind the Docklands Light Railway, Manchester Metrolink and Tyne and Wear Metro.

Studies for the delivery of a modern-day tram system in Croydon began in the 1960s and detailed planning was performed in the 1980s. Approval of the scheme was received in 1990 and, following a competitive tender process, construction and initial operation of the tramway was undertaken by Tramtrack Croydon (TC) via a 99-year private finance initiative (PFI) contract. The official opening of Tramlink took place on 10 May 2000; by the end of the year three routes were operational. The network consists of 39 stops along 28 km (17 mi) of track, on a mixture of street track shared with other traffic, dedicated track in public roads, and off-street track consisting of new rights-of-way, former railway lines, and one right-of-way where the Tramlink track runs parallel to a third rail-electrified Network Rail line. The network's lines coincide in central Croydon, with eastern termini at Beckenham Junction, Elmers End and New Addington, and a western terminus at Wimbledon, where there is an interchange for London Underground.

Since its original opening, the tram network has been expanded and additional rolling stock has been purchased. During 2008, TfL took over Tramlink operations, ending the PFI and making the company a subsidiary of TfL. Additional rolling stock was introduced during the early 2010s. Furthermore, numerous extensions to the network have been discussed, the most recent of which is the Sutton Link, an extension to connect Sutton to Colliers Wood. Sutton Link was paused in 2020 until funding can be secured. In the 2020s, TfL began work to order new trams for the system.

== History ==
=== Inception ===
In the first half of the 20th century, Croydon had many tramlines. However, these were all closed, the first was the Addiscombe – East Croydon station route through George Street to Cherry Orchard Road in 1927 and the last to close was the Purley - Embankment and Croydon (Coombe Road) - Thornton Heath routes closed in April 1951. However, in the Spring of 1950, the Highways Committee were presented by the Mayor with the concept of running trams between East Croydon station and the new estate being constructed at New Addington. This was based on the fact that the Feltham cars used in Croydon were going to Leeds to serve their new estates on reserved tracks. During 1962, a private study with assistance from British Rail engineers showed how easy it was to convert the West Croydon–Wimbledon train service to tram operation and successfully prevent conflict between trams and trains.

These two concepts became joined in joint LRTL/TLRS concept of New Addington to Wimbledon every 15 minutes via East and West Croydon and Mitcham plus New Addington to Tattenham Corner every 15 minutes via East and West Croydon, Sutton and Epsom Downs. A branch into Forestdale to give an overlap service from Sutton was also included. During the 1970s, several BR directors and up-and-coming managers were aware of the advantages. Chris Green, upon becoming managing director, Network South East, published his plans in 1987 expanding the concept to take in the Tattenham Corner and Caterham branches and provide a service from Croydon to Lewisham via Addiscombe and Hayes. Following on from the opening of the DLR a small group working under Tony Ridley, then managing director, London Transport, investigated the potential for further light rail in London. The report 'Light Rail for London', written by engineer David Catling and Transport Planner Jon Willis, looked at a number of possible schemes including conversion of the East London Line. However a light rail network focussed on Croydon, with the conversion of existing heavy rail routes, was the most promising. The London Borough of Croydon wanted to improve access to the town centre without further road building and also improve access to the LCC built New Addington estate. Furthermore, road traffic in Croydon expanded considerably during the 1980s and planners were keen to apply public transit to fulfil the recorded growth in demand in the area. The project was developed by a small team in LT, headed by Scott McIntosh and in Croydon by Jill Lucas.

Croydon Tramlink Act 1994
- Act of Parliament
- Parliament of the United Kingdom
- Long title: An Act to empower London Regional Transport and Croydon London Borough Council to provide for the development and operation of a system of light rail transit in the London boroughs of Merton, Sutton, Croydon and Bromley; to authorise the construction of works and the acquisition of lands for that purpose; to confer further powers upon London Regional Transport and Croydon London Borough Council; and for other purposes.
- Citation: 1994 c. xi

Dates
- Royal assent: 21 July 1994

Status: Current legislation

Text of statute as originally enacted

The scheme was accepted in principle in February 1990 by Croydon Council who worked with what was then London Regional Transport (LRT) to propose Tramlink to Parliament. The Croydon Tramlink Act 1994 (c. xi) resulted, which gave LRT the power to build and run Tramlink.

=== Construction ===
Both the delivery and operation of the tramway was accomplished via a competitive tender process. During November 1995, it was announced that four consortia were shortlisted to build, operate and maintain Tramlink:

- Altram: John Laing, Ansaldo, Serco
- Croydon Connect: Tarmac, AEG, Transdev
- CT Light Rail Group: GEC Alsthom, Mowlem, Welsh Water
- Tramtrack Croydon: CentreWest, Royal Bank of Scotland, Sir Robert McAlpine, Amey, Bombardier Transportation

In May 1996, Tramtrack Croydon (TC) was awarded a 99-year Private Finance Initiative (PFI) contract to design, build, operate and maintain Tramlink. The equity partners in TC were Amey (50%), Royal Bank of Scotland (20%), 3i (20%) and Sir Robert McAlpine with Bombardier Transportation contracted to build and maintain the trams and FirstGroup operate the service. TC retained the revenue generated by Tramlink and LRT had to pay compensation to TC for any changes to the fares and ticketing policy introduced later. The concession agreement with TC was signed in November 1996, allowing construction to begin.

Construction work started in January 1997, with an expected opening in November 1999. The first tram was delivered in October 1998 to the new depot at Therapia Lane and testing on the sections of the Wimbledon line began shortly afterwards. Part of its track is the original route of the Surrey Iron Railway that opened in 1803.

=== Opening ===
The official opening of Tramlink took place on 10 May 2000 when route 3 from Croydon to New Addington opened to the public. Route 2 from Croydon to Beckenham Junction followed on 23 May 2000, and route 1 from Elmers End to Wimbledon opened a week later on 30 May 2000. It was the first modern tram project in London, with low-floor trams and low platforms allowing accessibility for all. The new trams were numbered from 2530, following on from the last of the old trams withdrawn in the early 1950s.

=== Buyout by Transport for London ===
In March 2008, TfL announced that it had reached agreement to buy TC for £98 million. The purchase was finalised on 28 June 2008. The background to this purchase relates to the requirement that TfL (who took over from London Regional Transport in 2000) compensates TC for the consequences of any changes to the fares and ticketing policy introduced since 1996. In 2007, that payment was £4 million, with an annual increase in rate. Despite this change, FirstGroup continues to operate the service.

During October 2008, TfL introduced a new livery, using the blue, white and green of the routes on TfL maps, to distinguish the trams from buses operating in the area. The colour of the cars was changed to green, and the brand name was changed from Croydon Tramlink to simply Tramlink. The rebranding work was completed in early 2009.

=== Additional stop and trams ===
Centrale tram stop, in Tamworth Road on the one-way central loop, opened on 10 December 2005, increasing journey times slightly. As turnround times were already quite tight, this raised the issue of buying an extra tram to maintain punctuality. Partly for this reason, but also to take into account the planned restructuring of services, (subsequently introduced in July 2006), TfL issued tenders for a new tram. However, nothing resulted from this.

In January 2011, TfL opened a tender for the supply of ten new or second-hand trams from the end of summer 2011, for use between Therapia Lane and Elmers End. On 18 August 2011, TfL announced that Stadler Rail had won a £16.3 million contract to supply six Variobahn trams similar to those used by Bybanen in Bergen, Norway. They entered service in 2012. In August 2013, TfL ordered an additional four Variobahn trams for delivery in 2015, for use on the Wimbledon to Croydon link, an order later increased to six. This brought the total Variobahn fleet up to ten in 2015, and 12 in 2016 when the final two trams were delivered.

== Current network ==
=== Stops ===
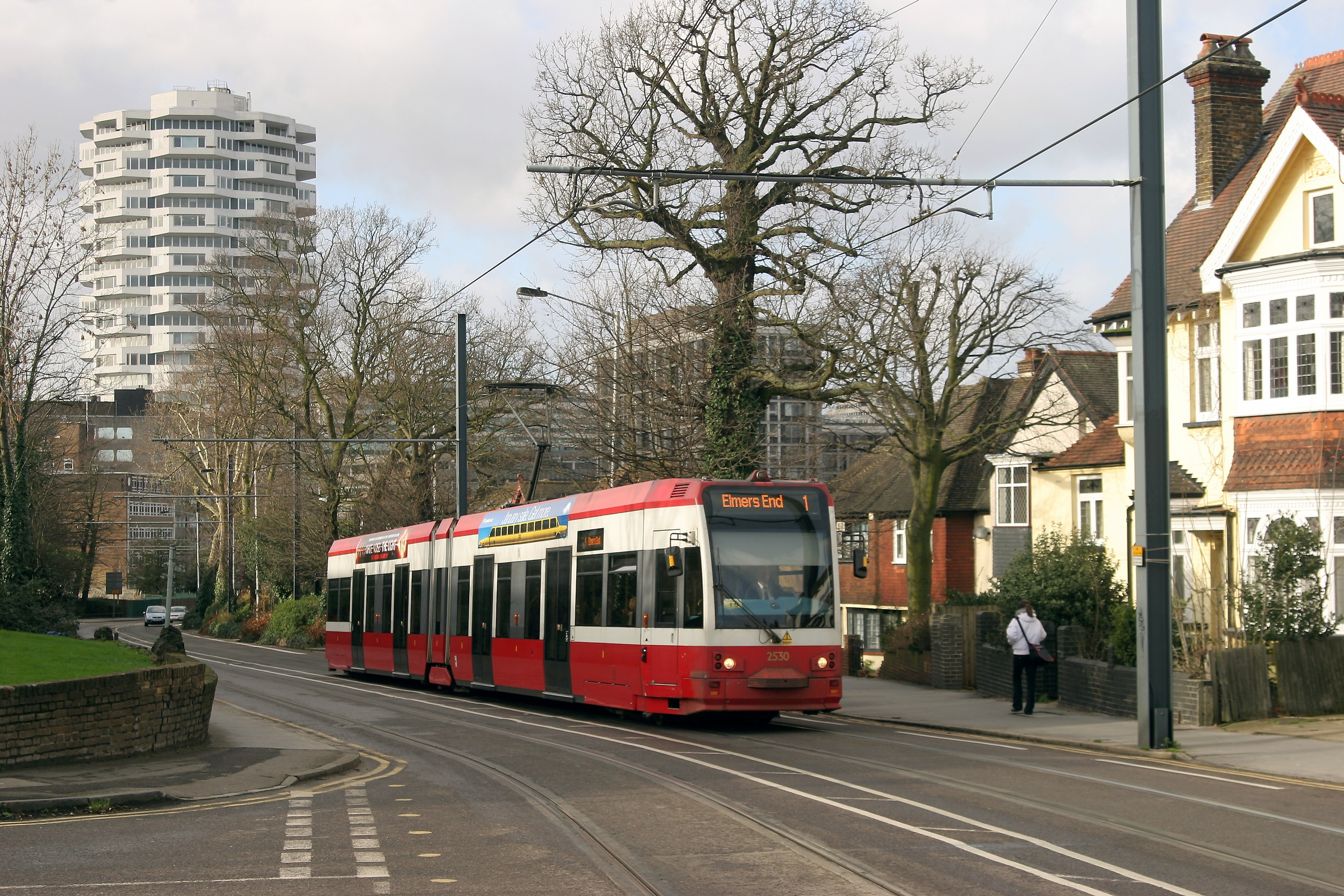
Tram 2530 leaving Croydon on an Elmers End service in 2007

There are 39 stops, with 38 opened in the initial phase, and Centrale tram stop added on 10 December 2005. Most stops are 32.2 m (105 ft 8 in) long. The tram stops have low platforms, 35 cm (14 in) above rail level, virtually level with the doors. This level access from platform to tram allows wheelchairs, prams, pushchairs and the elderly to board easily with no steps. In street sections, the stop is integrated with the pavement. All platforms are all wider than 2 m (6 ft 7 in). Tramlink uses some former main-line stations on the Wimbledon–West Croydon and Elmers End–Coombe Lane stretches of line. The railway platforms have been demolished and rebuilt to Tramlink specifications, except at Elmers End and Wimbledon where the track level was raised to meet the higher main-line platforms to enable cross-platform interchange.

Stops are unstaffed and had automated ticket machines that are no longer in use due to TfL making trams cashless. In general, access between the platforms involves crossing the tracks by pedestrian level crossing. Stops also feature CCTV, a Passenger Help Point, a Passenger Information Display (PID), litter bins, a noticeboard and lamp-posts, and most also have seats and a shelter. The PIDs display the destinations and expected arrival times of the next three trams. They can also display any message the controllers want to display, such as information on delays or even safety instructions for vandals to stop putting rubbish or other objects onto the track.

=== Routes ===
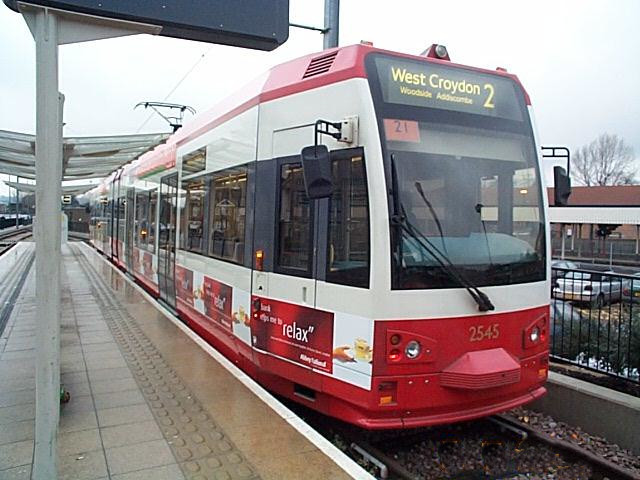
Tram 2545 in original livery at Beckenham Junction in 2001

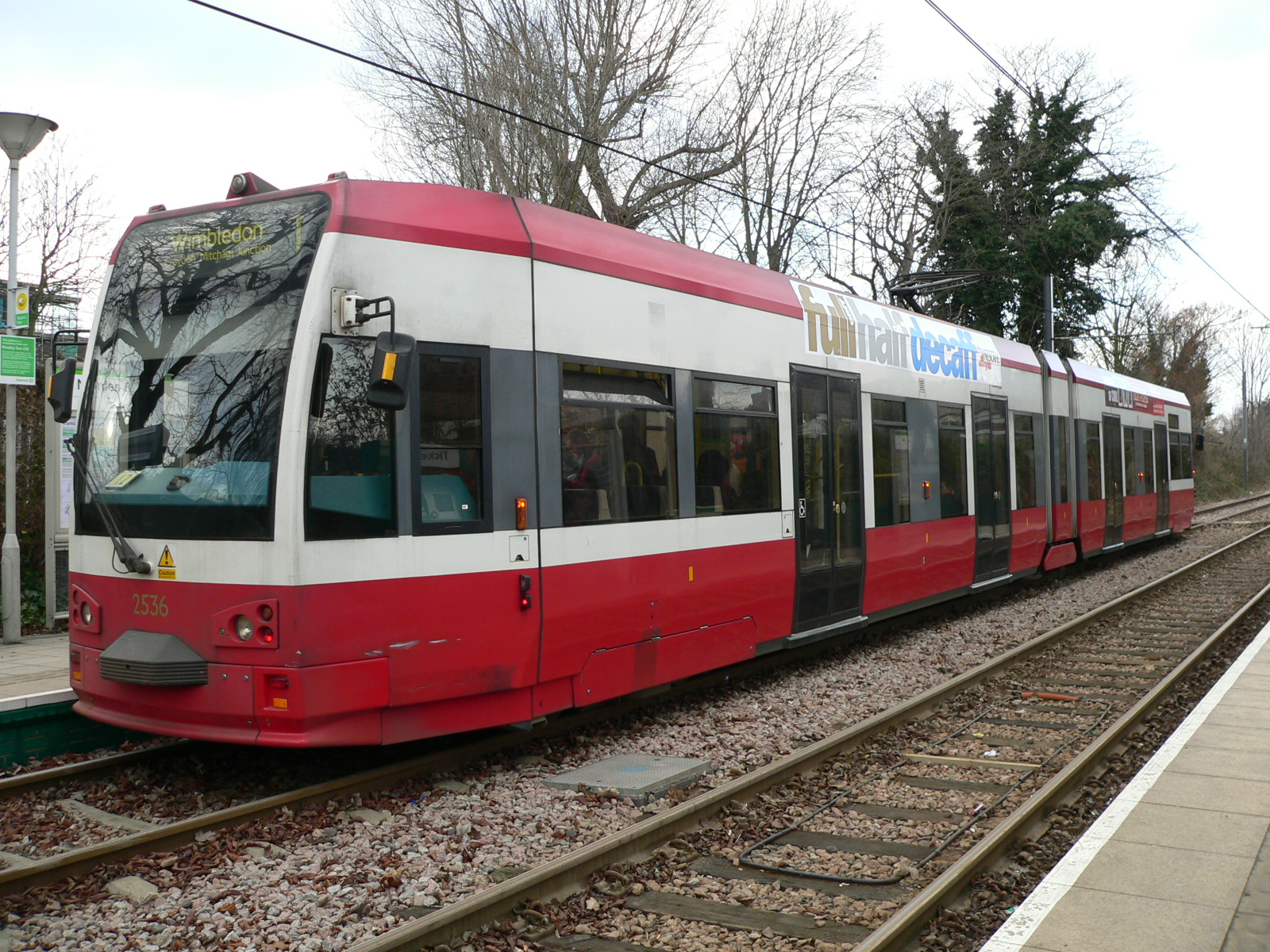
Tram 2536 in the second livery at Morden Road, heading towards Wimbledon in 2006

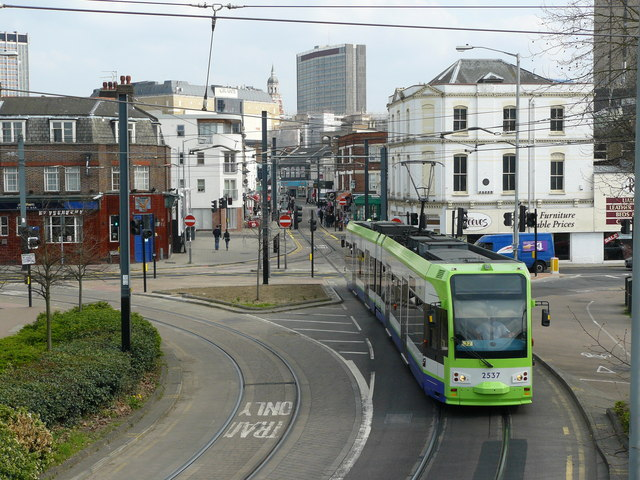
A tram leaving Croydon towards Wimbledon, going past Reeves Corner in 2009

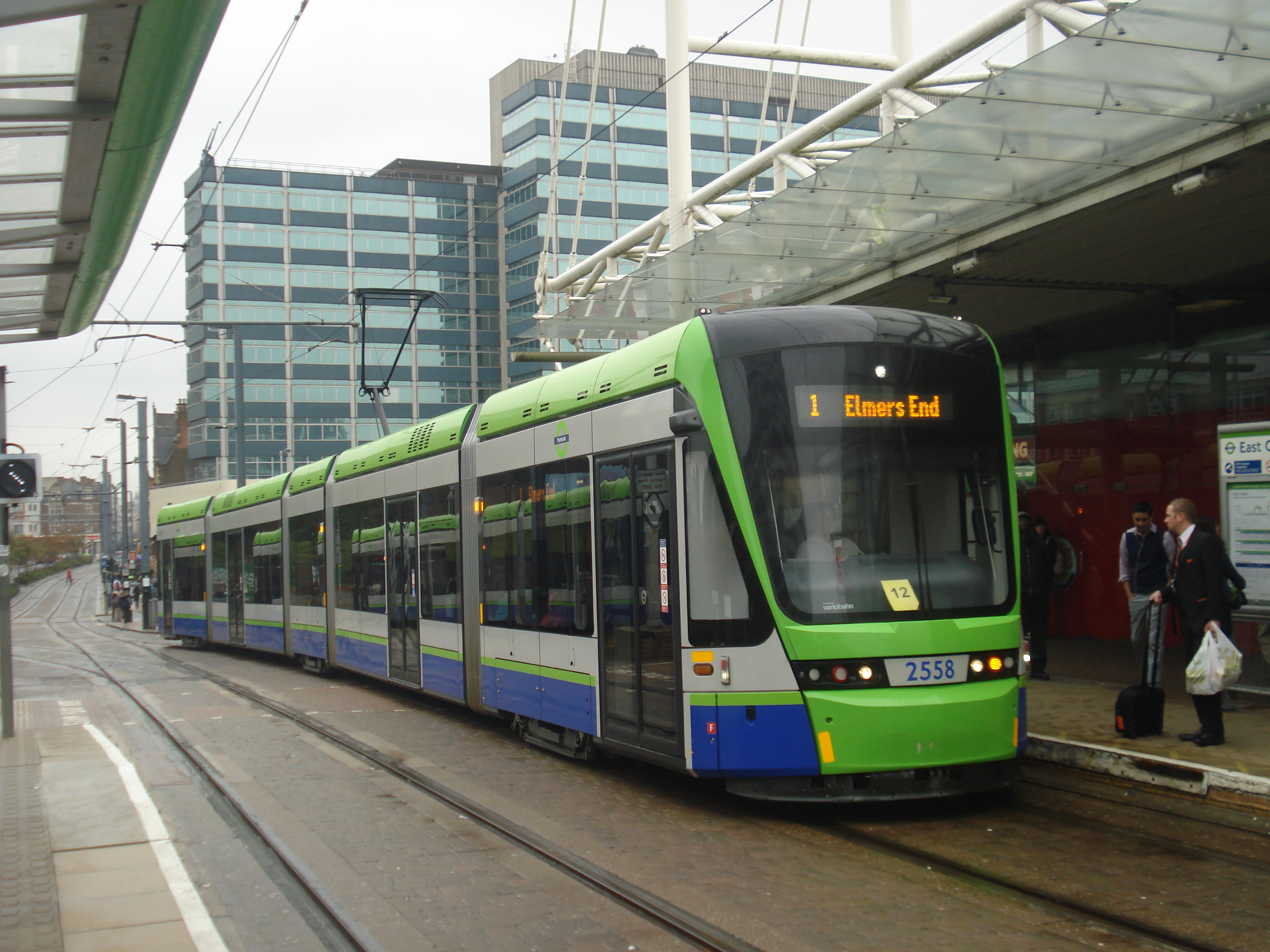
Tram 2558 at East Croydon in 2013

Tramlink has been shown on the principal tube map since 1 June 2016, having previously appeared only on the "London Connections" map.

When Tramlink first opened it had three routes: Line 1 (yellow) from Wimbledon to Elmers End, Line 2 (red) from Croydon to Beckenham Junction, and Line 3 (green) from Croydon to New Addington. On 23 July 2006, the network was restructured, with Route 1 from Elmers End to Croydon, Route 2 from Beckenham Junction to Croydon and Route 3 from New Addington to Wimbledon. On 25 June 2012, Route 4 from Therapia Lane to Elmers End was introduced. On 4 April 2016, Route 4 was extended from Therapia Lane to Wimbledon.

On 25 February 2018, the network and timetables were restructured again for more even and reliable services. As part of this change, trams would no longer display route numbers on their dot matrix destination screens. This resulted in three routes:

- New Addington to West Croydon, returning to New Addington every 7–8 minutes (every 10 minutes on Sunday shopping hours and every 15 minutes at late evenings).
- Wimbledon to Beckenham Junction every 10 minutes (every 15 minutes on Sundays and late evening)
- Wimbledon to Elmers End every 10 minutes (every 15 minutes on Sundays and terminates at Croydon in late evening every 15 minutes)

Additionally, the first two trams from New Addington will run to Wimbledon. Overall, this would result in a decrease in 2tph leaving Elmers End, resulting in a 25% decrease in capacity here, and 14% in the Addiscombe area. However, this would also regulate waiting times in this area and on the Wimbledon branch to every five minutes, from every two–seven minutes.

Wimbledon to Elmers End
- Terminus: Elmers End
- Arena
- Woodside
- Blackhorse Lane
- Addiscombe
- Sandilands
- Lebanon Road
- East Croydon
  Trains to Gatwick and Luton
- George Street
- Church Street
- Wandle Park
- Waddon Marsh (for Purley Way retail parks)
- Ampere Way (for Valley Park retail park)
- Therapia Lane
- Beddington Lane
- Mitcham Junction
- Mitcham
- Belgrave Walk
- Phipps Bridge
- Morden Road
- Merton Park
- Dundonald Road
- Wimbledon

Then back to Wandle Park

- Reeves Corner
- Centrale
- West Croydon
- Wellesley Road

Then to East Croydon and back to Elmers End

Wimbledon to Beckenham Junction
- Terminus: Beckenham Junction
- Beckenham Road
- Avenue Road
- Birkbeck
- Harrington Road
- Arena
- Woodside
- Blackhorse Lane
- Addiscombe
- Sandilands
- Lebanon Road
- East Croydon
  Trains to Gatwick and Luton
- George Street
- Church Street
- Wandle Park
- Waddon Marsh (for Purley Way retail parks)
- Ampere Way (for Valley Park retail park)
- Therapia Lane
- Beddington Lane
- Mitcham Junction
- Mitcham
- Belgrave Walk
- Phipps Bridge
- Morden Road
- Merton Park
- Dundonald Road
- Wimbledon

Then back to Wandle Park

- Reeves Corner
- Centrale
- West Croydon
- Wellesley Road

Then to East Croydon and back to Beckenham Junction

New Addington to West Croydon
- Terminus: New Addington
- King Henry's Drive
- Fieldway
- Addington Village
- Gravel Hill
- Coombe Lane
- Lloyd Park
- Sandilands
- Lebanon Road
- East Croydon
  Trains to Gatwick and Luton
- George Street
- Church Street
- Centrale
- West Croydon
- Wellesley Road

Then to East Croydon and back to New Addington

=== Former lines reused ===
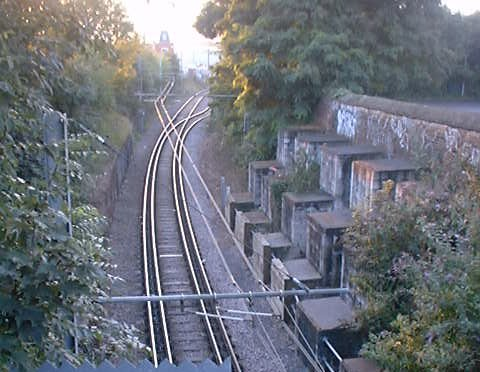
Interlaced track near Mitcham

Tramlink makes use of a number of National Rail lines, running parallel to franchised services, or in some cases, runs on previously abandoned railway corridors. Between Birkbeck and Beckenham Junction, Tramlink uses the Crystal Palace line, running on a single track alongside the track carrying Southern rail services. The National Rail track had been singled some years earlier, although the track placement had to be altered, especially at Birkbeck where the railway platform in use was to be taken by the trams and the old down platform had to be brought back into use.

From Elmers End to Woodside, Tramlink follows the former Addiscombe Line. At Woodside, the old station buildings stand disused, and the original platforms have been replaced by accessible low platforms. Tramlink then follows the former Woodside and South Croydon Railway (W&SCR) to reach the current Addiscombe tram stop, adjacent to the site of the demolished Bingham Road railway station. It continues along the former railway route to near Sandilands, where Tramlink curves sharply towards Sandilands tram stop. Another route from Sandilands tram stop curves sharply on to the W&SCR before passing through Park Hill (or Sandilands) tunnels and to the site of Coombe Road station after which it curves away across Lloyd Park.

Between Wimbledon station and Wandle Park, Tramlink follows the former West Croydon to Wimbledon Line, which was first opened in 1855 and closed on 31 May 1997 to allow for conversion into Tramlink. Within this section, from near Phipps Bridge to near Reeves Corner, Tramlink follows the Surrey Iron Railway, giving Tramlink a claim to one of the world's oldest railway alignments. Beyond Wandle Park, a Victorian footbridge beside Waddon New Road was dismantled to make way for the flyover over the West Croydon to Sutton railway line. The footbridge has been re-erected at Corfe Castle station on the Swanage Railway (although some evidence suggests that this was a similar footbridge removed from the site of Merton Park railway station).

=== Onboard announcements ===
The onboard announcements are by BBC News reader (and tram enthusiast) Nicholas Owen. The announcement pattern is as follows: e.g. "This tram is for Wimbledon; the next stop will be Merton Park".

== Rolling stock ==
=== Current fleet ===
Tramlink currently uses 35 trams. In summary:

Class	Image	Type	Top speed		Length metres	Capacity			Number built	Number in service	Fleet numbers	Routes operated	Built	Years operated
Class	Image	Type	mph	km/h	Length metres	Std	Sdg	Total	Number built	Number in service	Fleet numbers	Routes operated	Built	Years operated
Bombardier CR4000		Tram	50	80	30.1	70	138	208	24	23	2530-2553	All lines	1998–1999	2000–present
Stadler Variobahn		Tram	50	80	32	72	134	206	6		2554-2559	All lines	2011–2012	2012–present
Stadler Variobahn		Tram	50	80	32	72	134	206	6		2560-2565	All lines	2014–2016	2015–present
Total									36	35				

==== Bombardier CR4000 ====
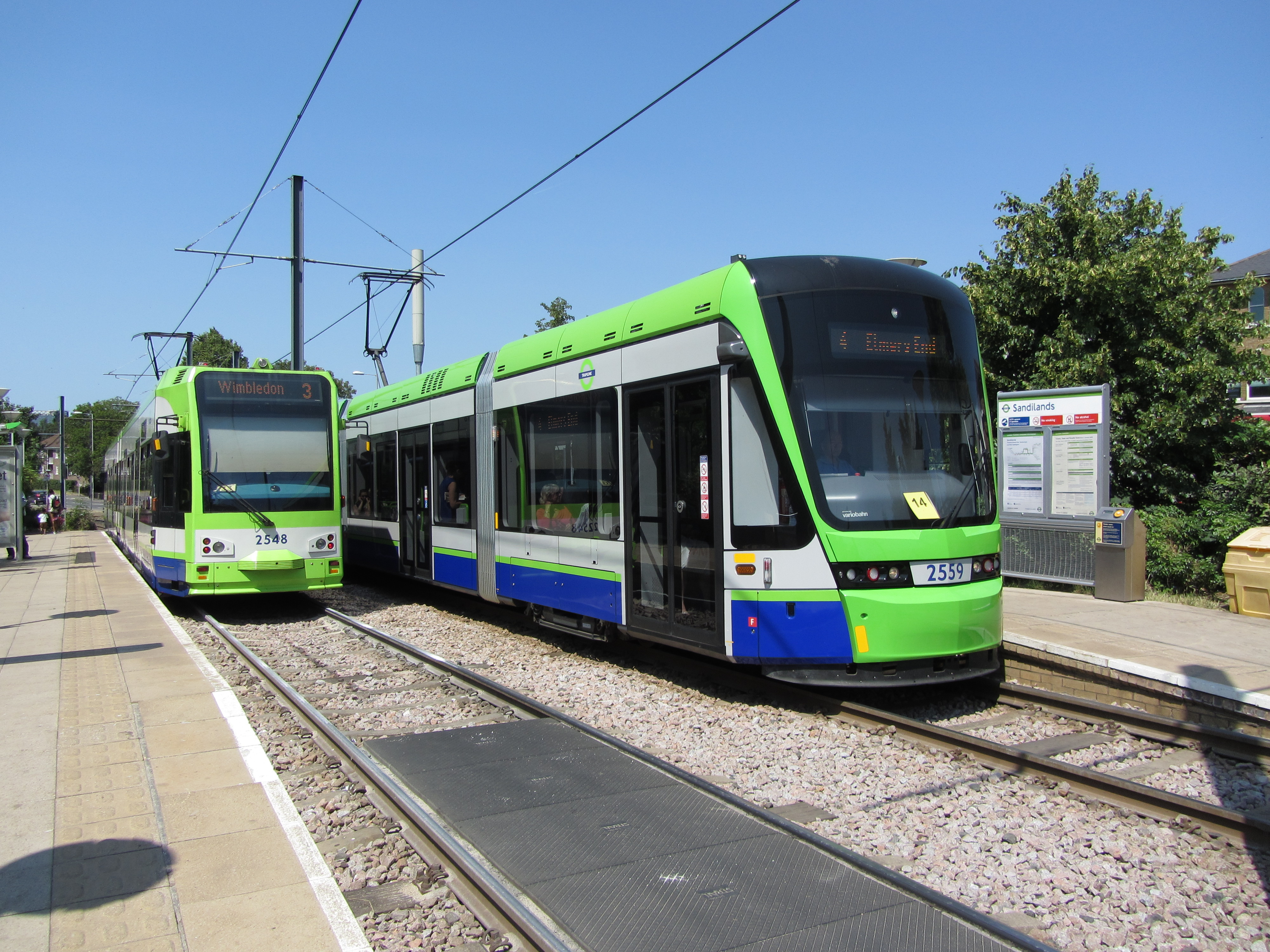
A Variobahn (right) and a CR4000 at Sandilands tram stop in 2013

The original fleet comprised 24 articulated low floor Bombardier Flexity Swift CR4000 trams built in Vienna numbered beginning at 2530, continuing from the highest-numbered tram 2529 on London's former tram network, which closed in 1952. The original livery was red and white. One (2550) was painted in FirstGroup white, blue and pink livery. During 2006, the CR4000 fleet was refreshed, with the bus-style destination roller blinds being replaced with a digital dot-matrix display. Between 2008 and 2009 the fleet was repainted externally in the new green livery and the interiors were refurbished with new flooring, seat covers retrimmed in a new moquette and stanchions repainted from yellow to green. One (2551) has been permanently withdrawn having been significantly damaged in the 2016 Croydon tram derailment on 9 November 2016.

In 2007, tram 2535 was named after Stephen Parascandolo, a well known tram enthusiast.

==== Croydon Variobahn ====
In January 2011, Tramtrack Croydon invited tenders for the supply of then new or second-hand trams, and on 18 August 2011, TfL announced that Stadler Rail had won a £16.3 million contract to supply six Variobahn trams similar to those used by Bybanen in Bergen, Norway. They entered service during 2012. In August 2013, TfL ordered an additional four Variobahn trams for delivery in 2015, an order that was later increased to six. This brought the total Variobahn fleet up to ten in 2015, and 12 in 2016 when the final two trams were delivered.

=== Ancillary vehicles ===
Engineers' vehicles used in Tramlink construction were hired for that purpose.

In November 2006, Tramlink purchased five second-hand engineering vehicles from Deutsche Bahn. These were two DB class Klv 53 engineers' trams (numbered 058 and 059 in Tramlink service), and three 4-wheel wagons (numbered 060, 061, and 062). Service tram 058 and trailer 061 were both sold to the National Tramway Museum in 2010.

=== Future fleet ===
In the 2020s, TfL began work to replace the CR4000 tram fleet, which are approaching their end of its life and becoming increasingly unreliable. In June 2023, one-fifth of the CR4000 fleet was temporarily withdrawn due to issues with their wheels.

In January 2024, Tramtrack Croydon invited tenders for a base order of 24 new trams with an option for 16 more and a 30-year technical support contract, costed at £385 million. In September 2024, TfL announced that four manufacturers (Alstom, Construcciones y Auxiliar de Ferrocarriles, Hitachi Rail and Stadler Rail Valencia) had been invited to place bids, with a view to the trams entering service by the late 2020s. The new fleet is intended to replace the CR4000 trams, which are reaching the end of their design life. As of May 2026, following a capital funding settlement with the government in 2025, TfL expects to award the contract for the 24 trams by February 2027, for entry into service in the early 2030s, with options to replace the entire fleet.

== Fares and ticketing ==
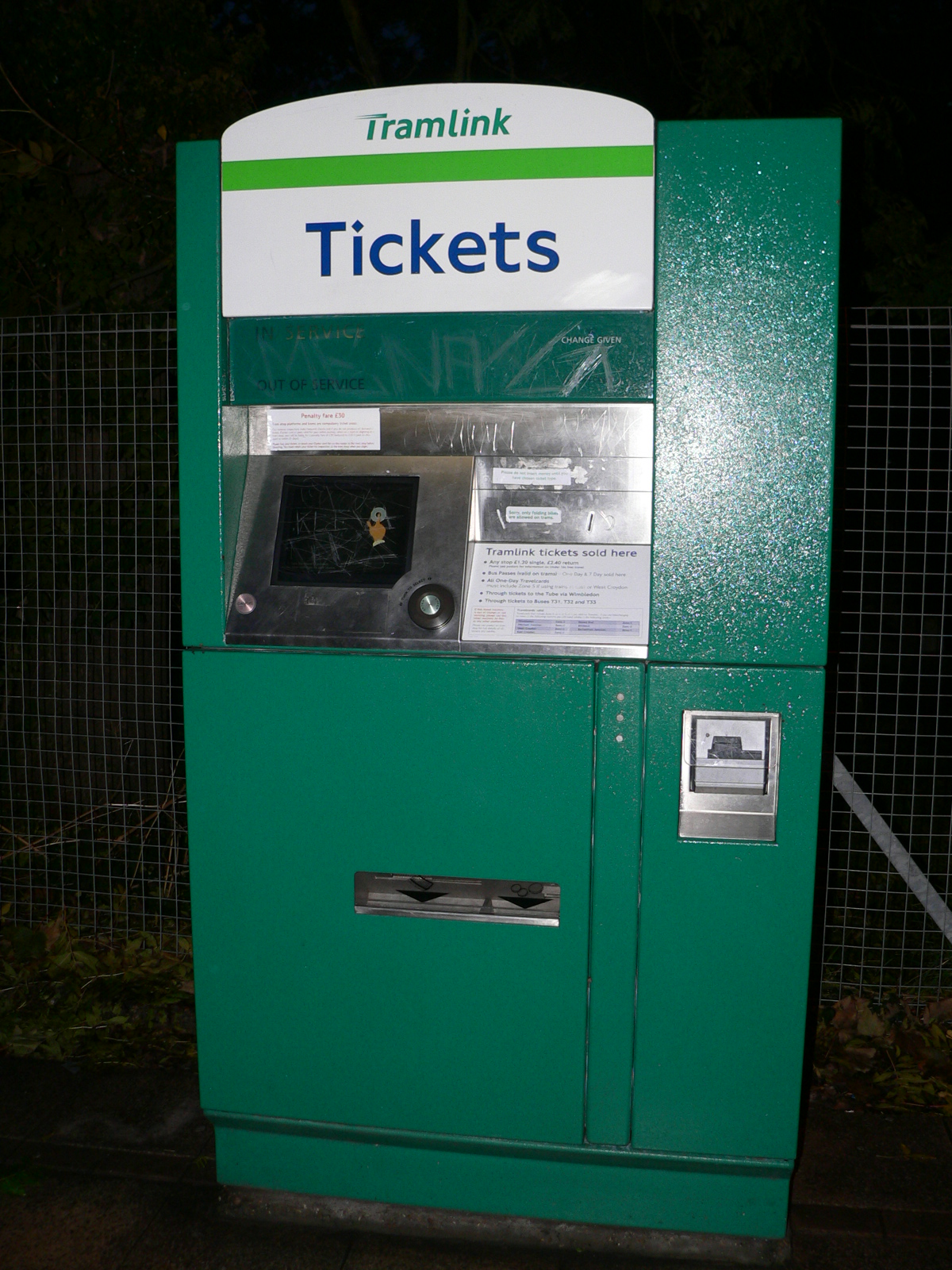
A former Tramlink ticket machine

TfL Bus & Tram Passes are valid on Tramlink, as are Travelcards that include any of zones 3, 4, 5 and 6.

Pay-as-you-go Oyster card fares are the same as on London Buses, although special fares may apply when using Tramlink feeder buses.

When using Oyster cards, passengers must touch in on the platform before boarding the tram. Special arrangements apply at Wimbledon station, where the Tramlink stop is within the National Rail and London Underground station. Tramlink passengers must therefore touch in at the station entry barriers then again at the Tramlink platform to inform the system that no mainline/LUL rail journey has been made.

Contactless payment cards can also be used to pay for fares in the same manner as Oyster cards. Ticket machines were withdrawn on 16 July 2018.

== Corporate affairs ==
=== Ownership and structure ===
The service was created as a result of the Croydon Tramlink Act 1994 that received Royal Assent on 21 July 1994, a Private Bill jointly promoted by London Regional Transport (the predecessor of Transport for London (TfL)) and Croydon London Borough Council. Following a competitive tender, a consortium company Tramtrack Croydon Limited (incorporated in 1995) was awarded a 99-year concession to build and run the system. On 17 March 2008, it was announced that TfL would take over Tramlink in exchange for £98 million. Since 28 June 2008, the company has been a subsidiary of TfL.

Tramlink is currently operated by Tram Operations Ltd (TOL), a subsidiary of FirstGroup, who have a contract to operate the service until 2030. TOL provides the drivers and management to operate the service; the infrastructure and trams are owned and maintained by a TfL subsidiary.

=== Business trends ===
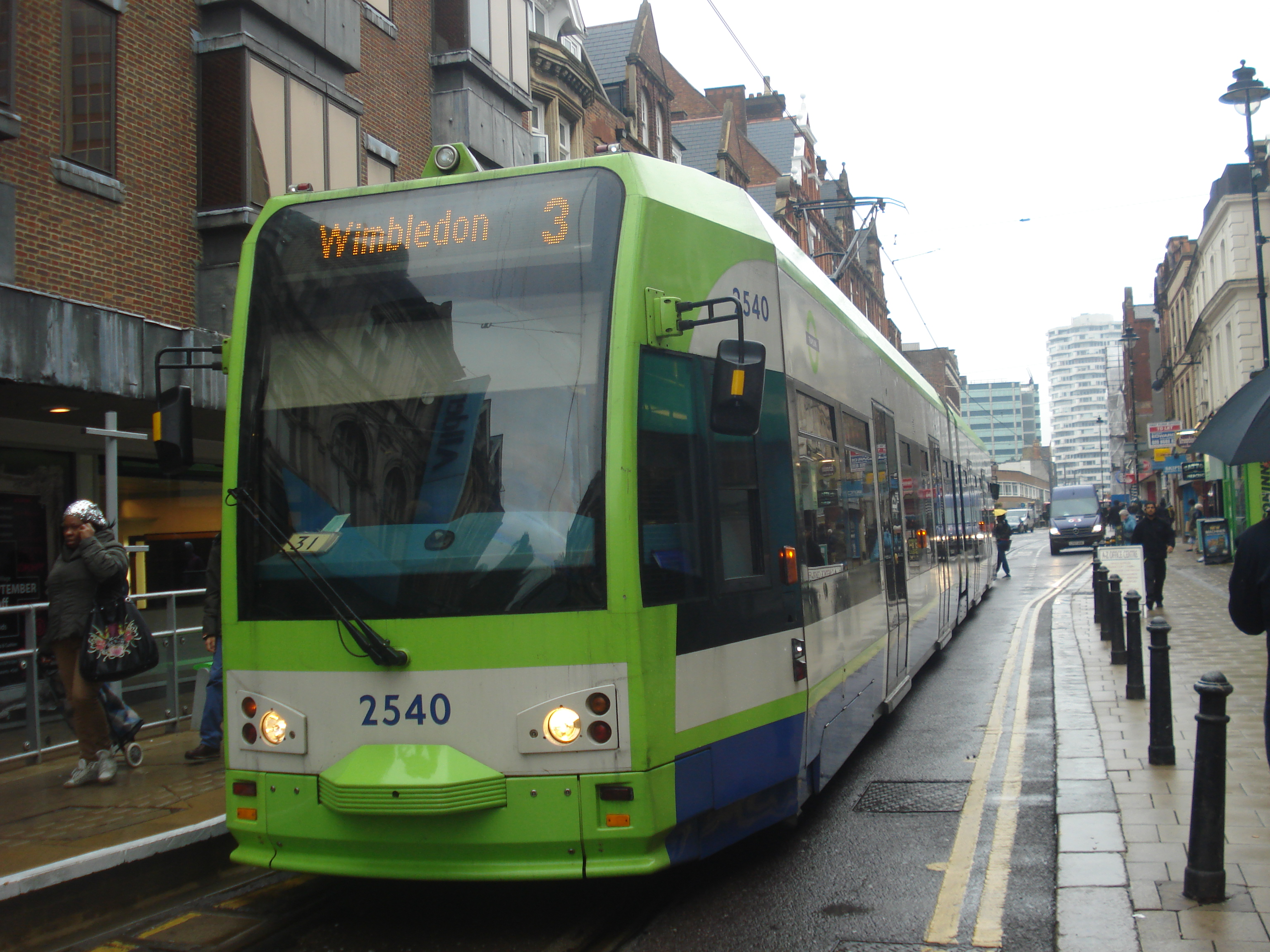
A Tramlink tram on George Street, Croydon in 2013

The key available trends in recent years for Tramlink are (years ending 31 March):

	2014	2015	2016	2017	2018	2019	2020	2021
Passenger revenue (Note: As defined in the DfT Light Rail and Tram Survey (Table LRT0301a)) (£M)	23.5	24.4	22.8	25.5	24.1	23.5	22.7	11.5
'Profit' ("Financial assistance given") (Note: Financial assistance given to Tramtrack Croydon Ltd, as defined in TfL's Annual Report and Statement of Accounts) (£M)		−32.2	−45.1	−22.4	−28.7	−29.7	−39.1	−37.6
Number of passengers (Note: Number of passenger journeys, as defined in TfL's Quarterly performance reports) (M)	31.2	30.7	27.0	29.5	29.1	28.7	27.2	11.6
Customer satisfaction (score)	89	89	90	87	91	90	TBC	TBC
Number of trams (at year end)	30	30	34	36	35	35	35	35
Notes/sources								

Activities in the financial year 2020/21 were severely reduced by the impact of the coronavirus pandemic.

=== Passenger numbers ===
Detailed passenger journeys since Tramlink commenced operations in May 2000 were:

Estimated passenger journeys (millions) made on Tramlink per financial year
Year	Passenger journeys	Year	Passenger journeys	Year	Passenger journeys	Year	Passenger journeys
2000–01	15.0	2007–08	27.2	2014–15	30.7	2021-22	19.1
2001–02	18.2	2008–09	27.2	2015–16	27.0	2022-23	20.9
2002–03	18.7	2009–10	25.8	2016–17	29.5	2023-24	20.0
2003–04	19.8	2010–11	27.9	2017–18	29.1	2024–25	17.2
2004–05	22.0	2011–12	28.6	2018–19	28.7		
2005–06	22.5	2012–13	30.1	2019–20	27.2		
2006–07	24.6	2013–14	31.2	2020–21	11.6		
Estimates from the Department for Transport

== Proposals for extensions ==
Numerous extensions to the network have been discussed or proposed over the years, involving varying degrees of support and investigative effort.

During 2002, as part of The Mayor's Transport Strategy for London, a number of proposed extensions were identified, including to Sutton from Wimbledon or Mitcham; to Crystal Palace; to Colliers Wood/Tooting; and along the A23. The Strategy said that "extensions to the network could, in principle, be developed at relatively modest cost where there is potential demand..." and sought initial views on the viability of a number of extensions by summer 2002.

In 2006, in a TfL consultation on an extension to Crystal Palace, three options were presented: on-street, off-street and a mixture of the two. After the consultation, the off-street option was favoured, to include Crystal Palace Station and Crystal Palace Parade. TfL stated in 2008 that due to lack of funding the plans for this extension would not be taken forward. They were revived shortly after Boris Johnson's re-election as Mayor in May 2012, but six months later they were cancelled again.

During November 2014, a 15-year plan, Trams 2030, called for upgrades to increase capacity on the network in line with an expected increase in ridership to 60 million passengers by 2031 (although the passenger numbers at the time (2013/14: 31.2 million) have not been exceeded since (as at 2019)). The upgrades were to improve reliability, support regeneration in the Croydon metropolitan centre, and future-proof the network for Crossrail 2, a potential Bakerloo line extension, and extensions to the tram network itself to a wide variety of destinations. The plans involve dual-tracking across the network and introducing diverting loops on either side of Croydon, allowing for a higher frequency of trams on all four branches without increasing congestion in central Croydon. The £737 million investment was to be funded by the Croydon Growth Zone, TfL Business Plan, housing levies, and the respective boroughs, and by the affected developers.

All the various developments, if implemented, could theoretically require an increase in the fleet from 30 to up to 80 trams (depending on whether longer trams or coupled trams are used). As such, an increase in depot and stabling capacity would also be required; enlargement of the current Therapia Lane site, as well as sites near the Elmers End and Harrington Road tram stops, were shortlisted.

=== Sutton Link ===
During July 2013, then Mayor Boris Johnson had affirmed that there was a reasonable business case for Tramlink to cover the Wimbledon – Sutton corridor, which might also include a loop via St Helier Hospital and an extension to The Royal Marsden Hospital. In 2014, a proposed £320M scheme for a new line to connect Wimbledon to Sutton via Morden was made and brought to consultation jointly by the London Boroughs of Merton and Sutton. Although £100M from TfL was initially secured in the draft 2016/17 budget, this was subsequently reallocated.

In 2018, TfL opened a consultation on proposals for a connection to Sutton, with three route options: from South Wimbledon, from Colliers Wood (both having an option of a bus rapid transit route or a tram line) or from Wimbledon (only as a tram line). During February 2020, following the consultation, TfL announced their preference for a north–south tramway between Colliers Wood and Sutton town centre, with a projected cost of £425M, on the condition of securing additional funding. Work on the project stopped in July 2020, as Transport for London could not find sufficient funding for it to continue.

In February 2020, TfL announced the preferred route of the extension, expressing their support for "Route Option 2 (Colliers Wood – Sutton) operated as a tram service ... assuming we are successful in securing funding to deliver the project".,

On 24 July 2020, the project was temporarily put on hold due to the COVID-19 pandemic. TfL said they were pausing development work on the scheme "as the transport case is poor and there remains a significant funding gap". Andy Byford, London's Transport Commissioner, said that this involves making 'difficult choices' about which projects can be funded.

During 2023, Sutton's council leader Ruth Dombey advocated for the project and urged TfL and the mayor's office to provide fair and adequate funding, especially in light of the ULEZ charge. However, London Mayor Sadiq Khan dismissed the project as inadequate and pointed out the £440M funding shortfall. London Mayor Sadiq Khan faced criticism from Sutton MP Paul Scully on 21 April 2023, for the delayed Sutton tram extension project and implementing the Ultra Low Emission Zone charge without sufficient public transport alternatives, while defending the delay citing a £440M funding gap. In December 2023, TfL stated that further progress will depend on funding agreements with other stakeholders such as local councils, the Department for Transport, as well as Government, and that the Sutton Link is currently the only extension being considered. Rival proposals included new bus routes.

== Accidents and incidents ==
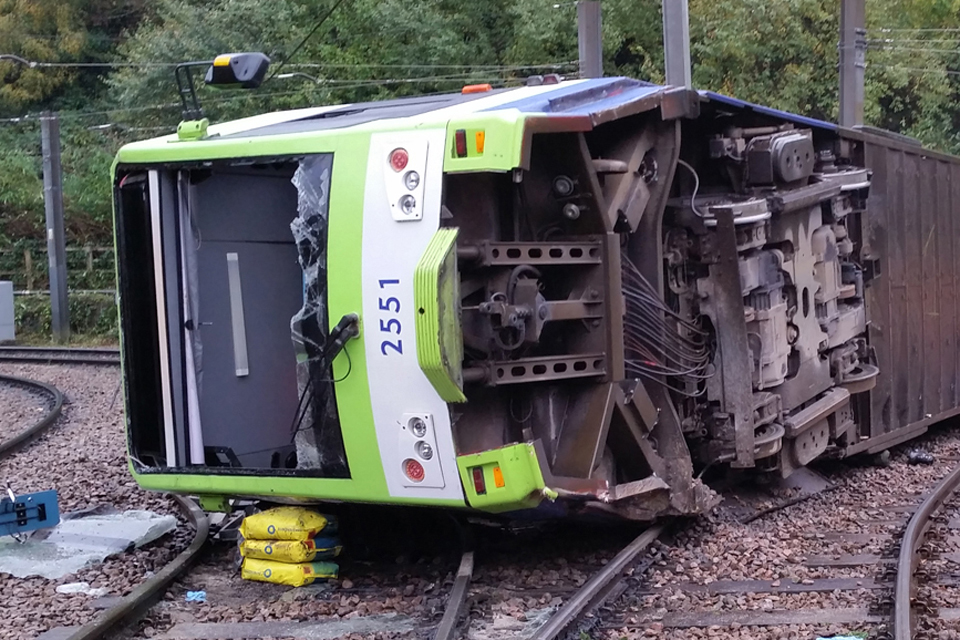
Sandilands, November 2016.

- On 7 September 2008, a bus on route 468 travelled through a red traffic signal and collided with tram 2534 in George Street, Croydon, causing a fatality. The driver of the bus was convicted of causing death by dangerous driving a year later in December 2009 and was sentenced to four years in prison.
- On 13 September 2008, tram 2530 collided with a cyclist at Morden Hall Park footpath crossing between the Morden Road and Phipps Bridge tram stops. The cyclist sustained serious injuries and later died. The immediate cause of the accident was found to be that the cyclist rode onto the crossing without looking at the approaching tram; among the causal factors were that the cyclist may have been wearing headphones, which prevented him hearing the audible warnings.
- On 5 April 2011, a woman tripped over and was dragged under a moving tram. She was taken to hospital in a serious condition. She is believed to have been running to catch the tram outside East Croydon station when she tripped and fell.
- On 17 February 2012, a tram derailed after passing over facing points as it approached the platform at East Croydon station.
- On 7 February 2016, five people were injured when a car collided with tram 2535, which was going round a bend near Wellesley Road. It resulted in the tram being derailed.
- On 9 November 2016, tram 2551 derailed on a sharp curved junction 180 metres (590 ft) east from the Sandilands tram stop, killing seven people and injuring at least 50 more. The British Transport Police arrested the driver on suspicion of manslaughter. Driver error was found to be the cause of the accident, with suspicions that the driver had a microsleep episode approaching the bend. The driver was charged under the Health and Safety at Work etc. Act 1974, but was acquitted by a jury following a trial at the Old Bailey.

== See also ==
- List of modern tramway and light rail systems in the United Kingdom
- List of town tramway systems in the United Kingdom
