= Beckenham Junction station =

National Rail station and Tramlink tram stop in London, England

Beckenham Junction
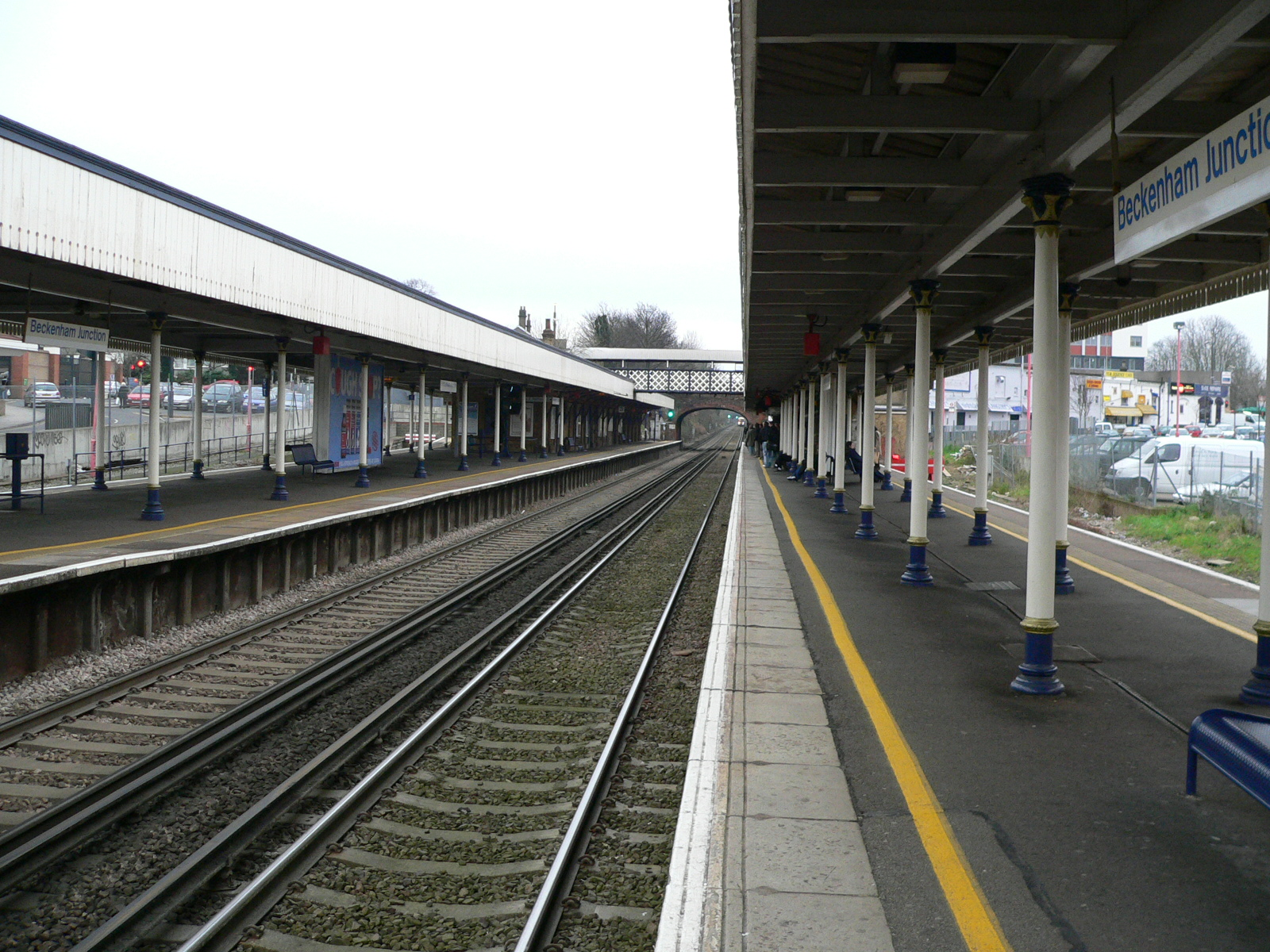
- Interactive map of Beckenham Junction

General information
- Location: Beckenham
- Local authority: London Borough of Bromley
- Managed by: Southeastern
- Station code: BKJ
- DfT category: C2
- Number of platforms: 4 plus 2 Tramlink
- Accessible: Yes
- Fare zone: 4

National Rail annual entry and exit
- 2020–21: ▼0.558 million
- Interchange: ▼22,770
- 2021–22: ▲1.274 million
- Interchange: ▲42,794
- 2022–23: ▲1.451 million
- Interchange: ▼35,852
- 2023–24: ▲1.633 million
- Interchange: ▼33,077
- 2024–25: ▲1.694 million
- Interchange: ▲65,489

Key dates
- 1 January 1857: Opened as a terminus
- 3 May 1858: Became a through-station
- 23 May 2000: Tramlink opened

Other information
- External links: Departures; Facilities
- Coordinates: 51.4109°N 0.0257°W

Beckenham Junction is the main railway and tram station in Beckenham in the London Borough of Bromley, south London. The railway stop is on the Chatham Main Line, 8 miles 53 chains (13.9 km) down the line from London Victoria and situated between Kent House and Shortlands. The tram stop is one of the eastern termini of Tramlink.

For train journeys, Beckenham Junction is in London fare zone 4. Most trains that call are operated by Southeastern, but some Southern services also call.

== Facilities ==
The station has a car park with 88 spaces, and is usually staffed during operating hours. The station also has a small convenience store, coffee kiosk and toilets, which are only available during staffing hours.

== Platforms ==
Beckenham Junction has a total of 4 platforms (+ 2 for tramlink)

Platform 1

- Platform 1 is a terminating bay platform and is used for Southern services from London Bridge via Tulse Hill and Crystal Palace.

Platforms 2 & 3

- Platform 2 is used for Southeastern services to London Victoria via Herne Hill & Brixton. Platform 3 is for Southeastern services to Orpington via Bromley South. Fast trains to and from London Victoria (Chatham side) also pass these platforms.

Platform 4

- This platform is another terminating bay linked with the spur to the Mid-Kent Line, and is occasionally used during engineering or other disruption.

Tramlink Platforms

- There are 2 Croydon Tramlink platforms outside the station. They are both used for trams to and from Wimbledon via East Croydon, which terminate here.

== Services ==
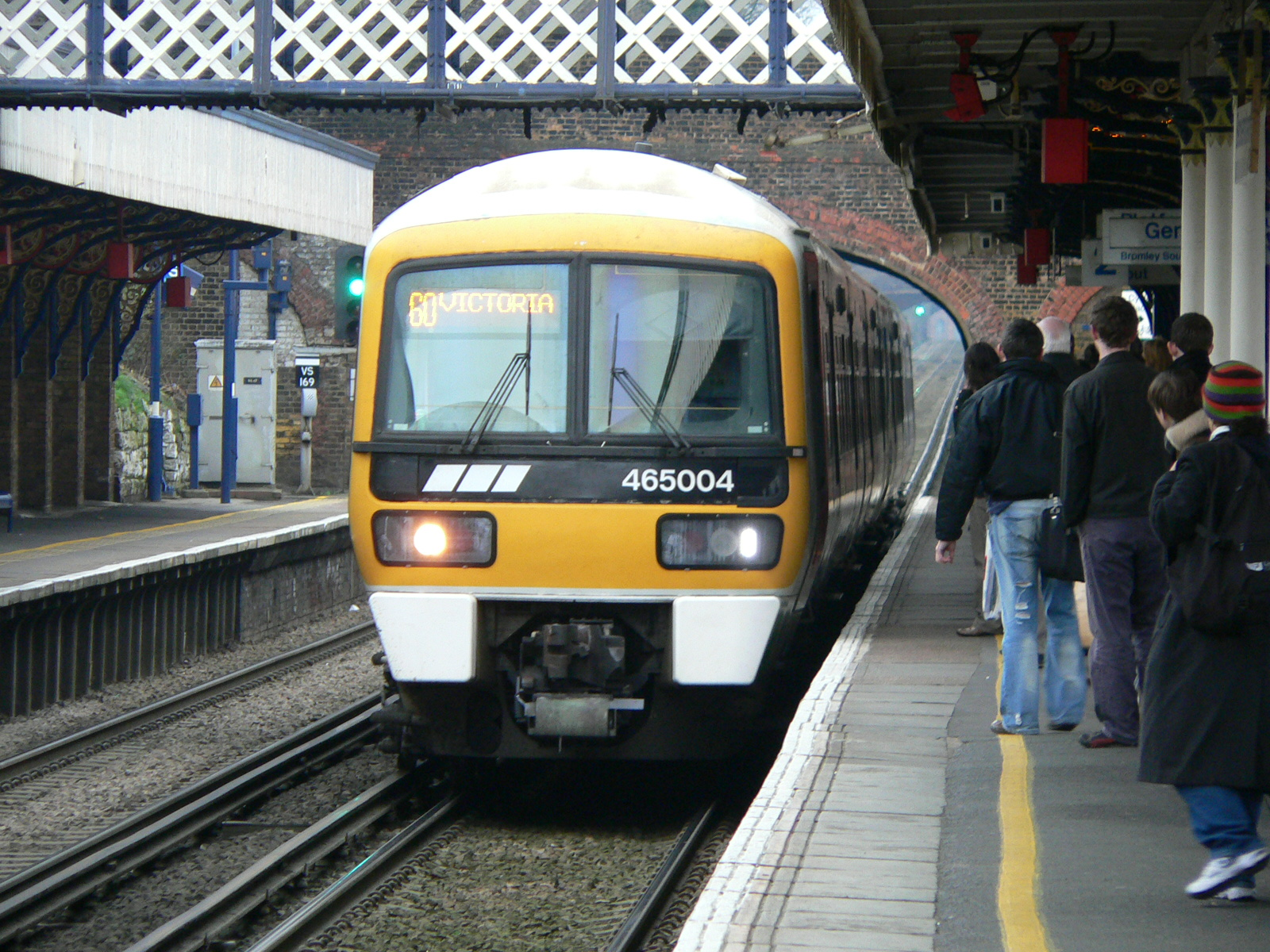
Class 465 Networker at Beckenham Junction in 2006

=== National Rail ===
National Rail services at Beckenham Junction are operated by Southeastern and Southern using Class 377, 465 and 466 EMUs.

The typical off-peak service in trains per hour is:

- 4 tph to London Victoria via Herne Hill
- 2 tph to London Bridge via Crystal Palace
- 4 tph to Orpington via Bromley South

Additional services, including trains to and from London Blackfriars call at the station during the peak hours.

On weekends, the services between London Victoria and Orpington are reduced to two trains per hour and on Sundays, the services to and from London Bridge do not run.

=== London Trams ===
Tram services at Beckenham Junction are operated by Tramlink. The tram stop is served by trams every 10 minutes to Wimbledon via Croydon. This is reduced to a tram every 15 minutes during late Monday to Saturday evenings and Sundays.

Services are operated using Bombardier CR4000 and Stadler Variobahn model low-floor trams.

Preceding station	National Rail	Following station
Kent House	Southeastern Bromley South Line	Shortlands
Birkbeck	Southern Crystal Palace Line Monday-Saturday only	Terminus
Preceding station	Tramlink	Following station
Beckenham Road towards Wimbledon	Tramlink Wimbledon to Beckenham Junction	Terminus

== Connections ==
London Buses routes 54, 162 and 354 serve the station.

== History ==
=== National Rail ===
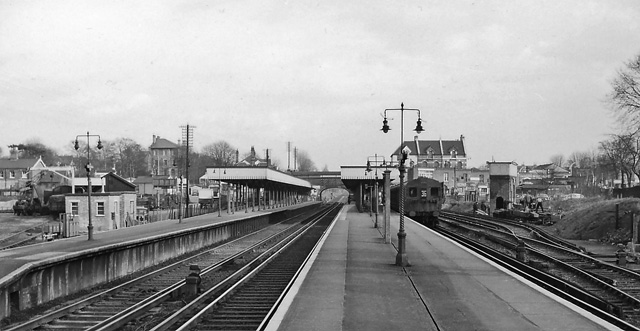
Beckenham Junction Station in 1961

The station was opened by the Mid-Kent Railway (MKR) on 1 January 1857 as the terminus of the line from Lewisham; it became a junction on 3 May 1858 when the West End of London and Crystal Palace Railway Farnborough Extension line from Crystal Palace to Shortlands was opened. On 1 July 1863 the London Chatham & Dover Railway Metropolitan Extension from Beckenham to Victoria/Blackfriars completed the lines serving the station. In 1863 the MKR was taken over by the South Eastern Railway (SER) and thereafter the station was operated jointly by the LCDR and SER. Despite a partial rebuilding in 1890 the original MKR building is still in use as the main station offices and booking hall.

From December 2007, a significant upgrade to train services at Beckenham Junction took place, with an increase in frequency of the London Victoria to Orpington services (off peak) to every 15 mins. Until Section 2 of High Speed 1 opened in 2007 Eurostar services passed the station, but did not stop. In December 2010 Southern increased the number of evening services on Monday-Saturdays so that trains would run to London Bridge Station later into the evening.

=== Tramlink ===
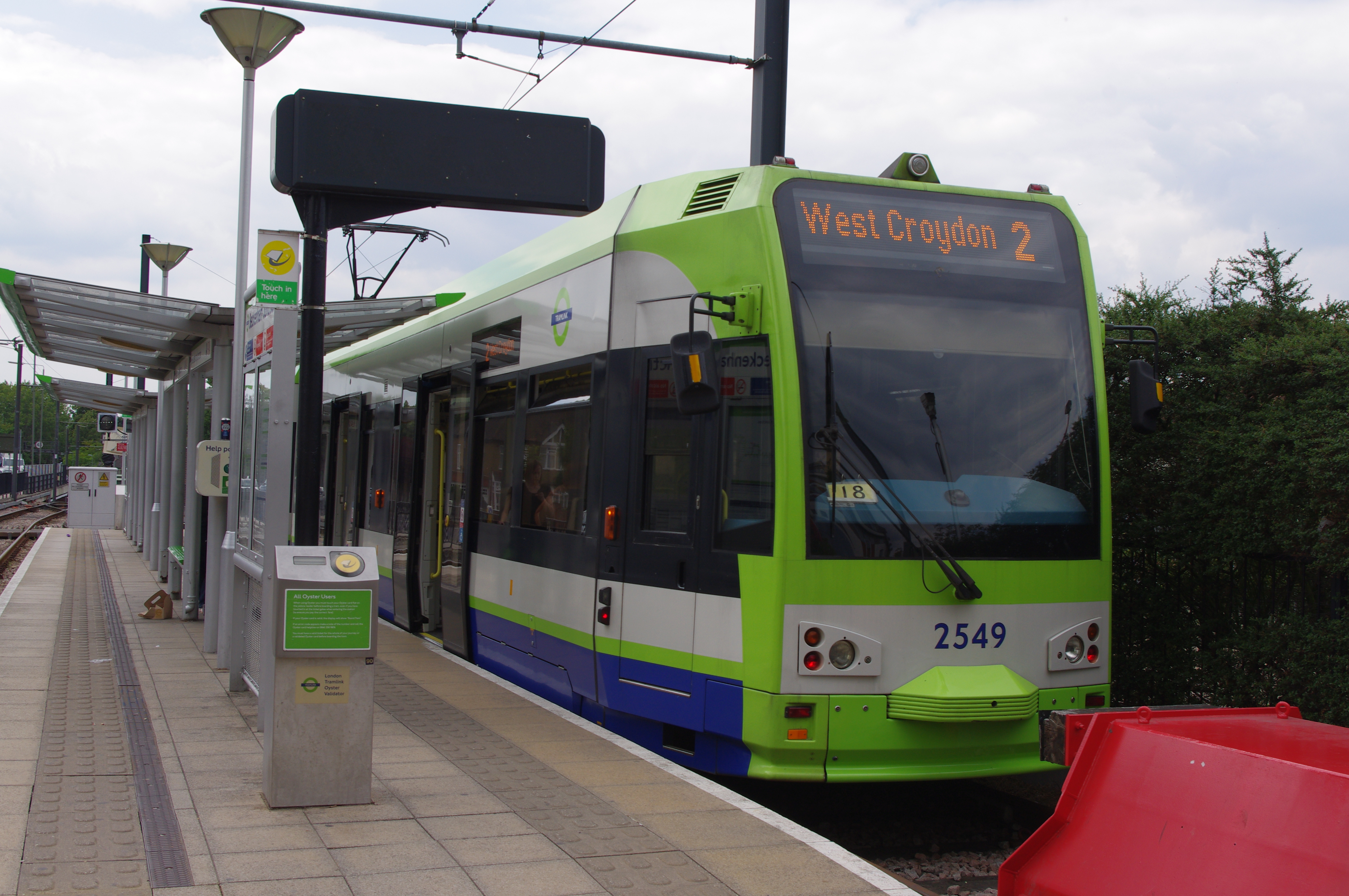
Tram 2549 at the Beckenham Junction terminus of Tramlink.

The two platform Tramlink stop opened in 2000, with the rest of the route to the Croydon loop. The stop is outside the station, across the car park, beside the A2015 road, which avoids Beckenham town centre.

=== Accidents and incidents ===
- On 22 January 1990, 4EPB electric multiple unit 5408 collided with the buffer stop on arrival from London Bridge and was derailed.
