= CSB =

CSB or csb can refer to:

== Organisations ==
- Civil Service Bureau of Hong Kong
- CSB Bank an Indian Bank based out of Thrissur, Kerala formerly known as Catholic Syrian Bank
- Canadian Society for Biomechanics
- Congregation of St. Basil
- Christian Service Brigade, a non-denominational Christian organization for men and boys in the United States and Canada.
- Crime Scene Boyz, a rap collective from Harlesden, London.
- Garda Crime and Security Branch (CSB), the national intelligence agency of the Garda Síochána, Ireland's police force
- Chitrapur Saraswat Brahmin
- U.S. Chemical Safety and Hazard Investigation Board
- Confédération Syndicale Burkinabé, the Trade Union Confederation of Burkina
- Trade Union Confederation of Burundi (Confédération Syndicale du Burundi), a trade union confederation in Burundi
- 21 Air (ICAO:CSB), an American cargo airline from the United States based in Greensboro, North Carolina

=== Schools ===
- Cambridge School of Bucharest in Romania
- Cree School Board, a school district in northern Quebec, Canada
- Connecticut School of Broadcasting, an American education institute.
- Christian Science Board of Lectureship, a teacher of Christian Science Church
- Cercle Sportif Brugeois, an old name of Cercle Brugge
- Central School of Ballet
- Cathedral School for Boys in San Francisco
- College of Saint Benedict and Saint John's University
- Colegio San Benito in Puerto Rico
- De La Salle–College of Saint Benilde, of Manila

== People ==
- Chen Shui-bian, the former president of Taiwan
- Carlos Salvador Bilardo, football coach from Argentina

== Science, mathematics, and technology ==
- Client Side Blazor, .NET Code execution on browser side via WebAssembly
- An alias for ERCC6, a gene involved in Cockayne syndrome
- Collection of Computer Science Bibliographies
- Compressed soil block (compressed earth block), a building material
- Csb: warm-summer Mediterranean climate, under Köppen climate classification

== Scriptural translations ==
- Chinese Study Bible, a study Bible adapted from the ESV Study Bible
- Christian Standard Bible, a translation of the Bible in contemporary English

== Other ==
- California Shuttle Bus a passenger service between the San Francisco Bay Area and the Los Angeles area
- Canada Savings Bond
- Carshalton Beeches railway station (National Rail station code CSB), England, UK
- Kashubian language (ISO 639-2 and 639-3 alpha-3 code csb)

== See also ==
- CSBS
