= CSBS =

CSBS may refer to:

- Canadian Society of Biblical Studies
- Course Setting Bomb Sight
- CSUSB College of Social and Behavioral Sciences, California State University - San Bernardino, USA
- Czechoslovak Badminton Association (Czech: Československý Badmintonový Svaz), the national sports authority sanctioning the Czechoslovakia national badminton team
- Filamin-A, a protein
- Cloud Server Backup Service, offered by Bangladesh Computer Council
- Concordia Student Broadcasting Society, that runs Concordia University Television
- Conference of State Bank Supervisors, in the United States; see List of financial supervisory authorities by country

== See also ==
- CSB (disambiguation)
