= Waddon railway station =

National Rail station in London, England

Waddon
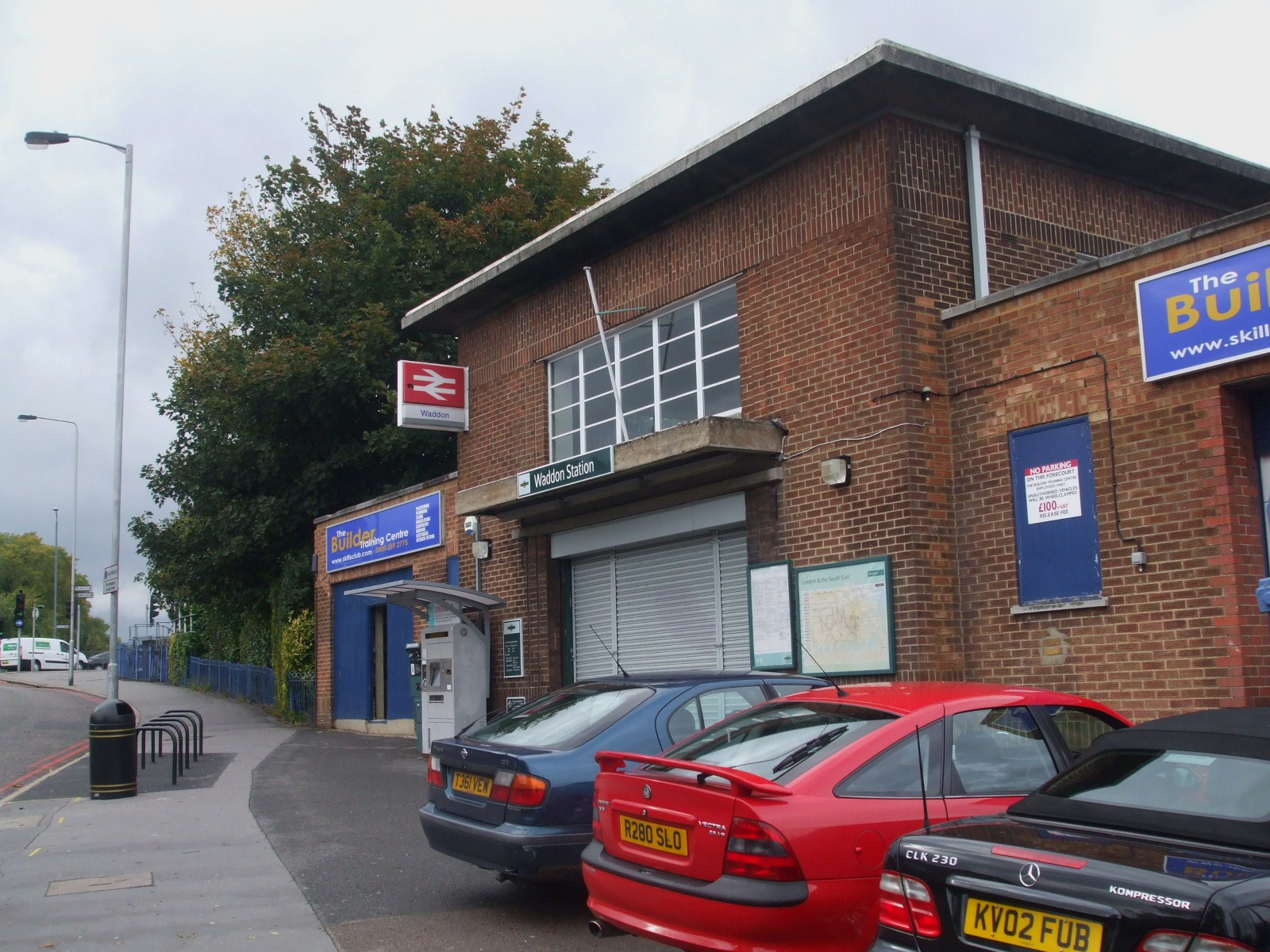
- Interactive map of Waddon

General information
- Location: Waddon
- Local authority: London Borough of Croydon
- Managed by: Southern
- Station code: WDO
- DfT category: D
- Number of platforms: 2
- Fare zone: 5

National Rail annual entry and exit
- 2020–21: ▼0.212 million
- 2021–22: ▲0.400 million
- 2022–23: ▲0.484 million
- 2023–24: ▲0.522 million
- 2024–25: ▲0.605 million

Railway companies
- Original company: London, Brighton & South Coast Railway
- Pre-grouping: London, Brighton & South Coast Railway
- Post-grouping: Southern Railway

Key dates
- February 1863: Opened

Other information
- External links: Departures; Facilities
- Coordinates: 51.3674°N 0.117°W

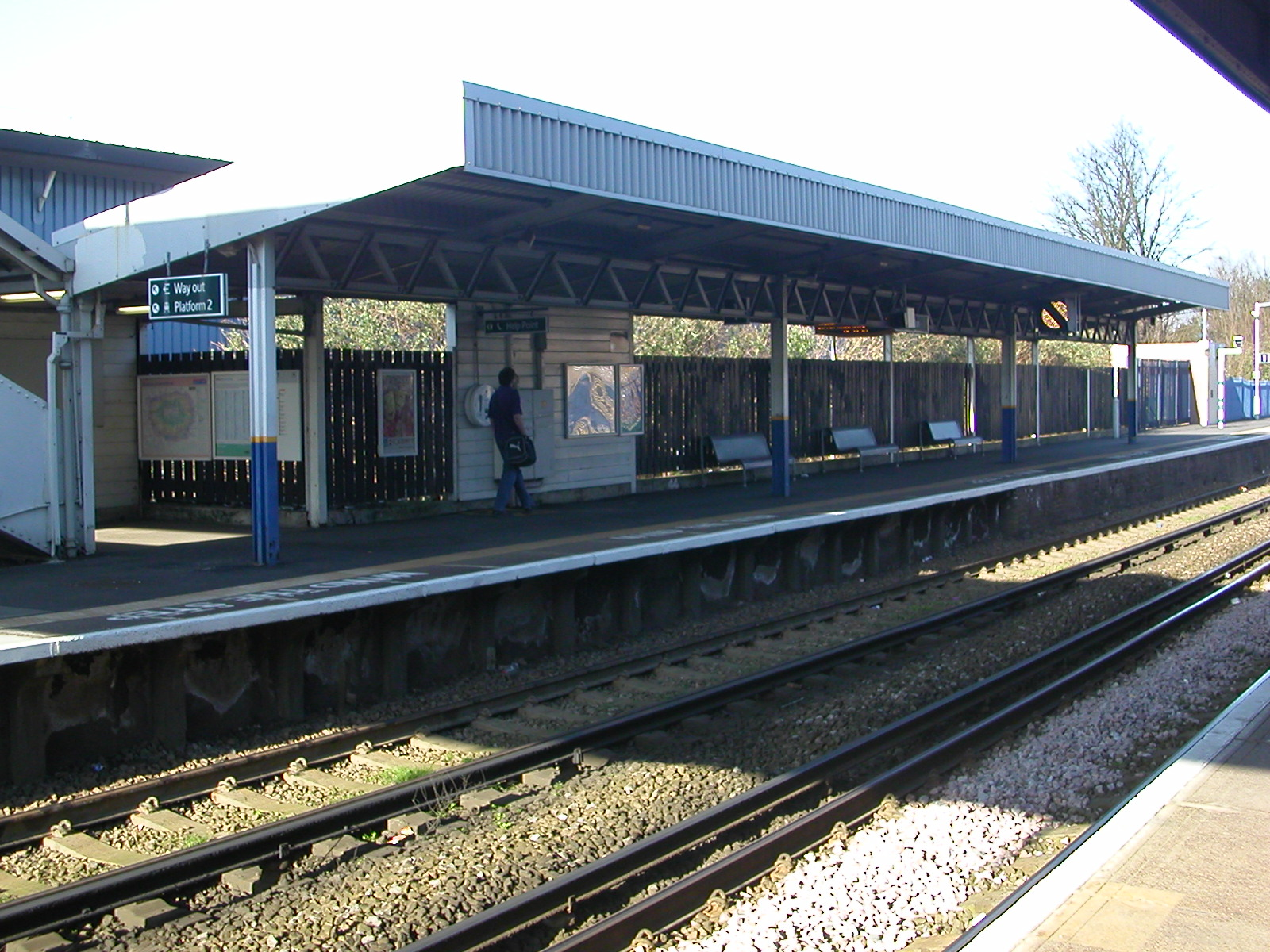
View of the eastbound platform

Waddon railway station is in the London Borough of Croydon in south London. The station and all trains serving it are operated by Southern. It is in London fare zone 5, between West Croydon and Wallington, and is 11 miles 40 chains (11.50 miles, 18.51 km) down the line from London Bridge measured via Forest Hill.

== Accidents and incidents ==
- On 4 November 1942, two electric multiple units collided due to a signalman's error: two people were killed.

== Services ==
All services at Waddon are operated by Southern using Class 377 EMUs.

The typical off-peak service in trains per hour is:

- 2 tph to London Bridge (non-stop from Norwood Junction)
- 2 tph to London Victoria via Norbury
- 2 tph to Epsom
- 2 tph to Epsom Downs

During the peak hours, the station is served by an additional half-hourly service between London Victoria and Sutton.

Preceding station	National Rail	Following station
West Croydon	Southern Sutton & Mole Valley Lines	Wallington

== Connections ==
London Buses routes 154, 157, 289 and 439 serve the station.
