= CUTV =

CUTV may refer to:

- Coventry University Television, Television Station of Coventry University in Coventry, UK
- Concordia University Television, Television Station of Concordia University in Montreal, Quebec, Canada
- California University Television, Television station of California University of Pennsylvania in California, Pennsylvania
- Cardiff Union TV, Television station of Cardiff University in Cardiff, Wales
