= CSBM =

CSBM may refer to:

- Colegio San Benito
- Confidence and Security Building Measures, implemented by the Vienna Document
