= Wallington railway station =

Railway station in London

Wallington
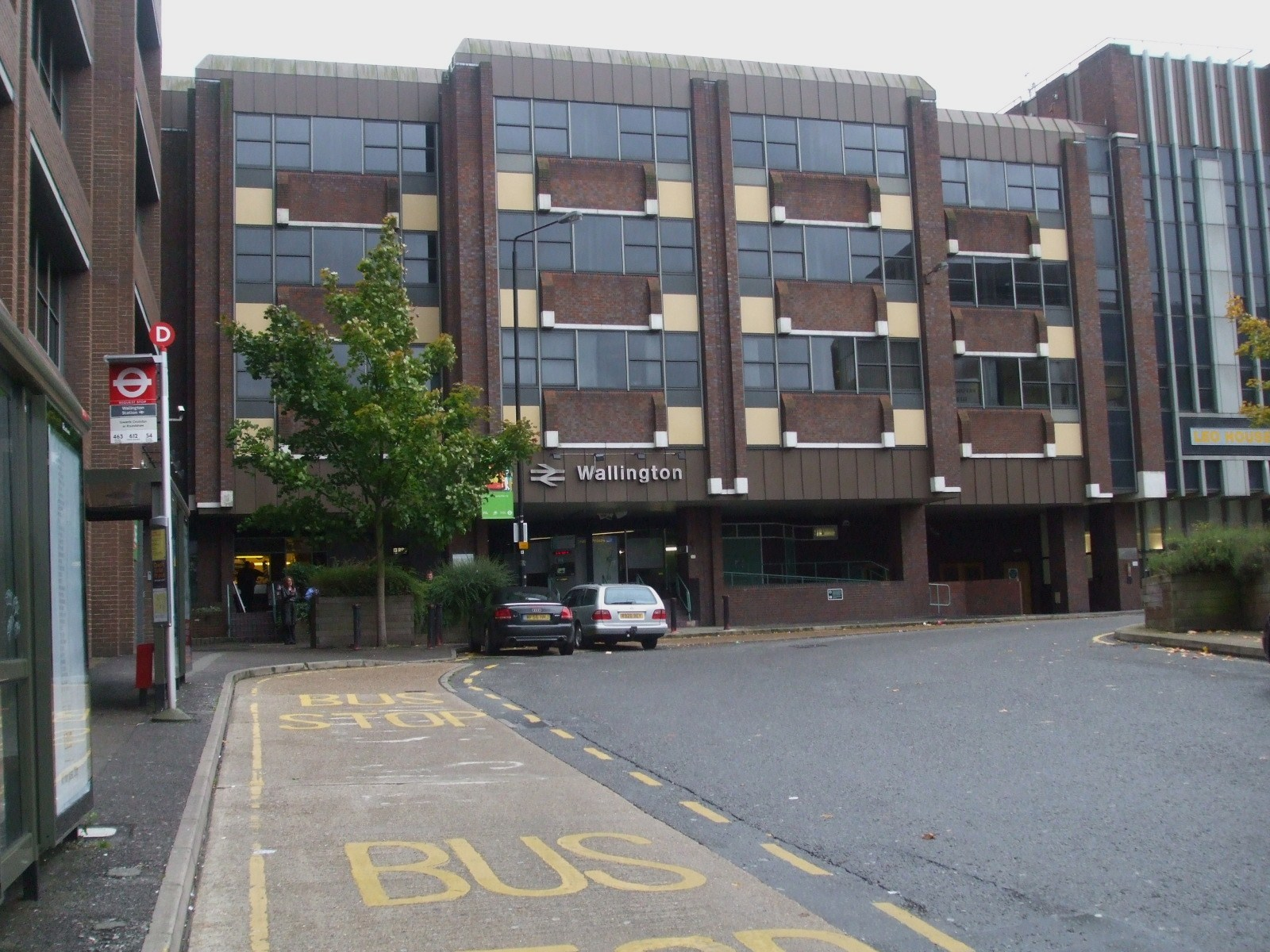
- Interactive map of Wallington

General information
- Location: Wallington
- Local authority: London Borough of Sutton
- Managed by: Southern
- Station code: WLT
- DfT category: C2
- Number of platforms: 2
- Accessible: Yes
- Fare zone: 5

National Rail annual entry and exit
- 2020–21: ▼0.527 million
- 2021–22: ▲1.092 million
- 2022–23: ▲1.318 million
- 2023–24: ▲1.432 million
- 2024–25: ▲1.609 million

Key dates
- 10 May 1847: Opened as Carshalton
- renamed: 1868

Other information
- External links: Departures; Facilities
- Coordinates: 51.3603°N 0.1507°W

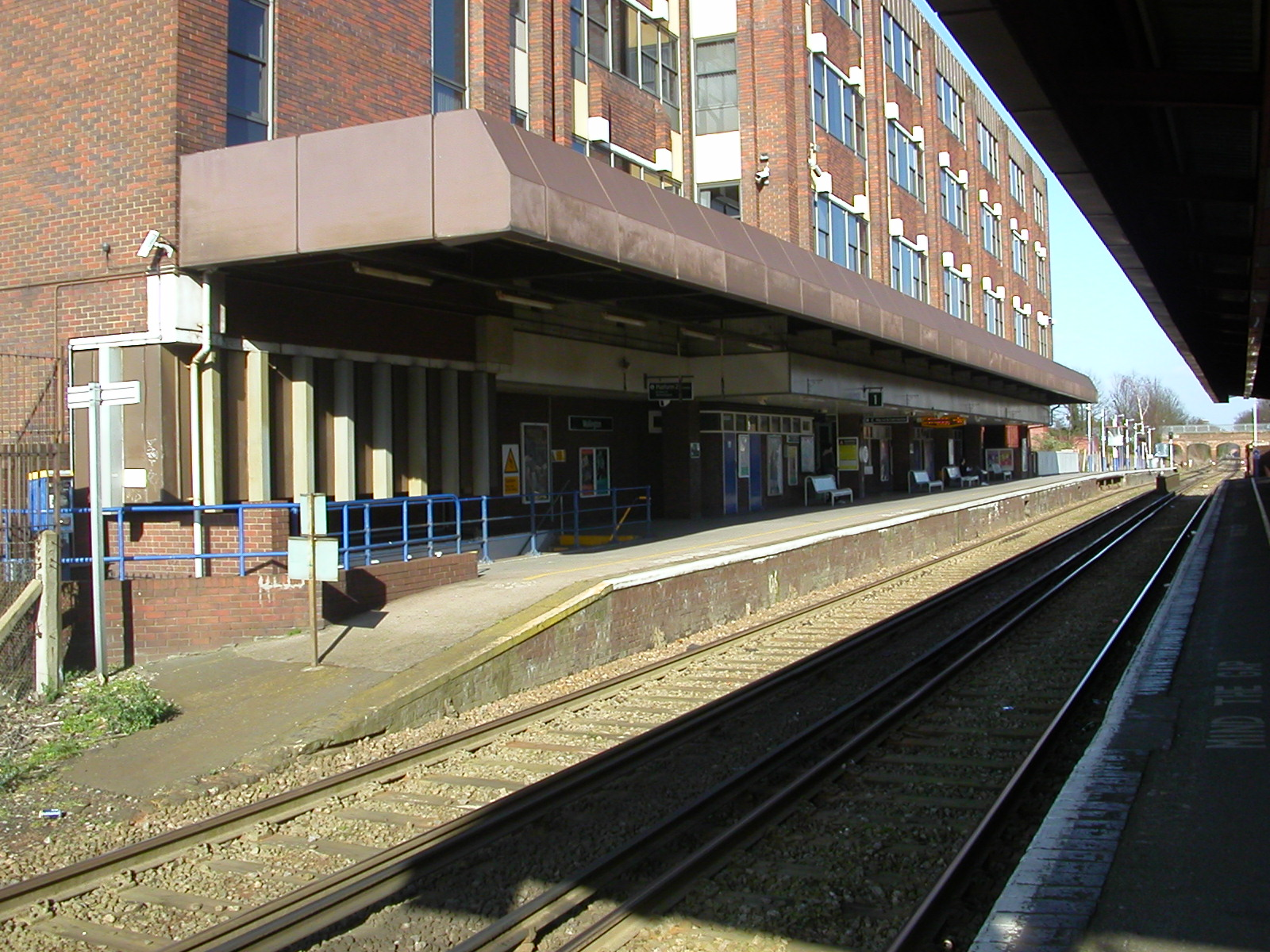
View of the eastbound platform and side entrance.

Wallington railway station is in the London Borough of Sutton in south London. The station, and all trains serving it, is operated by Southern, and is in London fare zone 5. It is between Waddon and Carshalton Beeches, 13 miles 5 chains (13.06 miles, 21.02 km) down the line from London Bridge, measured via Forest Hill.

The station was opened on 10 May 1847 by the London, Brighton and South Coast Railway as 'Carshalton' on the new Croydon to Epsom railway and was renamed to 'Wallington' in 1868 when the new Carshalton railway station opened in Carshalton village. During 2009 some renovations to the station were undertaken, including platform raising.

Ticket barriers are in operation at this station.

== Services ==
All services at Wallington are operated by Southern using Class 377 EMUs.

The typical off-peak service in trains per hour is:

- 2 tph to London Bridge (non-stop from Norwood Junction)
- 2 tph to London Victoria via Norbury
- 2 tph to Epsom
- 2 tph to Epsom Downs

During the peak hours, the station is served by an additional half-hourly service between London Victoria and Sutton.

| Preceding station | National Rail | Following station |
|---|---|---|
| Waddon | Southern Sutton & Mole Valley Lines | Carshalton Beeches |
| | Disused railways | |
| Sutton | Network SouthEast Thameslink | West Croydon |

== Connections ==
London Buses routes 127, 151, 157, 410, 463 and S4, school routes 612 and 627 serve the station. Northbound journeys serve bus stops in the Station Approach road. Most southbound journeys stop on Manor Road opposite the entrance to Station Approach.
