= West Croydon station =

National Rail station, Overground and Tramlink tram stop in London

West Croydon
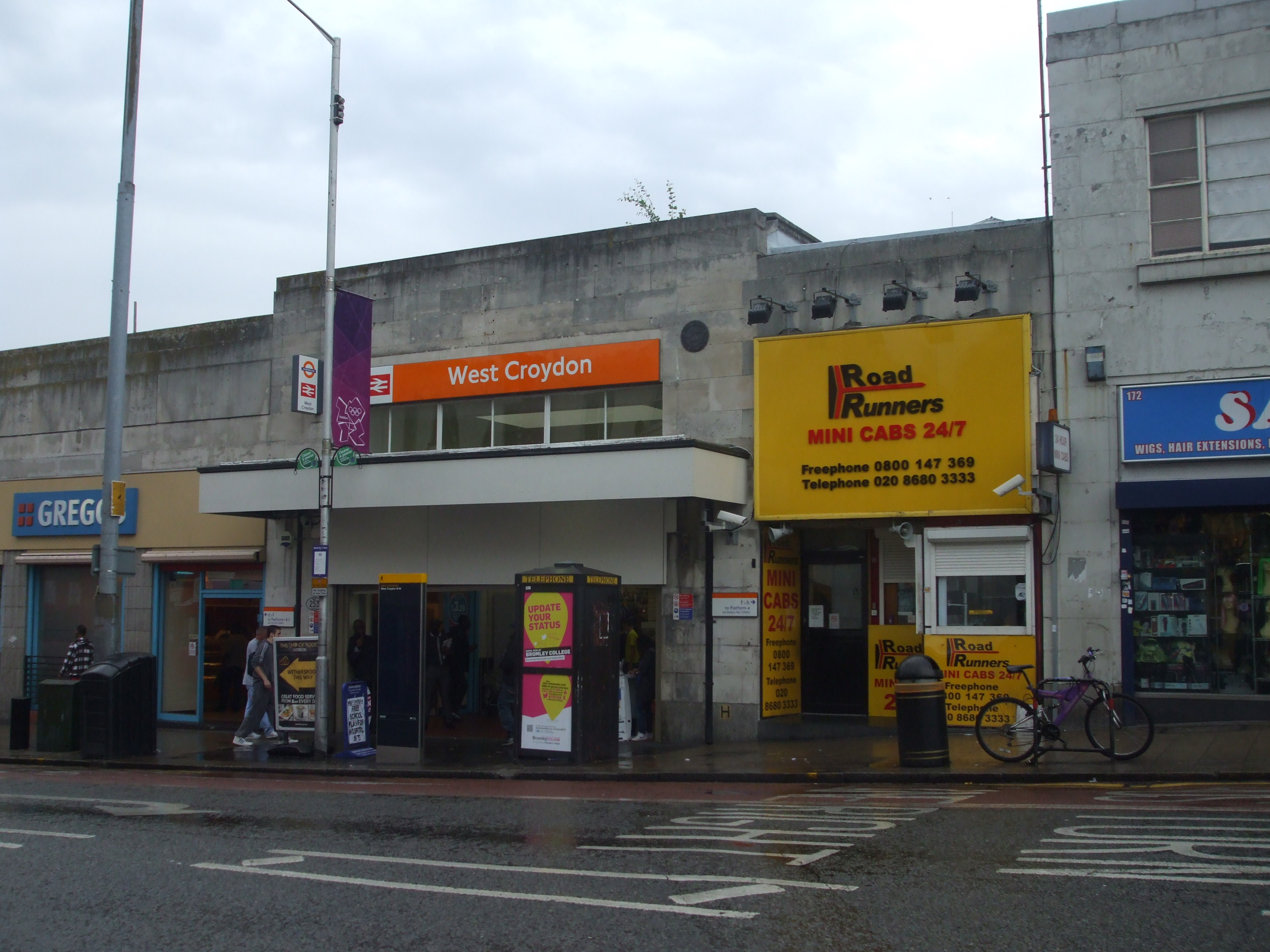
- Interactive map of West Croydon

General information
- Location: Croydon
- Local authority: London Borough of Croydon
- Managed by: London Overground
- Owner: Network Rail
- Station code: WCY
- DfT category: C2
- Number of platforms: 3 (formerly 4)
- Accessible: Yes
- Fare zone: 5

National Rail annual entry and exit
- 2020–21: ▼1.738 million
- Interchange: ▼0.124 million
- 2021–22: ▲3.148 million
- Interchange: ▲0.241 million
- 2022–23: ▲3.692 million
- Interchange: ▲0.257 million
- 2023–24: ▲4.273 million
- Interchange: ▲0.292 million
- 2024–25: ▲4.370 million
- Interchange: ▲0.308 million

Railway companies
- Original company: London and Croydon Railway
- Pre-grouping: London Brighton and South Coast Railway
- Post-grouping: Southern Railway

Key dates
- 5 June 1839: Opened as Croydon
- April 1851: Renamed West Croydon

Other information
- External links: Departures; Facilities
- Coordinates: 51.3782611°N 0.1025444°W

West Croydon is a multi-modal interchange station located in Croydon, South London. It is a southern terminus of the Windrush line of the London Overground, and is also served by National Rail services operated by Southern. The station also includes a tram stop on the London Trams network and a bus station. On the National Rail network it is 10 miles 35 chains (10.44 miles, 16.80 km) measured from London Bridge. It is in London fare zone 5.

== Facilities ==
=== Railway station ===
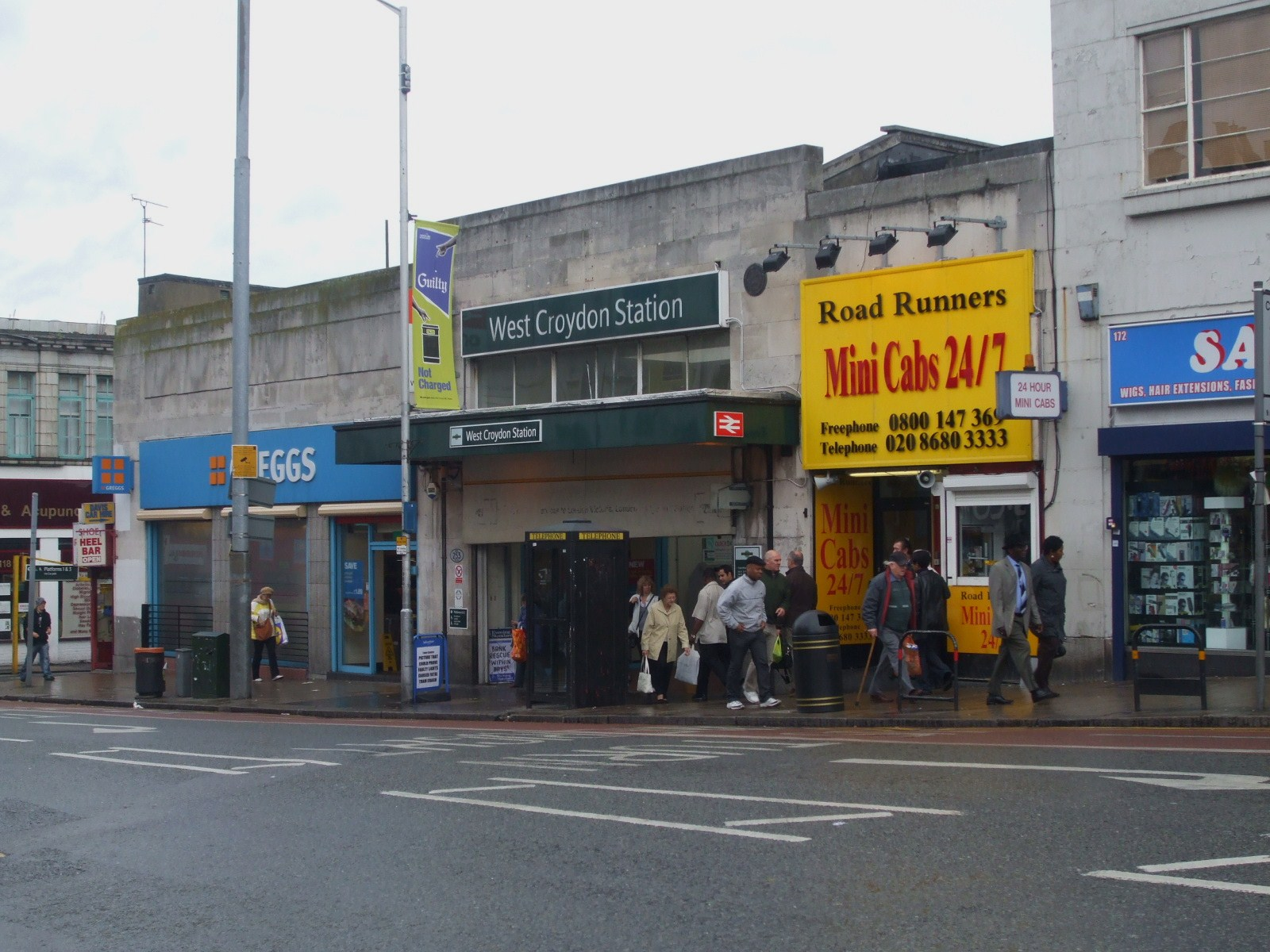
West Croydon (2008 image) with Southern branding

The main entrance is on London Road, a short distance from the main shopping area. There are ticket barriers protecting the platforms. Trains run to London Victoria, London Bridge, Highbury & Islington, and Sutton and from there to west Surrey and West Sussex.

By December 2009 station remodelling and tracklaying were completed for the southern extension of the East London line (now the Windrush line), of which West Croydon is a terminus. The space occupied by former bay platform 2, out of use since the Wimbledon service was withdrawn in 1997 and replaced by Tramlink in 2000, has been utilised to extend platform 3, the London-bound platform. Bay platform 1 has been retained. There is no Platform 2.

In April 2012 a new entrance was constructed in Station Road, allowing direct access to the railway station from the adjacent bus and tram stops.

=== Bus station and tram stop ===
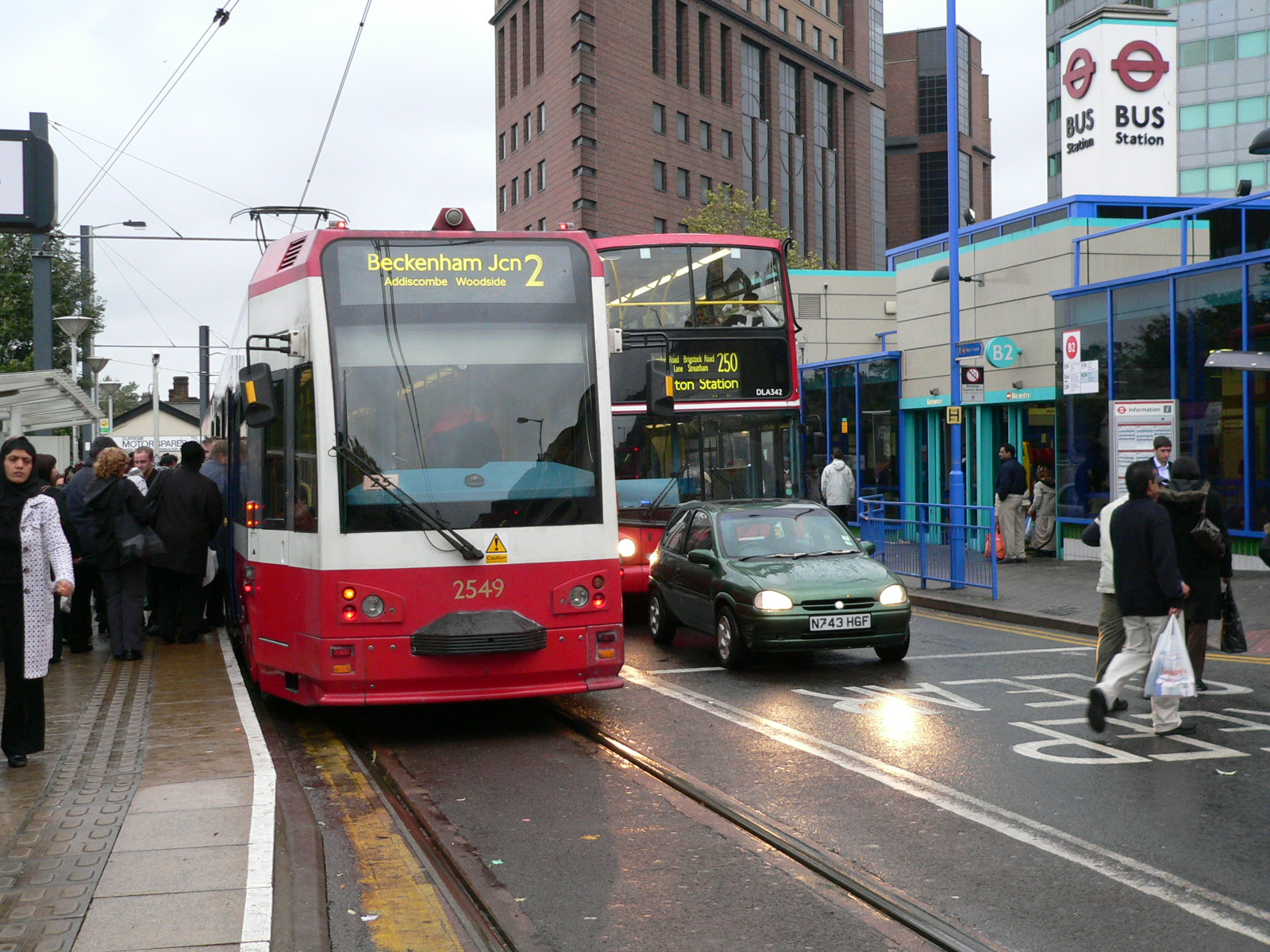
The tram and bus interchange at West Croydon in 2005

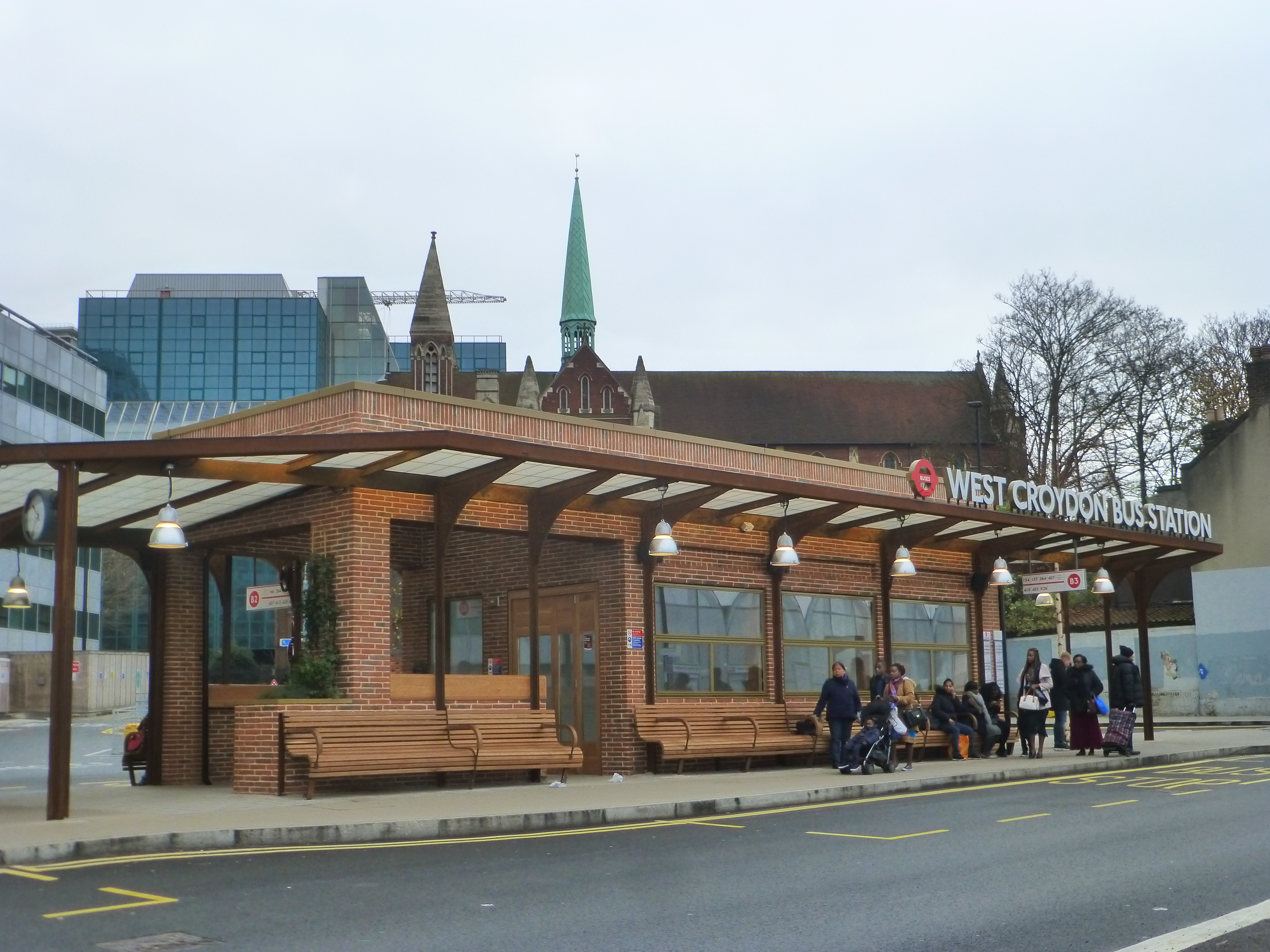
West Croydon Bus Station rebuilt in 2016

A short distance from the main entrance is Station Road, where West Croydon bus station and tram stop are located. The tram stop is next to, but was for a long time physically separate from, the rail platforms, until the construction of the new entrance. All Tramlink routes use West Croydon, which is a single platform stop on the unidirectional loop around central Croydon. The bus station is a hub for London Buses, with 24 bus routes terminating or passing through. A new bus station opened in 2016.

London Buses routes 50, 60, 64, 75, 109, 154, 157, 166, 194, 198, 250, 264, 289, 367, 403, 407, 410, 450 and 468, Superloop routes SL6 and SL7 and night routes N68, N109 and N250 serve the railway and bus stations.

== History ==
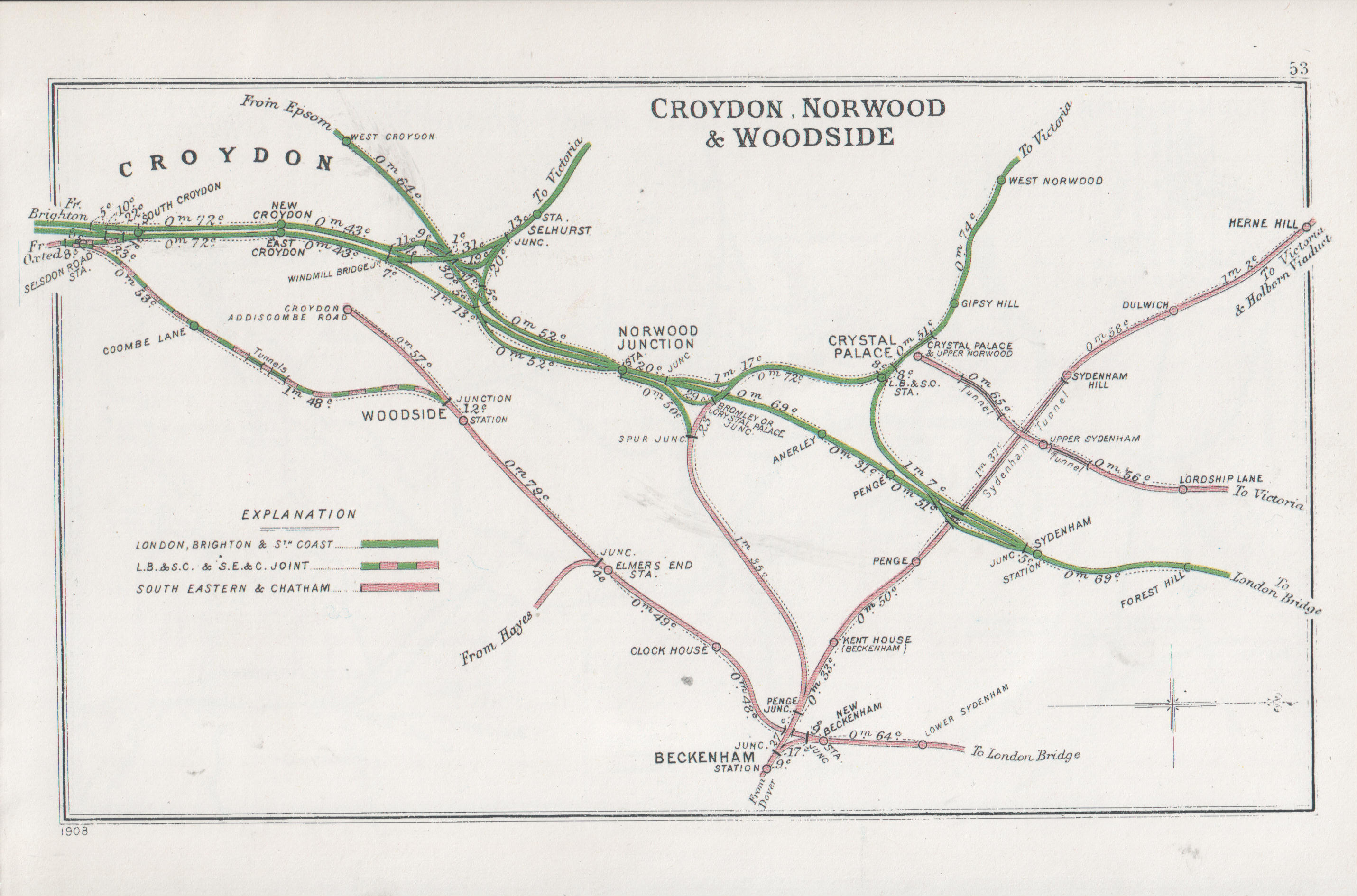
A 1908 Railway Clearing House map of lines around the Brighton Main Line between South Croydon and Selhurst/Forest Hill, and surrounding lines

From 1809 to 1836 the site was the terminal basin of the Croydon Canal. The canal was drained and became part of the route of the London & Croydon Railway, opening on 5 June 1839. In 1845 the L&C inaugurated the atmospheric system of propulsion; it worked for about a year but was not successful. On 23 September 1846, a fire broke out in a lamp room, severely damaging the station and destroying thirteen carriages. Damage was estimated at £10,000. The station was originally named Croydon; in April 1851 it became West Croydon, to distinguish it from East Croydon station. The name is misleading, as the station, and the district now named after it, in fact lie immediately to the north of Croydon town centre.

The canal basin was served by a short private branch from the terminus of the Surrey Iron Railway (SIR) at Pitlake. From 1855 the station was the terminus of the West Croydon to Wimbledon Line, which followed much of the route of the SIR. This line closed on 31 May 1997, to be replaced by Tramlink. Platform 2, the terminal bay for the Wimbledon line, was trackless until 2008. Very little remains of this platform apart from a small section at the western end, for most of it was filled in to extend platform 3 to allow trains to stop closer to the stairs.

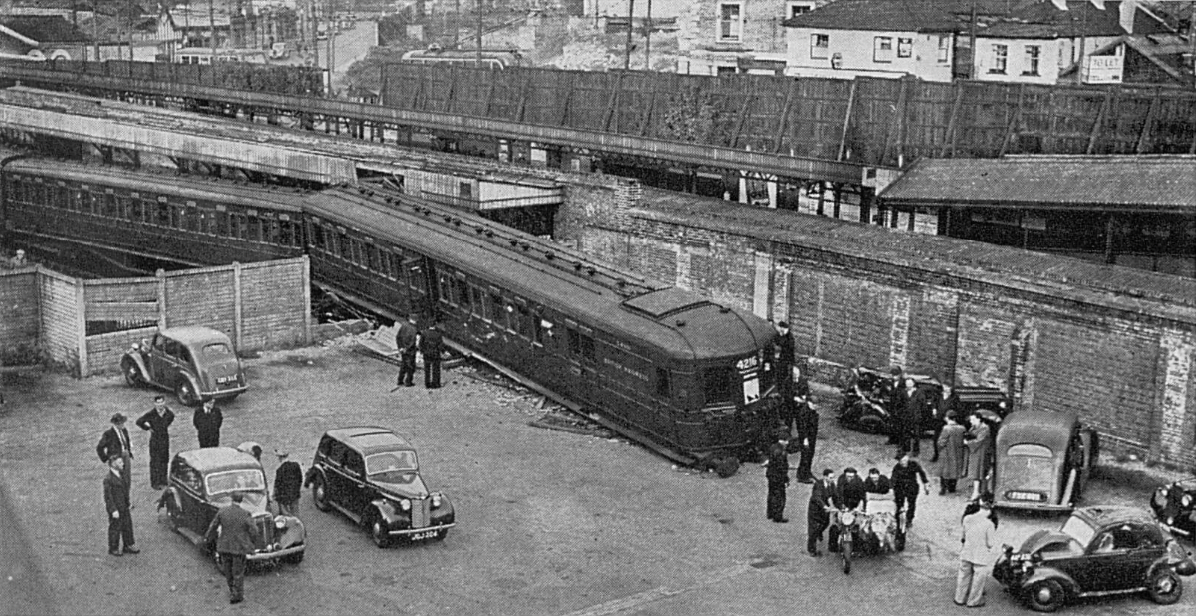
The first four coaches became derailed when an electric train hit the buffers at West Croydon station in October 1948, crashed through a wall and damaged several cars.

In 1912 the composer Samuel Coleridge-Taylor (1875–1912), who was a resident of Croydon, collapsed whilst on the station. This was due to overwork and pneumonia. He died at home a few days later.

During the 1930s the station saw major alterations and reconstruction. A new ticket office was built on London Road. The original station buildings, ticket office and entrance in Station Road were closed but are still standing, converted to a shop.

== Services ==
West Croydon is Croydon's second station, used mainly by suburban trains: the main station is East Croydon, served by express trains to London and the South Coast and suburban trains.

West Croydon is a southern terminus of the Windrush line of the London Overground, with services operated using Class 378 EMUs. Additional services at West Croydon are operated by Southern using Class 377 EMUs.

The typical off-peak service in trains per hour is:

- 2 tph to London Bridge (non-stop from Norwood Junction)
- 4 tph to London Victoria (2 of these run via Norbury and 2 run via Crystal Palace)
- 4 tph to Highbury & Islington via New Cross Gate and Dalston Junction (Windrush line)
- 2 tph to Epsom
- 2 tph to Epsom Downs

During the peak hours, the station is served by an additional half-hourly service between London Victoria and Sutton.

Preceding station	National Rail	Following station
Selhurst	Southern Sutton & Mole Valley Lines	Waddon
Norwood Junction	Southern Sutton & Mole Valley Lines	Waddon
Preceding station	London Overground	Following station
Norwood Junction towards Highbury & Islington	Windrush line East London line	Terminus
Preceding station	Tramlink	Following station
Centrale One-way operation	Tramlink; Wimbledon to Beckenham Junction	Wellesley Road towards Beckenham Junction
Centrale One-way operation	Tramlink; Wimbledon to Elmers End	Wellesley Road towards Elmers End
Centrale One-way operation	Tramlink; New Addington to Croydon town centre	Wellesley Road towards New Addington
Disused railways
Waddon Marsh	Connex South Central West Croydon to Wimbledon Line	Terminus
Wallington	Network SouthEast Thameslink	Norwood Junction
