= Carshalton railway station =

National Rail station in London, England

Carshalton
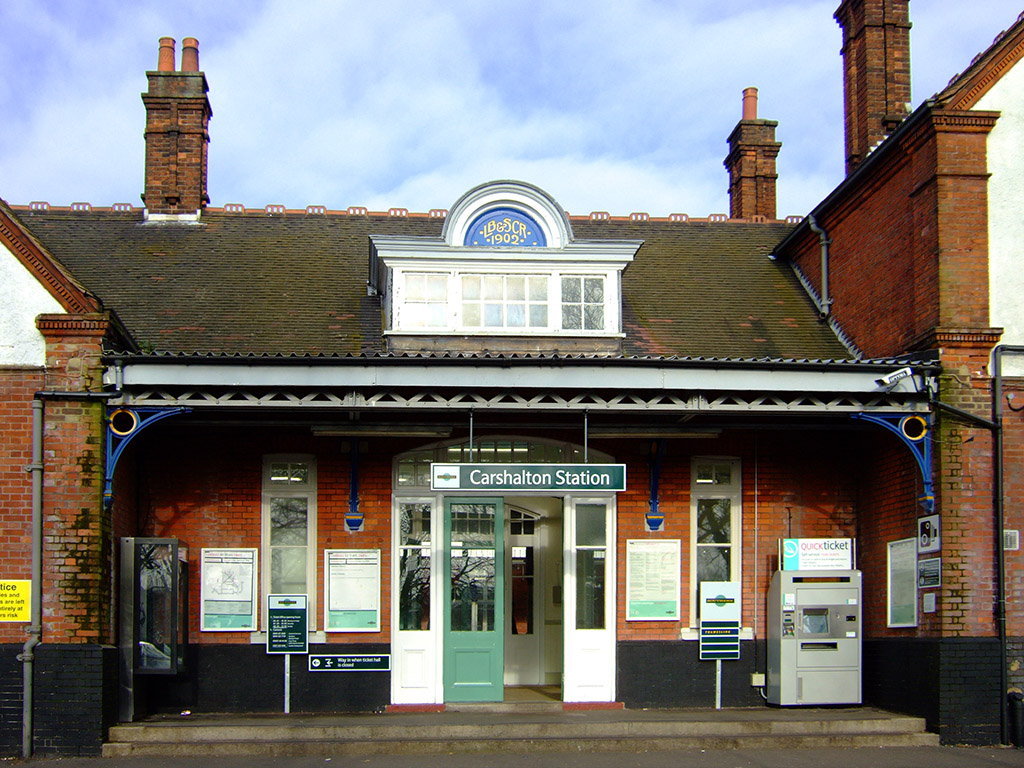
- Interactive map of Carshalton

General information
- Location: Carshalton
- Local authority: London Borough of Sutton
- Managed by: Southern
- Station code: CSH
- DfT category: D
- Number of platforms: 2
- Accessible: Yes
- Fare zone: 5

National Rail annual entry and exit
- 2021–22: ▲0.976 million
- 2022–23: ▲1.059 million
- 2023–24: ▲1.074 million
- 2024–25: ▲1.139 million
- 2025–26: ▲1.178 million

Key dates
- 1 October 1868: Opened
- 3 March 1929: Electrified

Other information
- External links: Departures; Facilities
- Coordinates: 51.3686°N 0.1659°W

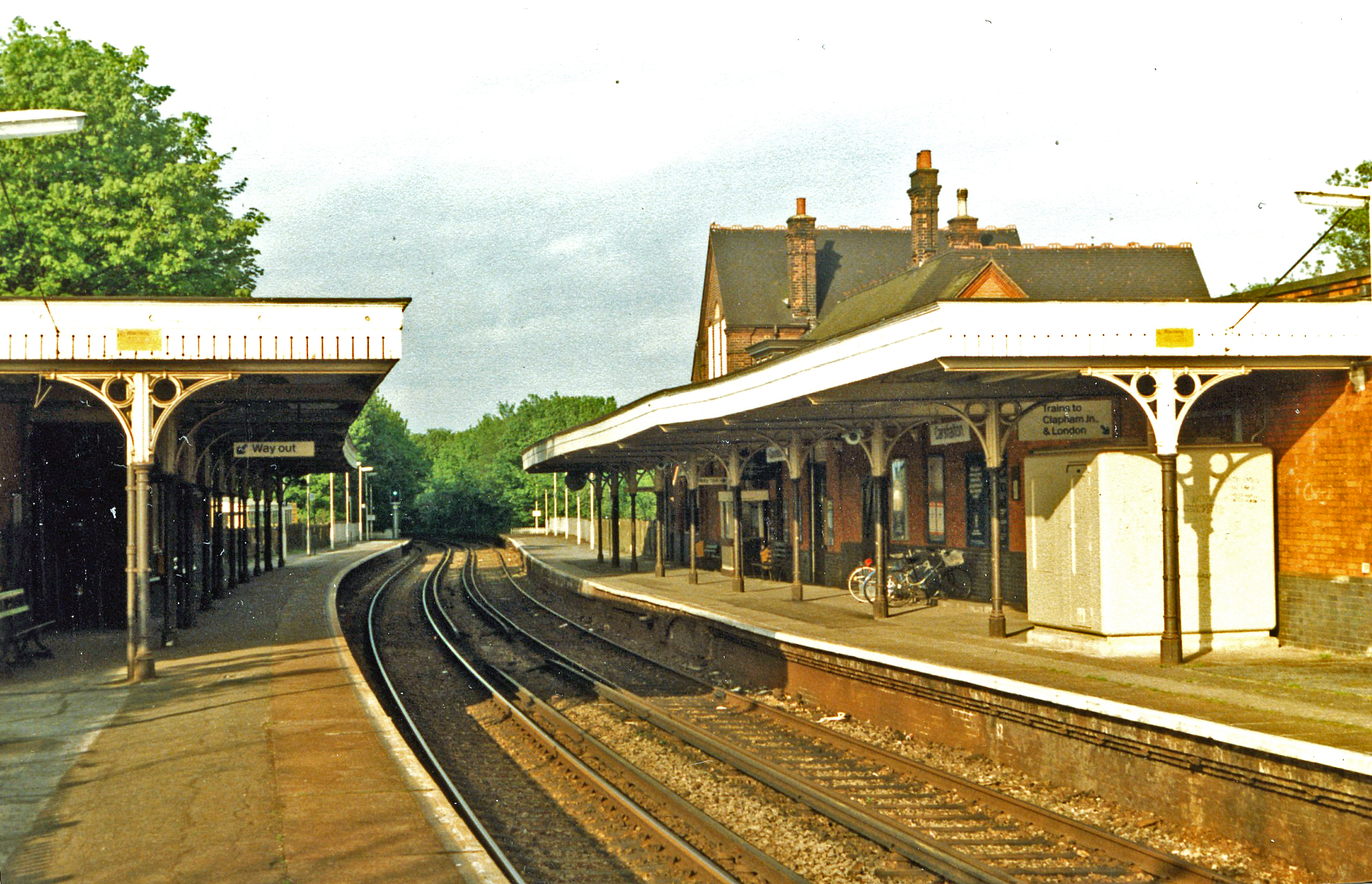
Platform view (1986)

Carshalton railway station is a railway station at Carshalton in the London Borough of Sutton in South London. It is located between Sutton and Hackbridge.

The station is served by Southern and Thameslink. It is in London fare zone 5. From here, one can catch a direct train to as far north as St Albans in Hertfordshire and southwards as far as Horsham in West Sussex. The shortest journey time from Carshalton to London Victoria is 25 minutes.

The station is on the line opened by the London, Brighton and South Coast Railway between Peckham Rye and Sutton on 1 October 1868: one of the many suburban lines opened by that company. The original station of Carshalton was built on the Sutton to West Croydon line in May 1847, 1 mile (1.6 km) to the south east and is now known as Wallington station.

The line runs along an embankment at this point: the ticket office is on the down side by the underbridge.

Ticket barriers control access to the platforms, the only entrance to the station is via the ticket office where a book stand is located. Passengers may borrow or swap the books.

== Services ==
Services at Carshalton are operated by Southern and Thameslink using Class 377 and 700 EMUs.

The typical off-peak service in trains per hour is:

- 2 tph to London Victoria
- 2 tph to St Albans City via Herne Hill returning back to St Albans City via Wimbledon.
- 2 tph to Sutton
- 2 tph to Dorking of which 1 continues to Horsham

During the peak hours, additional services between London Victoria and Epsom also call at the station, as well as a single return journey between Sutton and London Bridge.

On Saturday evenings (after approximately 18:45) and on Sundays, there is no service south of Dorking to Horsham.

Preceding station	National Rail	Following station
Hackbridge	Southern Sutton & Mole Valley Lines	Sutton
Hackbridge	Thameslink Sutton & Mole Valley Lines	Sutton

== Connections ==
London Buses routes 127, 157 and S3 serve the station.
