= Oaks Park (London) =

Public park in Carshalton, England

Coordinates: 51°20′18″N 0°10′05″W

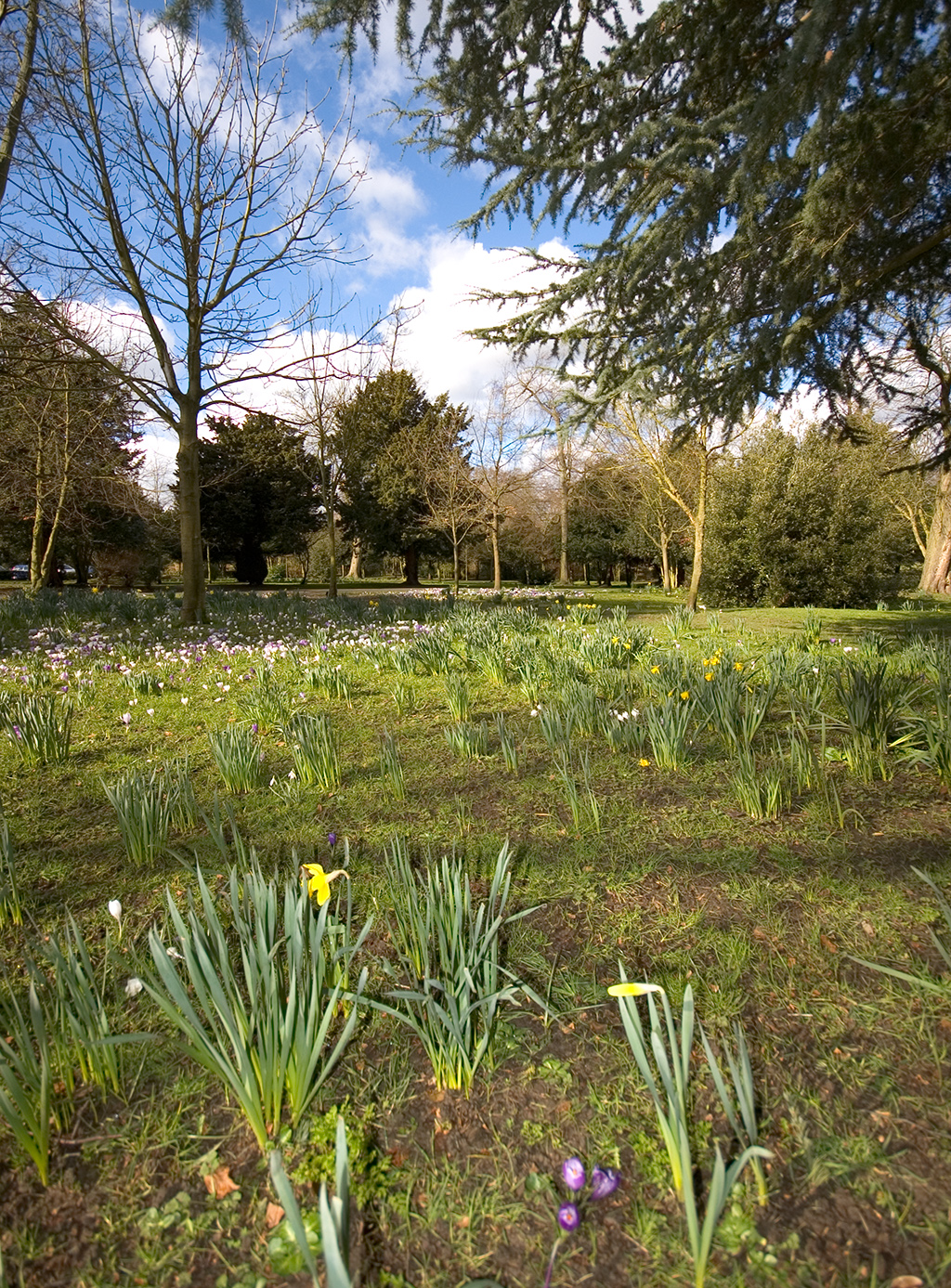
Oaks Park, Carshalton

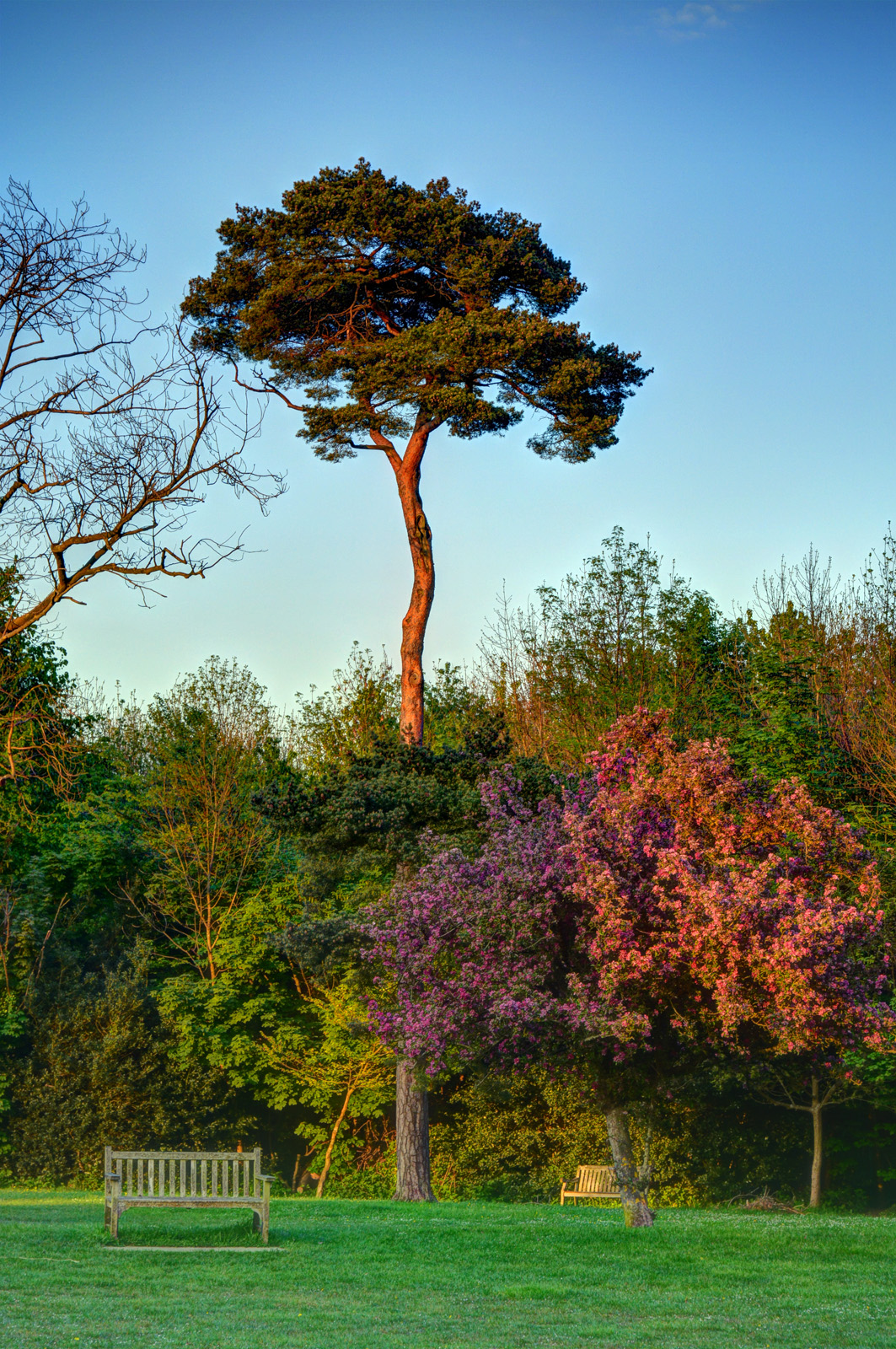
Trees in flower in Oaks Park

Oaks Park is a public park in Carshalton in the London Borough of Sutton. It is bounded on the south by Croydon Lane (A2022), and on the east by Woodmansterne Road; smaller roads lie to the west and north.

== History ==
The park was substantially laid out for the Earl of Derby in the 1770s and changes were made for John Burgoyne in the 1790s for the existing villa (built around 1750 for one Thomas Gosling). The fashionable landscape style was employed with trees forming a perimeter screen and placed in artful clumps to suggest a natural landscape. The house, which was partly rebuilt by Robert Taylor (architect) for John Burgoyne in 1775 and by Robert Adam for the 12th Earl of Derby in 1790, was demolished between 1956 and 1960 but the bakehouse, stable block and some outbuildings remain. Carshalton and District History and Archaeology Society carried out an archaeological investigation in July 2009.

== The Oaks horserace ==
The estate lent its name to the Oaks horserace which was inaugurated by the Earl in 1779 and is run annually during the Derby meeting at Epsom Downs Racecourse, about 4 miles to the west. The original Oaks Race ran from Barrow Hedges, north of The Oaks and through Oaks Park before heading west to approximately the site of the current Epsom Downs Racecourse. Part of the off-road route still exists.

== Recreation ==
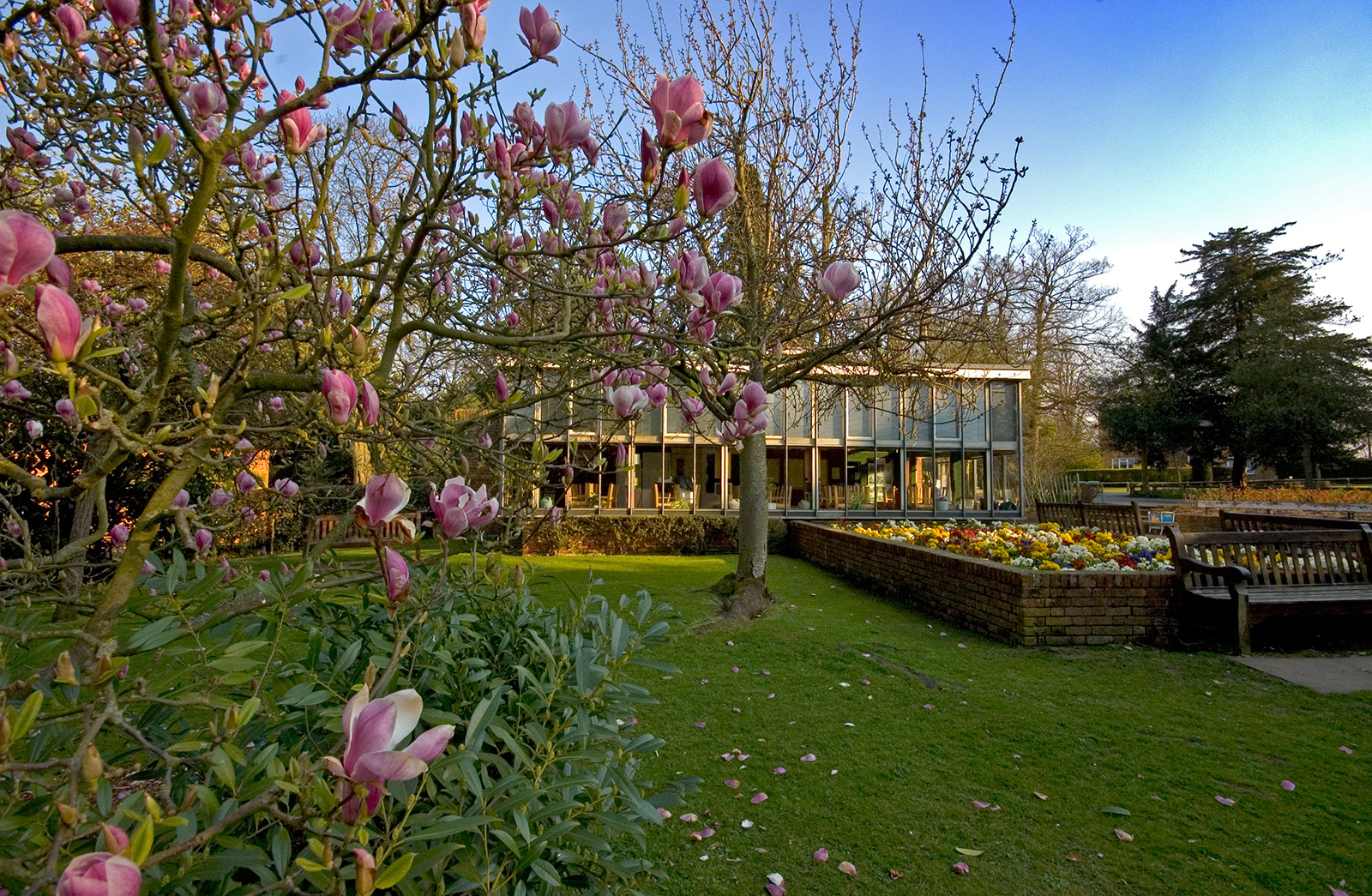
Café at Oaks Park

There is a public golf course and sports centre forming part of the open space. The park itself contains a craft centre, a café and a downland countryside walk.

The Oaks Sport Centre has a public golf course and a new indoor climbing and caving centre.

There is a bridle path that goes around the perimeter of the park for riding, cycling, and walking.

The park is on a section of the National Cycle Network (Route 20). A leisure trail along the River Wandle from Wandsworth, starts two miles away from the park at Carshalton and is available from the Sustrans website. The Wandle–Oaks Link joins the park to the Wandle Trail. Section 6 of the London Loop enters the park.

South of the park and close to Croydon Lane is the Mayfield Lavender Field. The field is spectacular during the midsummer months, filling the park with lavender aroma.

== Local transport ==
The nearest railway station to the park is at Carshalton Beeches, which is less than a mile walk along Woodmansterne Road. Trains serve various places in South London from here. The 166 bus route serves the park at the Croydon Lane end of the park. The bus route serves Banstead, Purley, and Croydon.

== See also ==
- Carshalton Park
- Grove Park
