= List of stations in London fare zone 5 =

Fare zone 5 is an outer zone of Transport for London's zonal fare system used for calculating the price of tickets for travel on the London Underground, London Overground, Docklands Light Railway (DLR) and, since 2007, on National Rail services. It was created on 22 May 1983 as Outer zone 3c, one of five zones introduced for the Travelcard. The zone took its current name on 8 January 1989. In January 1991 part of it was split off to create zone 6. It extends from approximately 9.75 to 12.75 miles (15.69 to 20.52 km) from Piccadilly Circus.

== List of stations ==
The following stations are within zone 5:

Station	Local authority	Managed by	Notes
Albany Park	Bexley	Southeastern	
Becontree	Barking and Dagenham	London Underground	
Belmont	Sutton	Southern	
Belvedere	Bexley	Southeastern	
Berrylands	Kingston	South Western Railway	
Bexleyheath	Bexley	Southeastern	
Bickley	Bromley	Southeastern	
Brimsdown	Enfield	Greater Anglia	
Bromley South	Bromley	Southeastern	
Buckhurst Hill	Epping Forest	London Underground	Outside Greater London (Note: All stations in Greater London are in fare zones 1–6. Typically, stations beyond the boundary with Transport for London ticketing are in fares zones 7–9 or special fares apply.)
Bush Hill Park	Enfield	London Overground	
Canons Park	Harrow	London Underground	
Carshalton	Sutton	Southern	
Carshalton Beeches	Sutton	Southern	
Chadwell Heath	Barking and Dagenham	Elizabeth line	
Cheam	Sutton	Southern	
Chingford	Waltham Forest	London Overground	
Chislehurst	Bromley	Southeastern	
Cockfosters	Enfield	London Underground	
Dagenham Dock	Barking and Dagenham	c2c	
Dagenham East	Barking and Dagenham	London Underground	
Dagenham Heathway	Barking and Dagenham	London Underground	
East Croydon	Croydon	Southern	
Eastcote	Hillingdon	London Underground	
Eden Park	Bromley	Southeastern	
Edgware	Barnet	London Underground	
Enfield Chase	Enfield	Great Northern	
Enfield Town	Enfield	London Overground	
Gordon Hill	Enfield	Great Northern	
Grange Park	Enfield	Great Northern	
Harrow & Wealdstone	Harrow	London Underground	
Harrow-on-the-Hill	Harrow	London Underground	
Hatton Cross	Hounslow	London Underground	Also in zone 6
Hayes	Bromley	Southeastern	
Hayes & Harlington	Hillingdon	Elizabeth line	
Headstone Lane	Harrow	London Overground	
High Barnet	Barnet	London Underground	
Hounslow	Hounslow	South Western Railway	
Hounslow West	Hounslow	London Underground	
New Barnet	Barnet	Great Northern	
Norbiton	Kingston	South Western Railway	
North Harrow	Harrow	London Underground	
Northolt	Ealing	London Underground	
Northolt Park	Ealing	Chiltern Railways	
Oakwood	Enfield	London Underground	
Petts Wood	Bromley	Southeastern	
Pinner	Harrow	London Underground	
Ponders End	Enfield	Greater Anglia	
Rayners Lane	Harrow	London Underground	
Ruislip Gardens	Hillingdon	London Underground	
Sidcup	Bexley	Southeastern	
South Croydon	Croydon	Southern	
South Harrow	Harrow	London Underground	
South Ruislip	Hillingdon	Chiltern Railways	
Southbury	Enfield	London Overground	
Stanmore	Harrow	London Underground	
Stoneleigh	Epsom and Ewell	South Western Railway	Outside Greater London
Strawberry Hill	Richmond	South Western Railway	
Sutton	Sutton	Southern	
Tolworth	Kingston	South Western Railway	
Twickenham	Richmond	South Western Railway	
Waddon	Croydon	Southern	
Wallington	Sutton	Southern	
West Croydon	Croydon	London Overground	
West Harrow	Harrow	London Underground	
West Sutton	Sutton	Thameslink	
West Wickham	Bromley	Southeastern	
Whitton	Richmond	South Western Railway	

== Changes ==
- January 1991: Zone 6 created from part of zone 5
- January 2005: Cheam and Belmont from zone 6 to zone 5
- January 2007: Stoneleigh from zone 6 to zone 5
