= London Buses route 157 =

London bus route

157
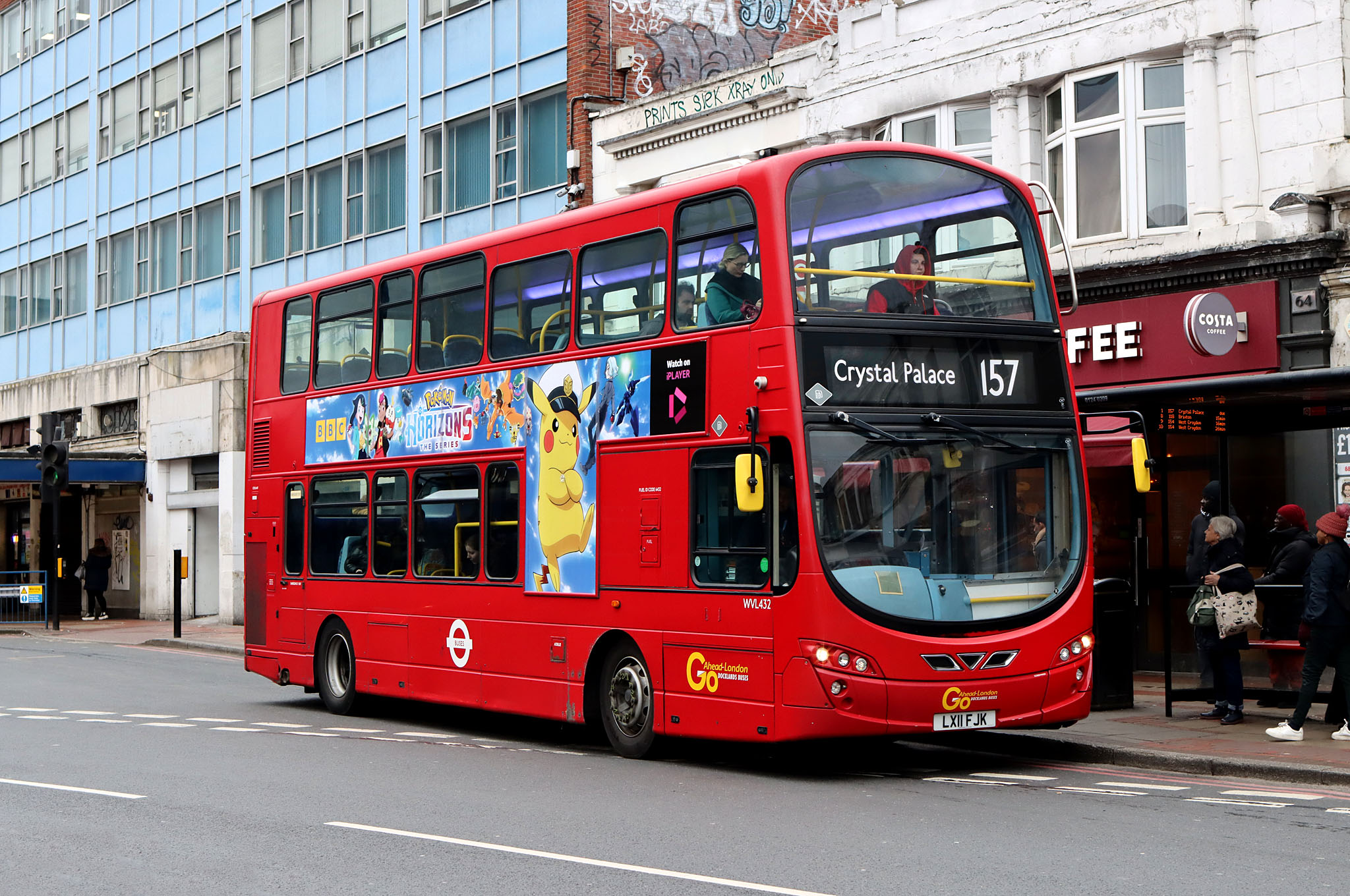
- London General Wright Eclipse Gemini 2 bodied Volvo B9TL at Morden station in January 2024

Overview
- Operator: Metrobus (Go-Ahead London)
- Garage: Croydon
- Vehicle: BYD Alexander Dennis Enviro400EV
- Peak vehicle requirement: 17
- Night-time: No night service

Route
- Start: Crystal Palace bus station
- Via: South Norwood; Croydon; Wallington; Carshalton; St Helier
- End: Morden station
- Length: 12 miles (19 km)

Service
- Level: Daily
- Frequency: About every 12-20 minutes
- Journey time: 46-83 minutes
- Operates: 04:20 until 02:01

London Buses route 157 is a Transport for London contracted bus route in London, England. Running between Crystal Palace bus station and Morden station, it is operated by Go-Ahead London subsidiary Metrobus.

== History ==
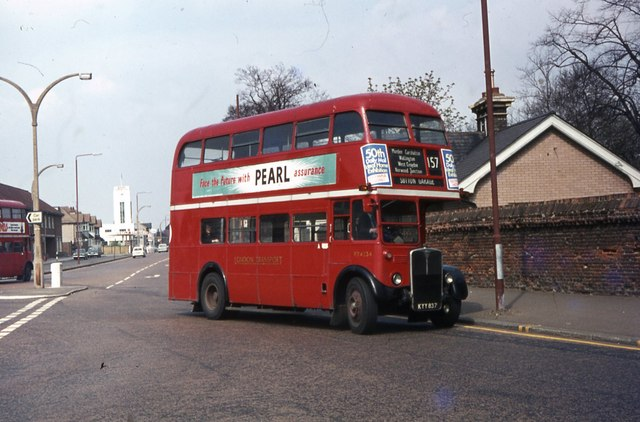
AEC Regent III RT in Morden in April 1973

Route 157 commenced operating on 13 September 1926 as a daily service between Morden station and Wallington (Melbourne Hotel) via Morden Road, Bishopsford Road, Sutton and Carshalton. It was one of five new London Underground feeder routes (155, 156, 157, 164 and 165) that were introduced to connect to the new Northern line station at Morden, which also opened on 13 September 1926. In 1959, it was extended from Wallington to Crystal Palace via Croydon, replacing trolleybus route 654.

From January 1973 until November 1985 it was operated by Thornton Heath garage, It was operated by Croydon garage from August 1987 until November 1988, when operation of the route moved to London General's Sutton garage.

Upon being re-tendered, route 157 passed to Connex's Beddington Cross garage on 1 December 2001 with Alexander ALX400 bodied Dennis Trident 2s. It was included in the sale of the business to Travel London in February 2004.

Upon being re-tendered, it was retained by Travel London with a new contract commencing on 2 December 2006. Route 157 was included in the May 2009 sale of Travel London to Abellio London. On 3 December 2016, Arriva London commenced operating the route after winning the tender with 18 existing Alexander Dennis Enviro400 double deckers. The route and buses were based from Norwood garage, however, drivers were based at Thornton Heath garage. This was due to space constraints at Thornton Heath garage. On Sundays and bank holidays the route and buses were based from Thornton Heath garage.

== Current route ==
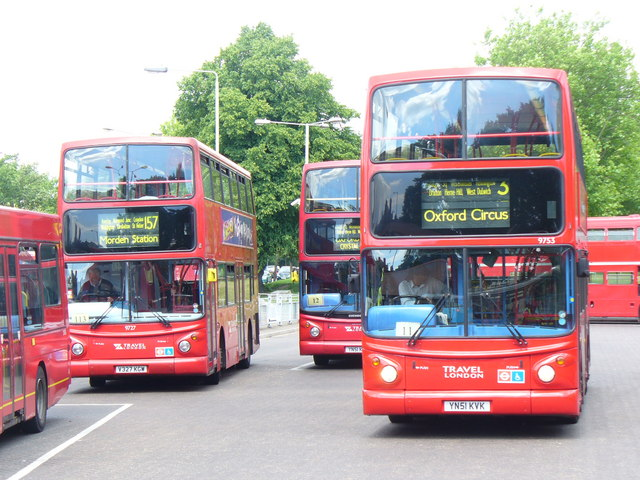
Travel London Dennis Trident 2 at Crystal Palace in June 2009

Route 157 operates via these primary locations:

- Crystal Palace bus station
- Crystal Palace station
- Anerley station
- South Norwood
- Selhurst station
- West Croydon bus station for West Croydon station
- Waddon station
- Wallington station
- Carshalton station
- St Helier Hospital
- Morden station
