= Carshalton Beeches railway station =

National Rail station in London, England

Carshalton Beeches
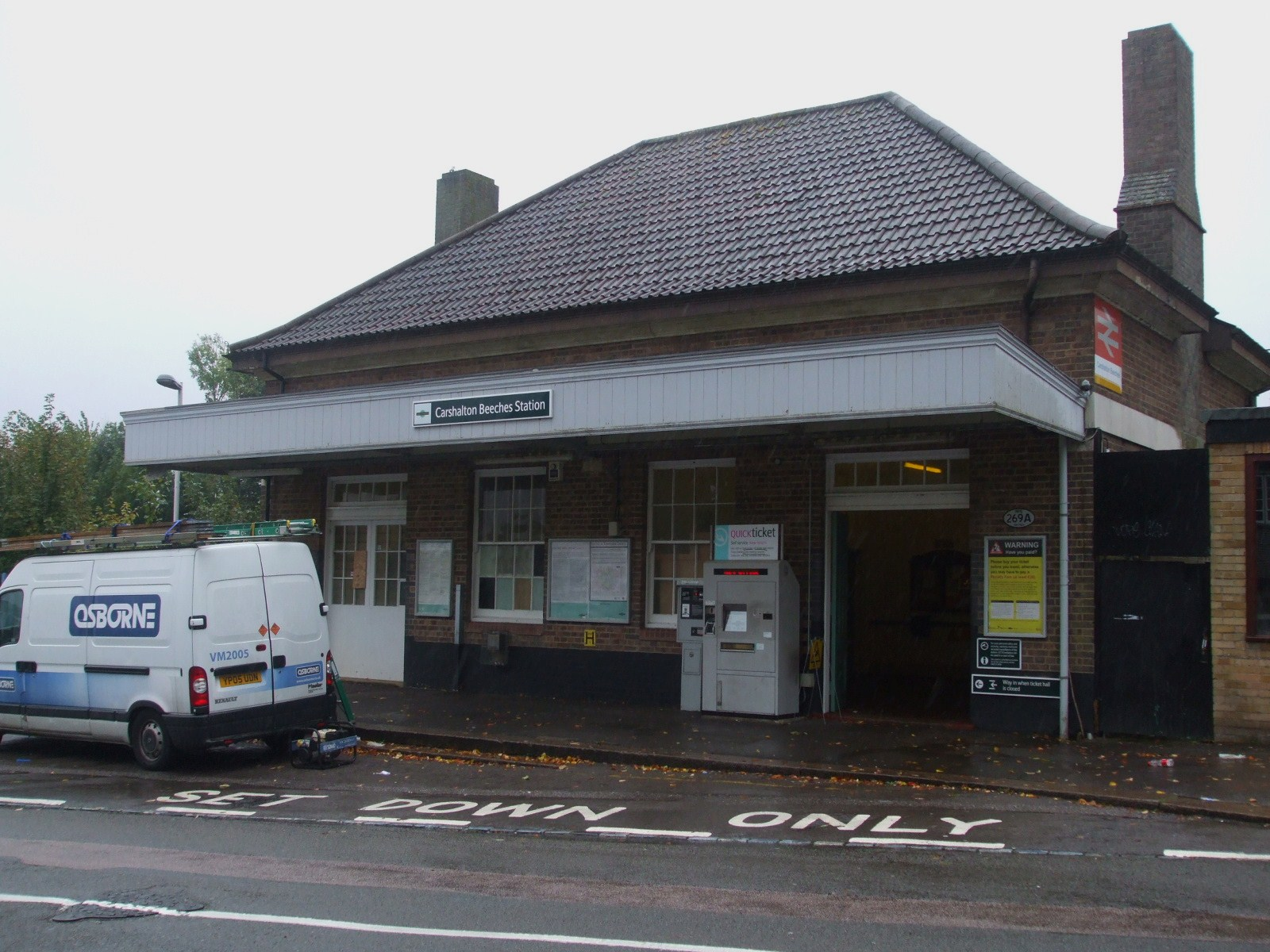
- Interactive map of Carshalton Beeches

General information
- Location: Carshalton
- Local authority: London Borough of Sutton
- Grid reference: TQ275636
- Managed by: Southern
- Station code: CSB
- DfT category: E
- Number of platforms: 2
- Fare zone: 5

National Rail annual entry and exit
- 2020–21: ▼0.199 million
- 2021–22: ▲0.478 million
- 2022–23: ▲0.626 million
- 2023–24: ▲0.689 million
- 2024–25: ▲0.787 million

Railway companies
- Original company: London, Brighton and South Coast Railway
- Pre-grouping: London, Brighton and South Coast Railway
- Post-grouping: Southern Railway

Key dates
- 1 October 1906: Opened as Beeches Halt
- 1 April 1925: Renamed Carshalton Beeches

Other information
- External links: Departures; Facilities
- Coordinates: 51.3573°N 0.1698°W

Carshalton Beeches railway station is in south Carshalton in the London Borough of Sutton in south London. The station, and all trains serving it, is operated by Southern, and is in London fare zone 5. It is between Wallington and Sutton, 13 miles 72 chains (13.90 miles, 22.37 km) down the line from London Bridge, measured via Forest Hill.

The station is under a mile from Oaks Park and can be accessed along Woodmansterne Road.

== Services ==
All services at Carshalton Beeches are operated by Southern using Class 377 EMUs.

The typical off-peak service in trains per hour is:

- 2 tph to London Bridge (non-stop from Norwood Junction)
- 2 tph to London Victoria via Norbury
- 2 tph to Epsom
- 2 tph to Epsom Downs

During the peak hours, the station is served by an additional half-hourly service between London Victoria and Sutton.

Preceding station	National Rail	Following station
Wallington	Southern Sutton & Mole Valley Lines	Sutton

== History ==
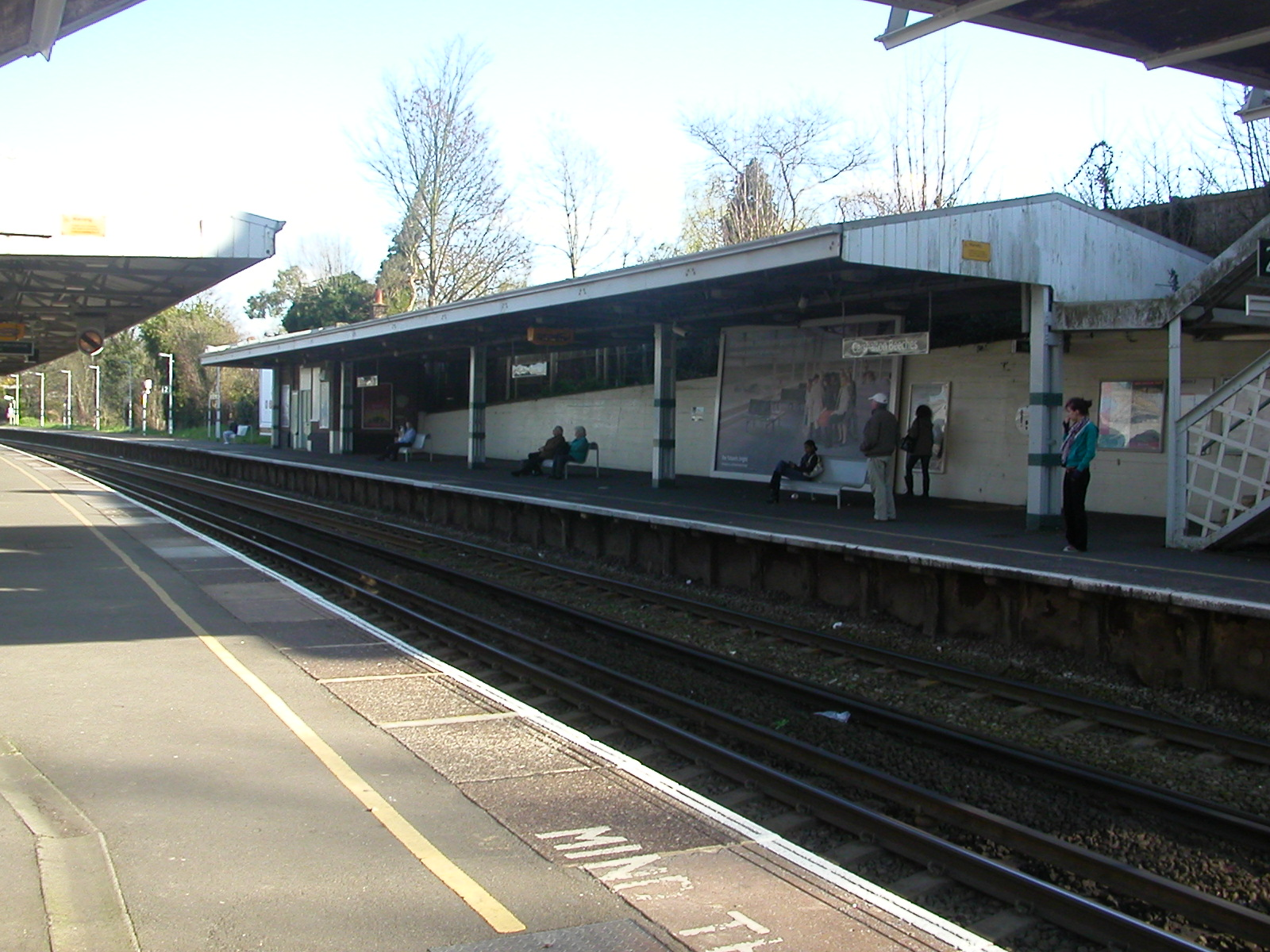
Platforms at Carshalton Beeches, looking from the western end.

The railway through Carshalton Beeches opened in 1847 when track was laid between Epsom, Sutton and West Croydon but it was not until 1 October 1906 that a halt named Beeches Halt was opened in the small settlement, at the north end of Beeches Avenue (at the time called Beechnut Tree Walk). That same year a tram service between Sutton and Croydon opened. Beeches Halt was served by steam rail-motors (early multiple units) running between West Croydon and Epsom Downs.

As residential development continued, demand increased and the Sutton to London line was electrified in 1925 using 6600 V, 25 Hz AC, overhead electrification (OLE), replacing passenger steam traction. At that time the halt was upgraded, a new station built, renamed Carshalton Beeches on 1 April 1925 and the road bridge was rebuilt. The OLE was replaced by the Southern standard of 650 V DC third rail in 1930.

The station's centenary was celebrated in October 2006 and in September 2010 the station foyer was completely reworked to allow a larger ticket office and for electronic ticket barriers to be put in. These are now operational. Further work was completed in 2012 giving disabled access to the London-bound platform only and also adding an area for the parking of bicycles.

== Connections ==
The London Bus Route 154 serves the station; connects the area with Carshalton-on-the-Hill, South Beddington, St Helier Hospital, and Morden.

== Local attractions close to the station ==
There are two lavender fields within walking distance of the station. One is at Oaks Way, on the Stanley Park Allotments and is run as a not-for-profit community project; set up from the European funded BioRegional development fund.

The Mayfield Lavender Field is situated near Oaks Park and is just over a mile walk from the station. This is a 25-acre commercial site in Croydon Lane and, due to its size, is popular for photography and overseas visitors.

The Oaks Park is situated less than a mile walk along Beeches Avenue and Woodmansterne Road.

There are various walking paths 10–15 minutes walk from the station along Woodmansterne Road – Sutton Countryside Walk and the London Loop (section 5 and 6). Also, national cycle route 20 passes the station.

Little Holland House is located less than a five-minute walk from the station. Situated on Beeches Avenue, the house is an example of the local Arts and Crafts movement in the early 20th century.
