= CSUSB College of Social and Behavioral Sciences =

College of California State University, San Bernardino

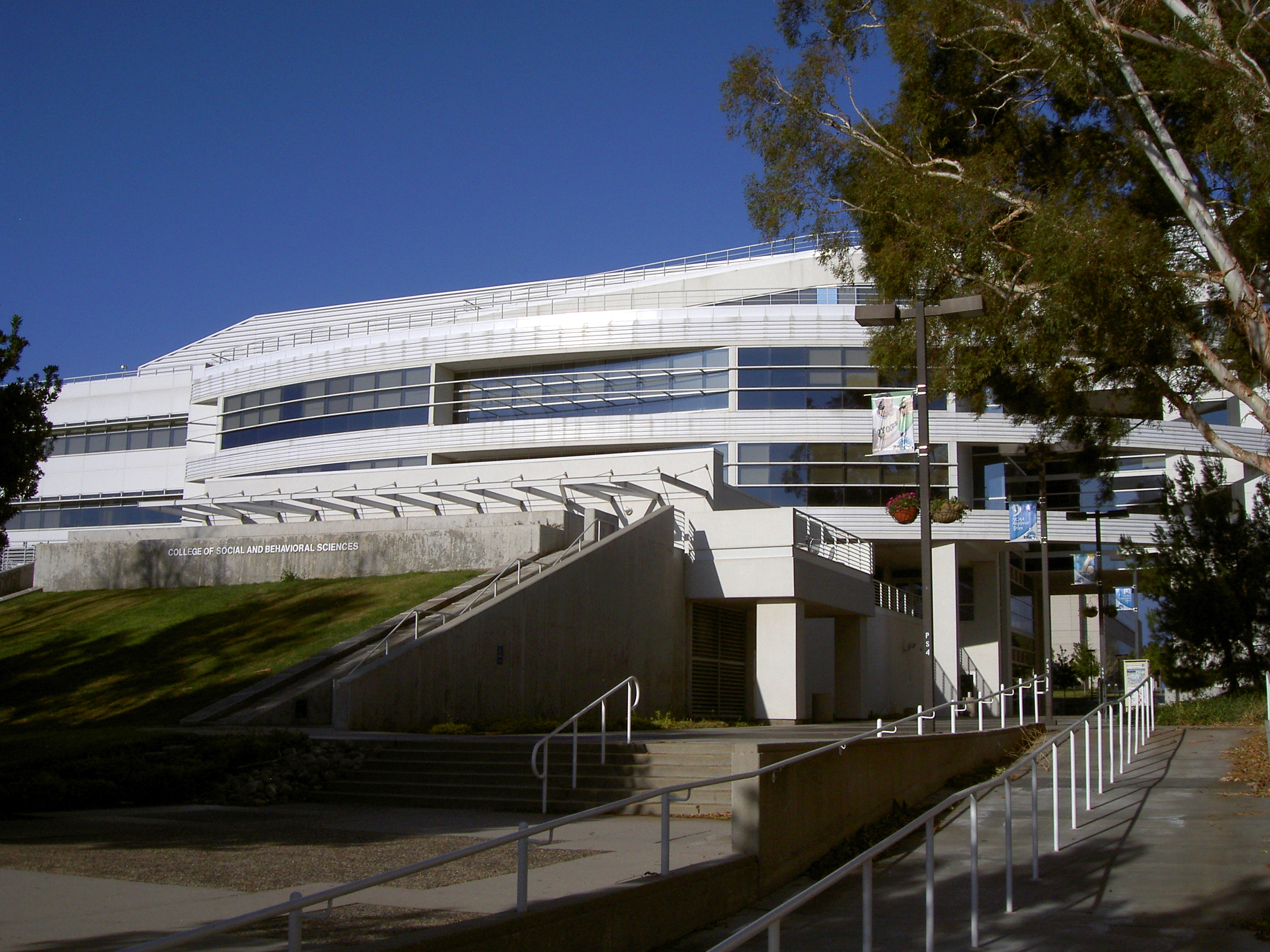
College of Social and Behavioral Sciences

The California State University, San Bernardino College of Social and Behavioral Sciences is one of six academic colleges at CSUSB located in San Bernardino, California, United States. Comprising ten departments/schools and various specialties, the college offers bachelor's and master's. The college strives to produce educated graduates who possess both a fundamental understanding of their fields and the essential professional skills needed by local and regional industries. The college provides business information for all California State University, San Bernardino graduates. The college has many accredited programs.

Part of the college, the National Security Studies Master of Arts degree is a two-year program that offers a comprehensive curriculum for students interested in pursuing careers in national service. It is one of three such programs in the country and the only one in the California State University system. The university also has collaborative educational programs with nearby Fort Irwin.

== Academics ==
=== Degrees ===
- BA
- BS
- MA
- MS

=== Departments & Schools ===
The College of Social and Behavioral Sciences includes several academic departments/schools:

- Anthropology
- Criminal Justice
- Economics
- Geography
- History
- Political Science
- Psychology
- Social Work
- Sociology

== See also ==
- California State University, San Bernardino
