= California Shuttle Bus =

American private bus company

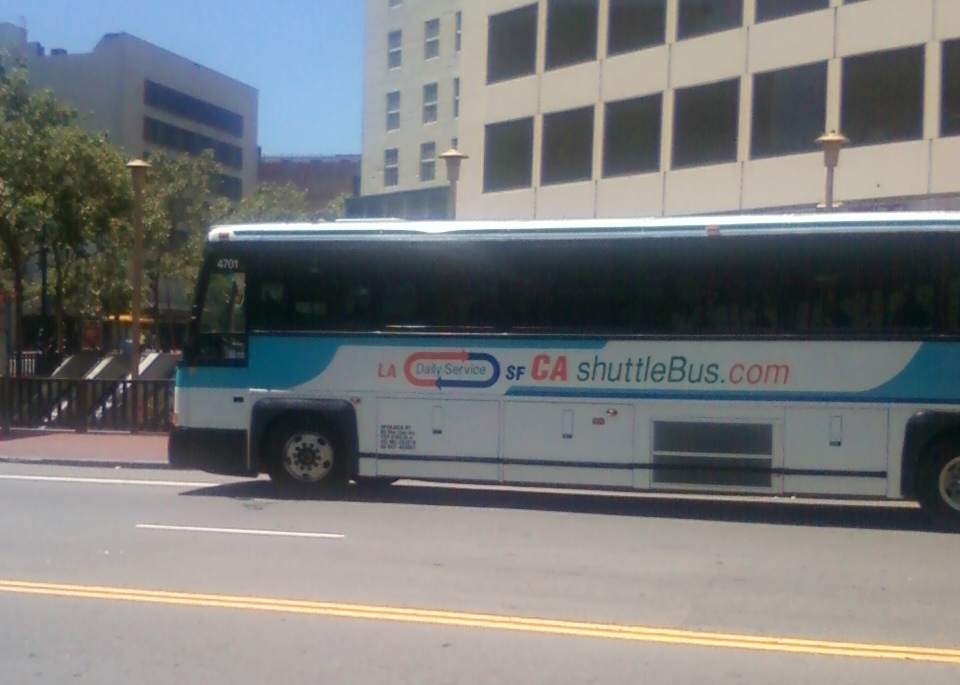
California Shuttle Bus at Powell Street station

California Shuttle Bus was a private bus company that provides daily bus services between Los Angeles and San Francisco, making one stop in San Jose. Founded in 2003, the company used 47-seat charter buses from MCI.

== History ==
The company launched its services in 2003. The service was initially launched as a $40 one-way service between the Los Angeles area and the San Francisco Bay Area.

In 2008, the company started offering $5 trips, but prices later increased to $25–40. The advent of the $5 fares coincided with the cessation of Megabus service from LA to the Bay Area. Megabus has since resumed service between the Bay Area and Los Angeles.

== Service ==
The company offered once-daily bus service between Los Angeles and San Francisco/San Jose areas comparable to Greyhound or Amtrak Thruway, the former its main competitor Bus stops were located at major transit centers, hotels, and downtown areas. In Northern California, major stops included Powell Street station in downtown San Francisco and San Jose Diridon station. In Southern California, major stops were at Union Station, Santa Monica, Hollywood, and North Hollywood Metro station.

It was called a "cheap alternative for students"; although originally envisioned to attract upmarket travelers from long waits at airports, it attracted mostly backpackers, senior citizens, business people, and bargain hunters. Patrons could pay a higher fare to guarantee that their adjoining seat is empty for their comfort. Similar to Megabus, California Shuttle Bus used a dynamic pricing model where prices started very low and gradually increased as tickets were sold. Prices generally started at $15. Assigned seating was added in 2013. The company suspended services in mid-2017.
