= Colegio San Benito =

Private Pre-K–12 school in Mayagüez, Puerto Rico

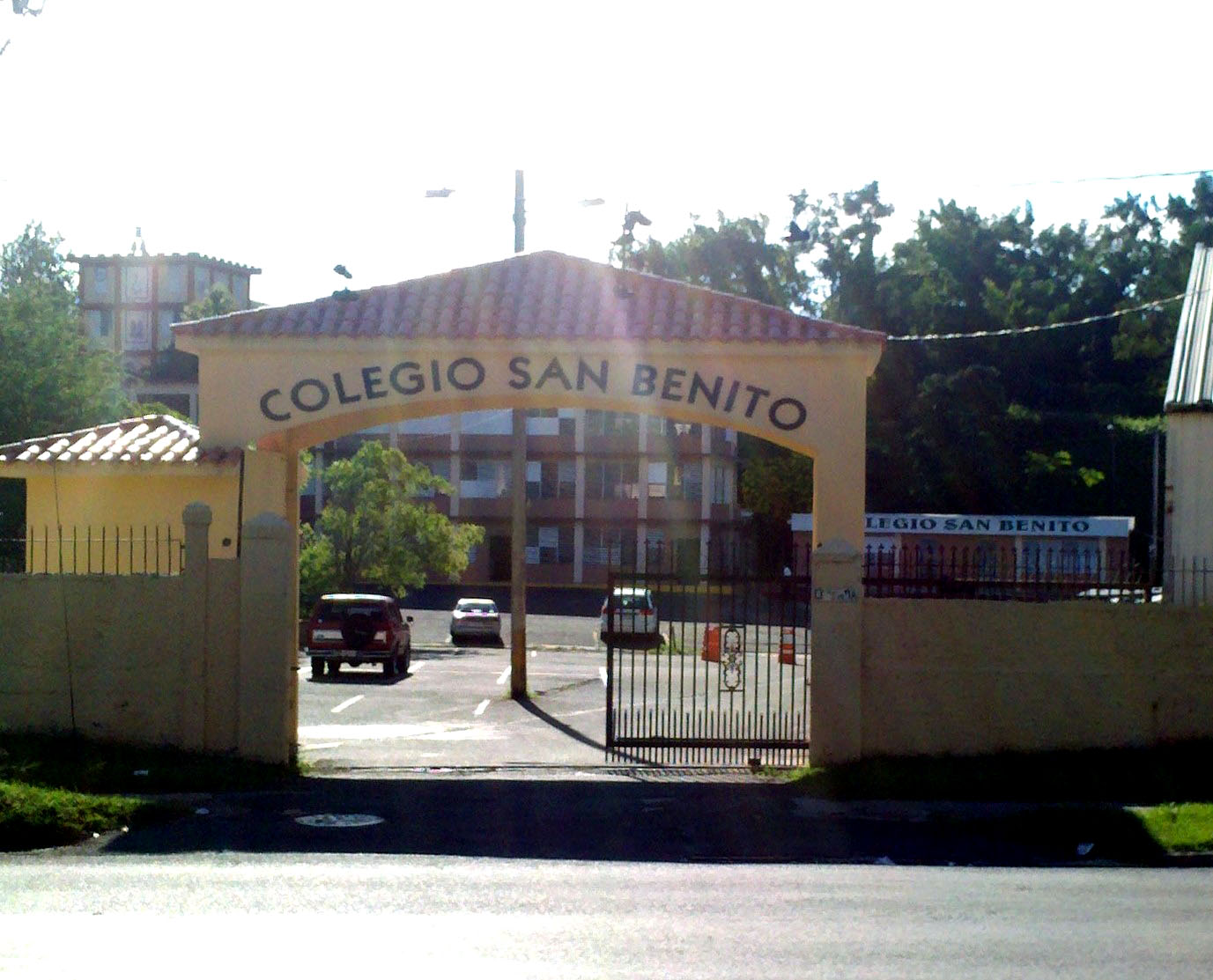

Location
- Carr. 348, Km.0.4 Quebrada Grande; Mayagüez, Puerto Rico 00680
- Coordinates: 18°11′08.88″N 67°08′19.99″W

Information
- Type: Private school
- Motto: “Pray and Work”
- Established: 1965
- Principal: Mrs. Mercedes Conde
- Grades: PK-12

Colegio San Benito ("CSB") is a private Roman Catholic, university-preparatory and elementary school, founded in Mayagüez, Puerto Rico in 1965. The school was the first boys-only Catholic school founded in the area of Mayagüez.

== History ==
The idea of Colegio San Benito was an accident. The same as such, was never in the minds of the community of Samos in the order of St. Benedict, Lugo, Spain. At the time of Trujillo and a trip he made to Spain, the Abbot of Samos, Reverend Father Mauro Gomez, had an encounter with Trujillo in one of the ministries of the Spanish government. During the conversation, General Trujillo offered to establish in the Republic of Santo Domingo in the Dominican government's expense, a Technical College, to later donate it to the community of Samos. Been subjected the tenders and the conditions throughout the plan to a decision, it decides to accept the leadership of the university. Agustin Santos and Celestino Perez went there to see the site of this leaflet. Noting the inability of the company, they moved to Puerto Rico, to the Colegio de San Antonio de Humacao. Here they taught and did some parish work for several years. Residing in Humacao, they'd established contact with the industrial Ramón Arbona, who shows them the idea of a school in Mayagüez, in honor of his son, who died in a plane crash. In order to have closer relations these two parents moved to Mayagüez, and Bishop McManus put in charge of the church of the Sacred Heart. Result of good relations between the two sides reached the final agreement to lift a school, Colegio San Benito. Don Ramón Arbona bought the land adjacent to the church, some twenty blocks and built around the year of 1964 the first building of three floors. Thanks to the devotion of parents who gave the opportunity to their sons to be educated in the first school for boys in the city and the group of teachers who were pioneers in determining the start of San Benito made the new institution very welcomed as it has been for years.

== School and community ==
Colegio San Benito consists of two academic buildings (an elementary school and a high school), the Monasterio de San Benito, one cafeterias, one chapel, two courts, one inside court, one gym, green areas and an amphitheater. Colegio San Benito's system is bilingual. The school contains the largest rosary of the island.

The current campus' main buildings are located at Quebrada Grande, Mayagüez, west of Puerto Rico.

In 2011, the College Board of Puerto Rico and Latin America recognized the school for obtaining the highest average in the EXANI-II among all private schools in Puerto Rico by honoring the Adolfo Fortier Award.

Colegio San Benito is accredited by the Middle States Association of Colleges and Schools. Students' organizations include: National Honor Society (NHS), Student council

== Timeline of events ==
- September 8, 1959 - First mass was said by the Benedictine Fathers in the Church of the Sacred Heart.
- 1964 - The first building is built on two floors.
- August 23, 1965 - Classes begin in San Benito with grades Kindergarten, First, Second and Third grade.
- August 12, 1975 - First high school graduation. That day was the first achievement of years of work.
- 1994 - First class consisting of boys and girls graduated.

== Sports ==
The school is recognized for its basketball and volleyball teams. Sports played include basketball, volleyball, soccer, and indoor soccer.

== Gallery ==
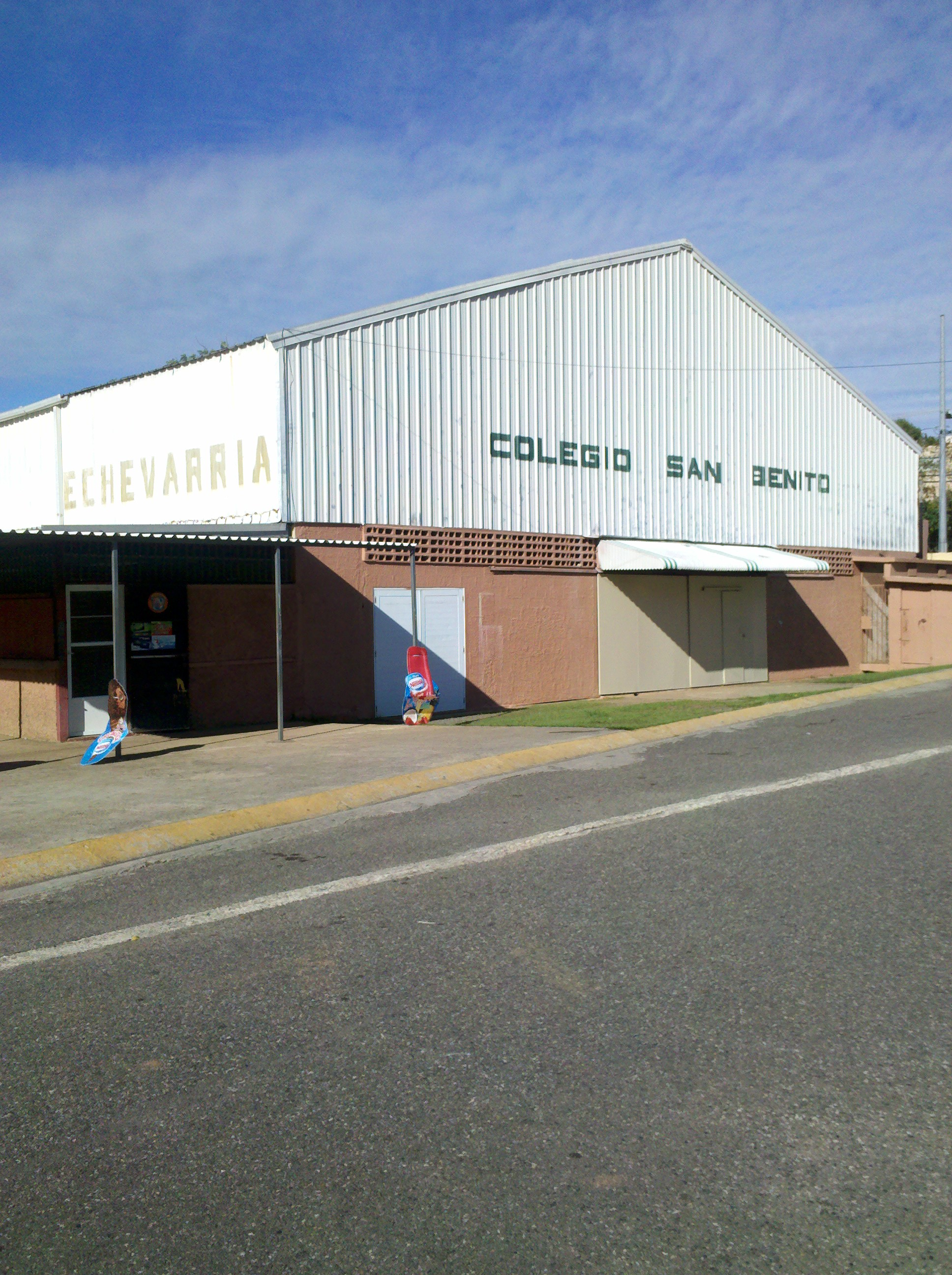
Basketball Court

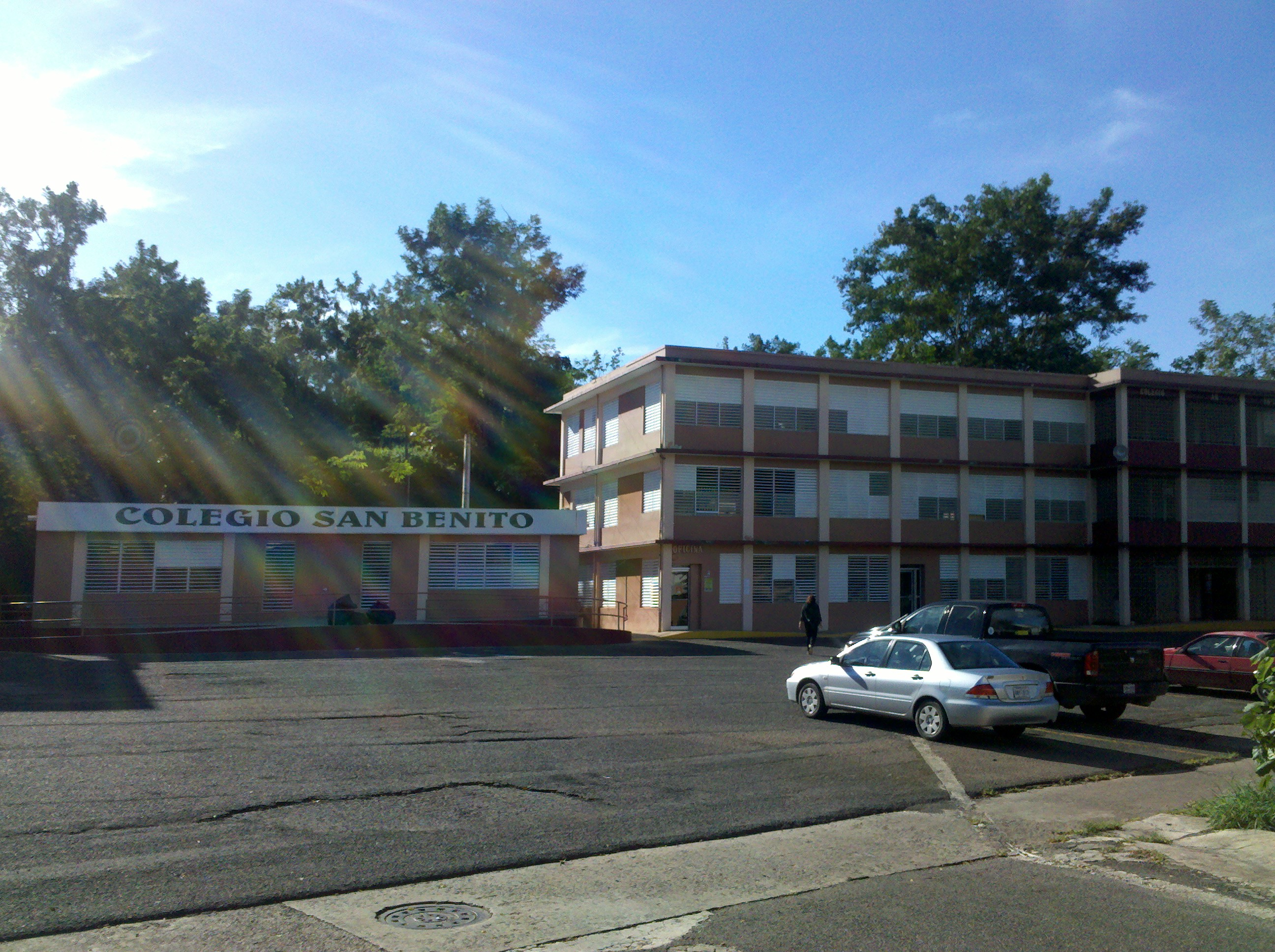
High School building

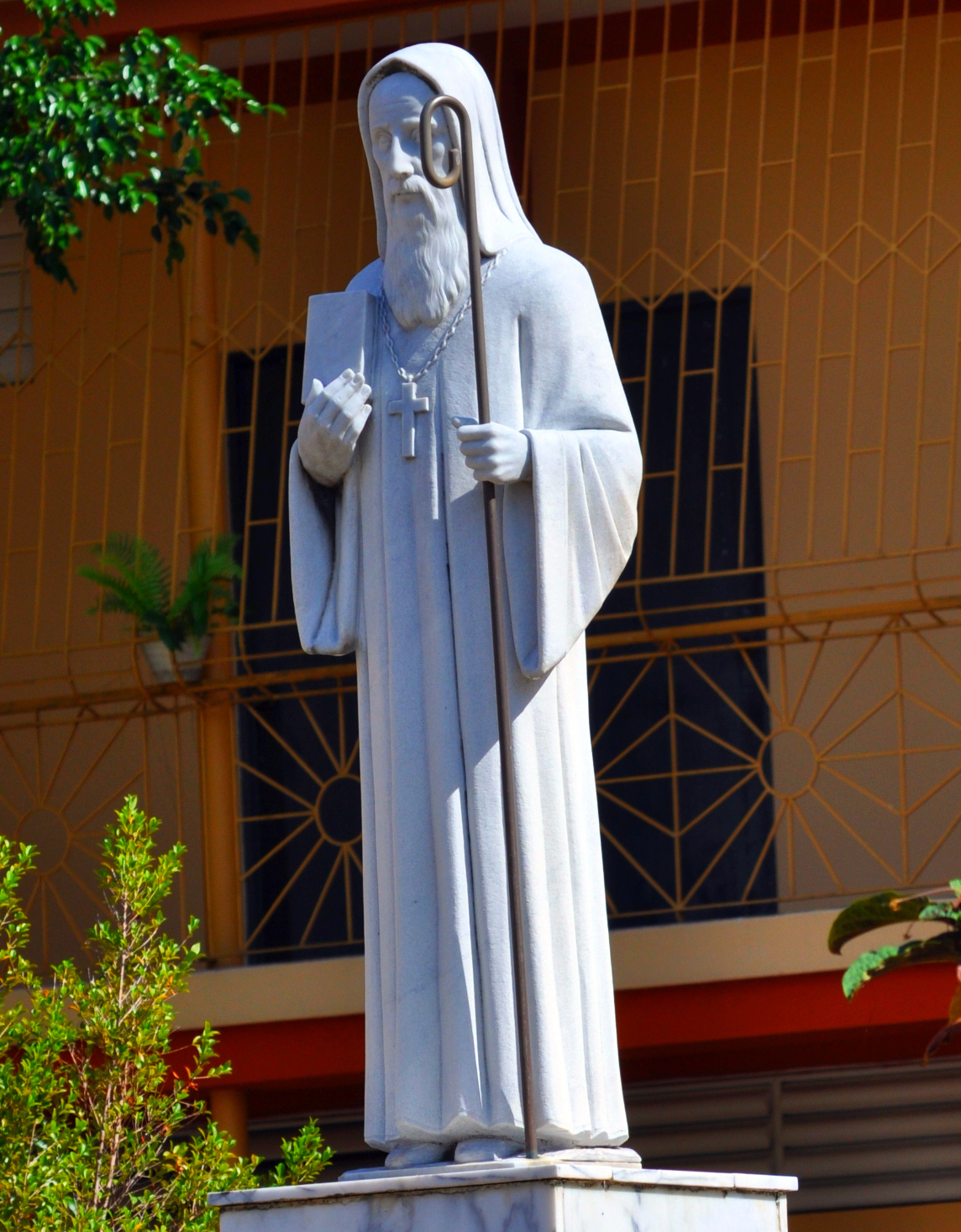
Statue of Saint Benito de Abad

== Notable alumni ==
- José Juan Barea
