= Concordia University Television =

Student-run television station at Concordia University

Concordia University Television (CUTV) is Canada's oldest student-owned and operated television station. CUTV was founded as TVSG (TV Sir George) in 1966 in the Montreal area on the campus of Concordia University. CUTV has a strong focus on media literacy and training. The station was under the umbrella of the Concordia Student Broadcasting Corporation (CSBC), along with CJLO and the Concordia Amateur Radio Club (CUARC, callsign VE2CUA).

Concordia University Television (CUTV) was a member owned and operated subsidiary of the non-profit corporation Concordia Student Broadcasting Society (CSBS) and whose primary purpose is to operate a TV station and video production facilities. CUTV distributes in-house, collaborative and external independent content through its closed-circuit TV network, DVD releases, internet-based distribution networks and Public-access television channels.

CUTV is a Campus/Community TV and video production studio that provides an essential service to those in the Concordia and Montreal communities whose needs are not met by mainstream commercial TV stations and video production facilities. CUTV also serves as a viable community resource by providing the space, equipment and know-how of video production to student and community populations that are interested in producing content that accurately represents them and their interests.

== 2012 Quebec student tuition boycott ==
CUTV gained visibility during 2012 for its live coverage of protests held against Plan Nord, as well as the 2012 student protests held in the Greater Montreal area pertaining to the planned post-secondary tuition hikes.

The station used a broadcast system that allowed them to send images live over the cellular phone network, allowing for coverage of events that traditional television network news journalists could not access with their satellite trucks. Additionally, their images went out live, rather than with a timing delay, and offered an alternative perspective on the events.

== 2020 Vote of No Confidence ==
In 2020, CUTV’s board of directors underwent a vote of no confidence. A petition signed by 50 members expressed that did not feel adequately represented by the administration. The members claimed the newly elected board members stacked the board election with friends and colleagues to accumulate votes. The petition also highlighted the potential conflict of interest between the chair of the annual general meeting due to his personal relationship with three elected board members. The removal vote failed by a margin of 10 votes at a special general meeting.

== Controversy involving The Breach ==
In October 2024, a former board member leaked a memorandum of understanding between CUTV and Canadian news website The Breach along with their resignation letter to Concordia student media. The document outlined an incubation deal where CUTV would transfer 360,000$ in annual increments from 2021 to 2025. These transfers equated to between 13.3% and 25.9% of CUTV’s annual income. The resignation letter also outlined potential conflicts of interest including Dru Oja Jay’s dual role as CUTV’s Executive Director and Publisher of The Breach. Other potential conflicts of interest included former CUTV board members who served as editors or board members of The Breach.

At the 2024 annual general meeting, a CUTV member proposed a motion for CUTV to opt out of the memorandum of understanding. Following this motion, another member called for quorum to be counted and left the room with several other members, forcing the adjournment of the annual general meeting.
