= Norwood Junction railway station =

National rail station in London, England

Norwood Junction
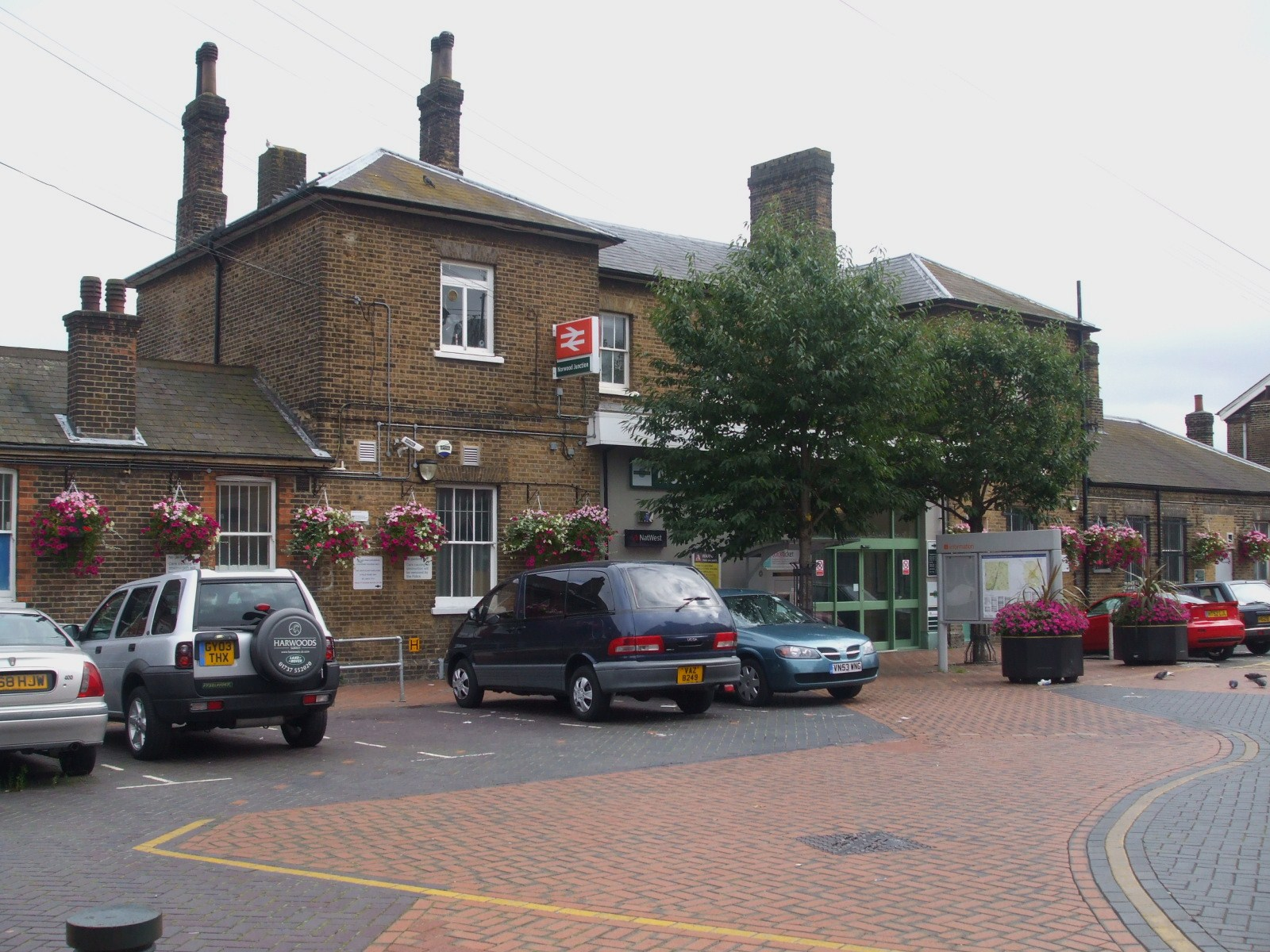
- Station entrance
- Interactive map of Norwood Junction

General information
- Location: South Norwood
- Local authority: London Borough of Croydon
- Managed by: London Overground
- Owner: Network Rail
- Station code: NWD
- DfT category: C2
- Number of platforms: 6 (Formerly 7)
- Accessible: Yes (Platform 1 Northbound only)
- Fare zone: 4

National Rail annual entry and exit
- 2020–21: ▼1.490 million
- Interchange: ▼0.282 million
- 2021–22: ▲3.017 million
- Interchange: ▲0.605 million
- 2022–23: ▲3.806 million
- Interchange: ▲1.159 million
- 2023–24: ▲4.325 million
- Interchange: ▼0.907 million
- 2024–25: ▲4.627 million
- Interchange: ▲0.910 million

Railway companies
- Original company: London & Croydon Railway

Key dates
- 5 June 1839: Opened as Jolly Sailor
- October 1846: Renamed Norwood
- 1 June 1859: Resited
- 1865: LBSCR Goods Shed built
- 1 October 1910: Renamed Norwood Junction and South Norwood for Woodside
- 13 June 1955: Renamed Norwood Junction

Other information
- External links: Departures; Facilities
- Coordinates: 51.39722°N 0.07500°W

Norwood Junction is an interchange station between the Windrush line of the London Overground and National Rail services operated by Southern and Thameslink, located in South Norwood in the London Borough of Croydon. Situated in London fare zone 4, it is 8 miles 55 chains (8.69 miles, 13.98 km) down the line from London Bridge.

== History ==
The station has occupied two sites under three names.

=== Jolly-sailor and Norwood stations ===
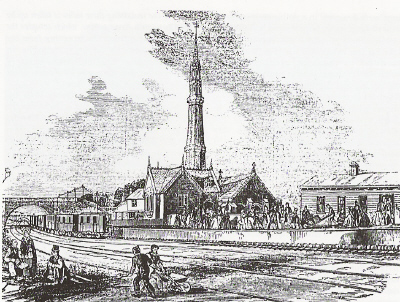
Jolly-sailor station in 1845, showing the atmospheric railway pumping station, with its Gothic chimney vent, in the foreground.

In 1839 the London and Croydon Railway opened Jolly-sailor station — "Jolly-sailor near Beulah Spa" on fares lists and timetables — at the north end of the High Street, adjacent to the Portland Road level crossing. From 1841 the lines through Norwood were used by the London and Brighton Railway and from 1842 the South Eastern Railway, but neither of these companies used the station. (The Jolly Sailor is a pub — originally the Jolly Sailor Inn — on the corner of Portland Road and High Street. The original pub was rebuilt around the late 1860s.)

In 1844 the L&CR was given parliamentary authority to test an experimental atmospheric railway system on the railway. A pumping station was built on Portland Road to create a vacuum in a continuous pipe located centrally between the rails. A piston extended downwards from the trains into a slit in the pipe, with trains blown towards the pumping station by atmospheric pressure. The pumping station was in a Gothic style, with a very tall ornate tower that served both as a chimney and as an exhaust vent for air pumped from the propulsion tube.

As part of the works for the atmospheric system, the world's first railway flyover was constructed beyond the south end of the station to carry the atmospheric line over the conventional London & Brighton Railway steam line. At the same time the level crossing at Portland Road was replaced by a low bridge across the road.

In July 1846 the L&CR merged with the L&BR to form the London Brighton and South Coast Railway, and the station was renamed Norwood in the same year - it became Norwood Junction by 1856. The LB&SCR abandoned atmospheric propulsion in 1847.

Following construction of lines to Crystal Palace the station closed on 1 June 1859 and was replaced by the current station located at the end of a short approach road off the south side of the A213 road. The original station building was used as a private house until the 1960s, when it was demolished.

=== Norwood Junction rail accident ===
The Norwood Junction railway crash occurred on 1 May 1891, when the cast-iron bridge over Portland Road fractured under an express train from Brighton to London.

== The present station ==
The station opened on 1 June 1859 by the LB&SCR. It was renamed Norwood Junction and South Norwood on 1 October 1910 but reverted to its original name on 13 June 1955 though some tickets and publications continued to use the pre-1955 name for sometime thereafter. There are seven platforms but only five are in use. Ticket barriers control access to all platforms. The LB&SCR goods shed built in 1865 remains in place, now used as railway offices.

=== Platforms 1 & 2 ===
Platform 1 is the first platform when entering via the main entrance and is the only platform accessible without having to negotiate the subway via stairs. Its main use is for trains northwards to Highbury & Islington, London Bridge and London Victoria; most stop at all stations. They mainly come from West Croydon, Caterham, Sutton and Epsom. The platform is used for Windrush line (London Overground) and Southern trains.

Platform 2 serves the same track as Platform 1 but passengers are not able to join or alight as the doors open only on the Platform 1 side.

=== Platform 3 ===
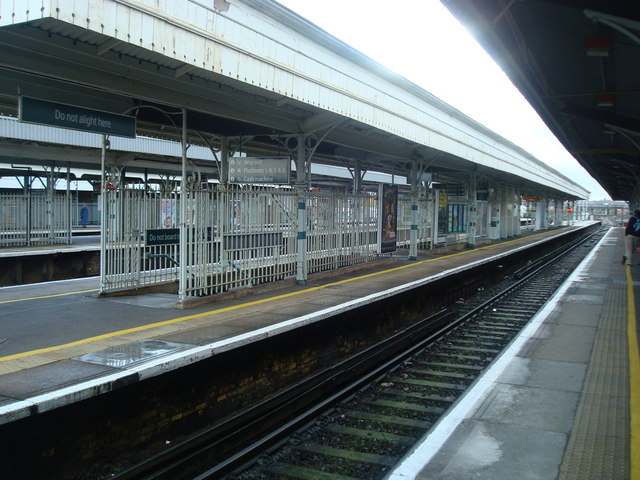
Platform 1,2 & 3 at Norwood Junction when the station was managed by Southern. (view from Platform 1)

Platform 3 is mainly used for northbound trains terminating at Bedford via London Bridge. Many passengers use this platform to go to central London, London St Pancras International & Luton Airport Parkway. The platform serves both fast and stopping services, and is mainly used by Thameslink.

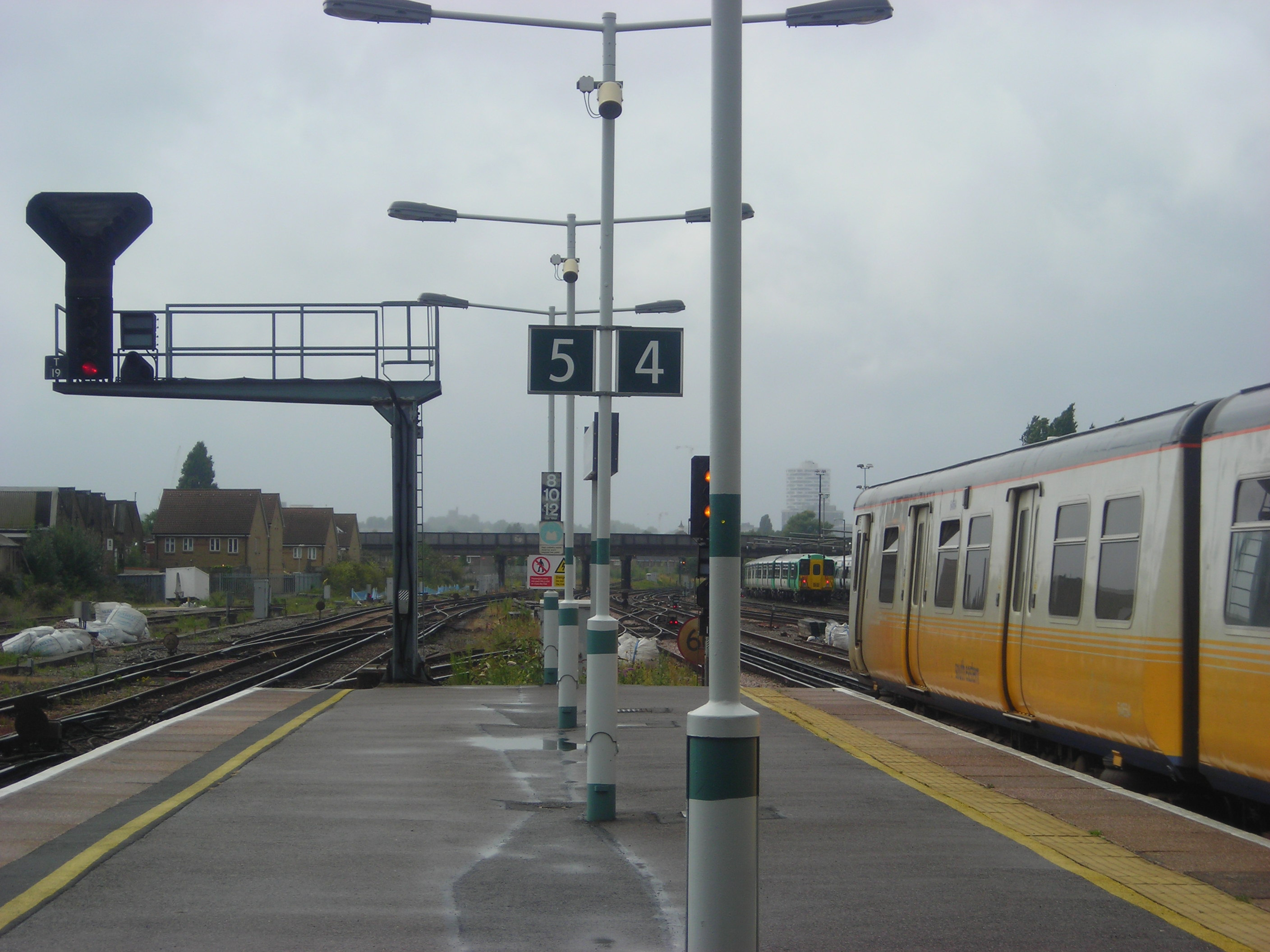
Platforms 4 & 5 (the bridge in the background was replaced in 2015)

=== Platform 4 ===
Platform 4 is mainly used for southbound trains terminating at Gatwick Airport. The platform serves both fast trains and stopping services, and is also mainly used by Thameslink.

=== Platform 5 ===
Platform 5 is mainly used for southbound trains terminating at West Croydon, Epsom and Sutton. Most trains stop at this platform and many travellers from London alight here. Services come from London Bridge, Highbury & Islington and London Victoria. The platform is used by both Southern and London Overground.

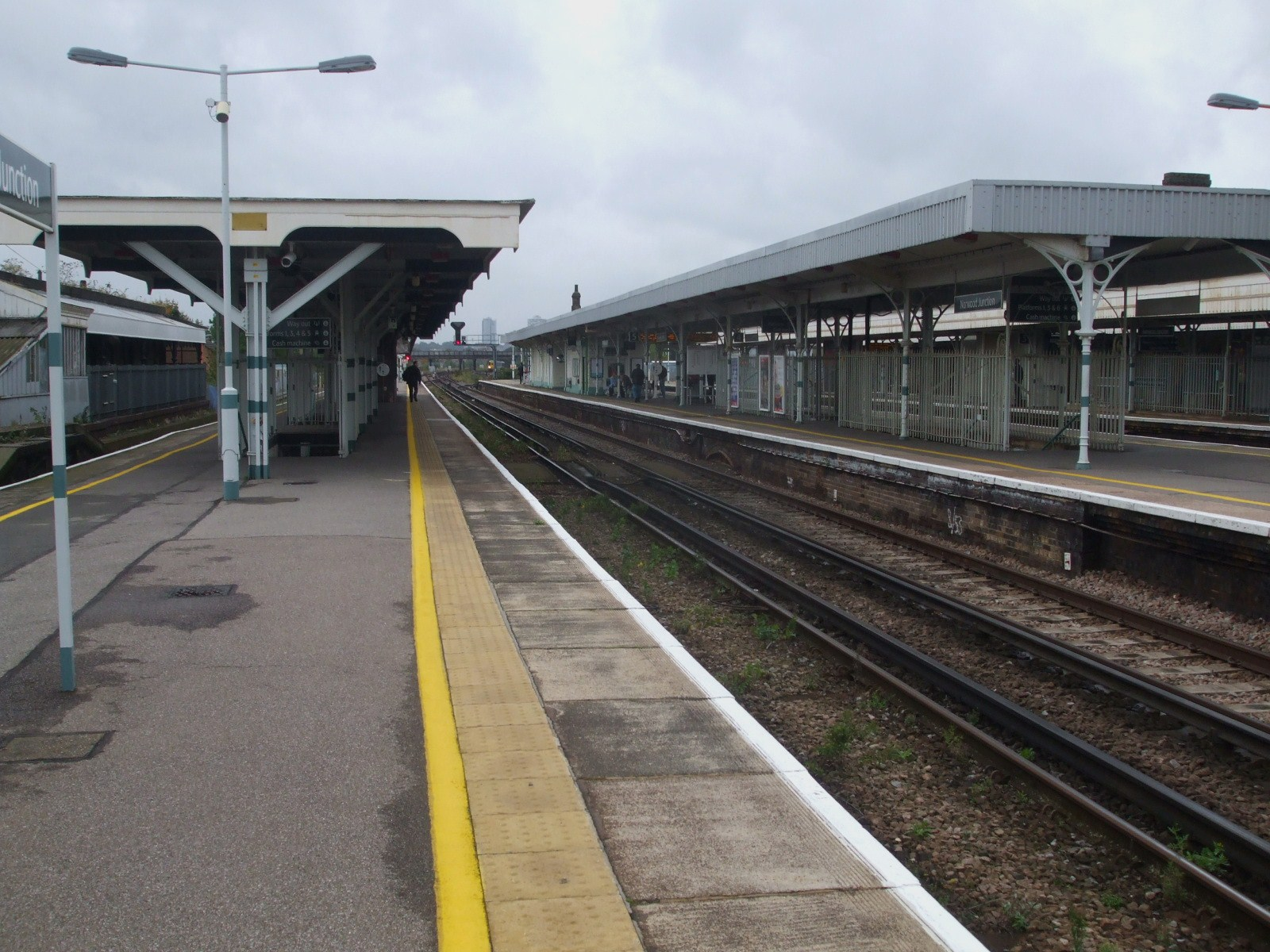
Platform 6 looking south when station was managed by Southern.

=== Platform 6 ===
Platform 6 is mainly used for southbound trains terminating at Coulsdon Town, West Croydon, Caterham and Tattenham Corner; it is also used for platform alterations. Trains come from London Victoria and London Bridge. Platform 6 is chiefly used by Southern.

=== Platform 7 ===
Platform 7 is disused and the line is covered by vegetation.

== Services ==
Norwood Junction is located on the Windrush line of the London Overground. Additional services are operated by Southern and Thameslink.

Southern

The typical off-peak service in trains per hour (tph) is:

- 4 tph to London Bridge (non-stop)
- 2 tph to London Victoria via Crystal Palace
- 2 tph to Epsom via Sutton
- 2 tph to Caterham and Tattenham Corner, dividing and attaching at Purley
- 2 tph to West Croydon

Thameslink

The typical off-peak service in trains per hour (tph) is:

- 2 tph to Bedford via London Bridge
- 2 tph to Three Bridges via Redhill

Windrush line (London Overground)

The typical off-peak service in trains per hour (tph) is:

- 4 tph to Highbury & Islington via Surrey Quays
- 4 tph to West Croydon

Preceding station	National Rail	Following station
London Bridge	Southern Brighton Main Line Stopping Services	East Croydon
Anerley Limited Service	Southern Brighton Main Line Stopping Services	East Croydon
Crystal Palace	Southern Crystal Palace Line	West Croydon
London Bridge	Southern Sutton & Mole Valley Lines	West Croydon
London Bridge	Thameslink Brighton Main Line	East Croydon
Preceding station	London Overground	Following station
Anerley towards Highbury & Islington	Windrush line East London line	West Croydon Terminus

== Marshalling yard ==
The LB&SCR constructed a large marshalling yard to the south of the station during the 1870s, extended in the early 1880s. At their height the yards on both sides of the line each had over 30 carriage roads. Because of the narrow nature of the site they were laid in clusters of six to eight, one beyond another, with the lead to each forming an individual headshunt. With dwindling freight traffic the yard fell into disuse by the 1980s and the tracks were relaid to accommodate an enlarged Selhurst Depot.

== Motive Power Depot/Norwood Cable Depot ==
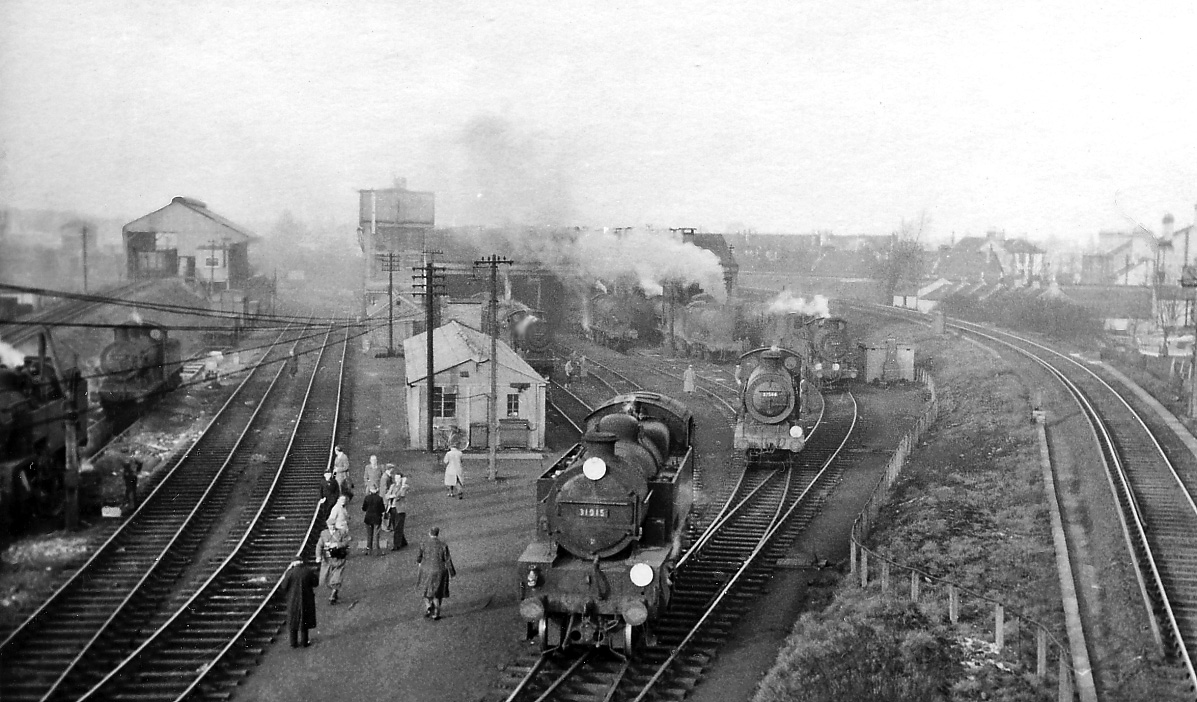
Norwood Junction Locomotive Depot on 12 March 1960.

The Southern Railway opened a five-road motive power depot with a 65 ft (19.8 metre) turntable in 1935, to serve the marshalling yard. It replaced a shed at West Croydon. This depot was closed in 1964 and demolished in 1966.

Following the demolition of the locomotive depot British Rail then redeveloped the site into a traction cable depot for maintaining the railway.

== Connections ==
Norwood Junction has three bus stops close by with day and nighttime services provided by London Buses, Arriva London, Metrobus and Transport UK London Bus.

== In literature ==
It is from this station that Jonas Oldacre takes his train to London Bridge in Arthur Conan Doyle's Sherlock Holmes story "The Adventure of the Norwood Builder" (1903).
