= Morden =

Coordinates: 51.4015°N 0.1949°W

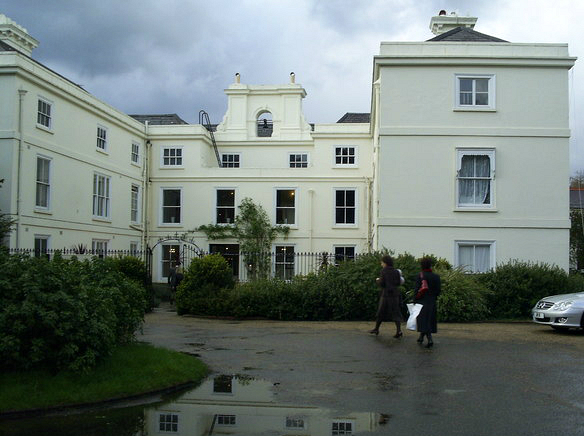
- Morden Hall

- Location within Greater London
- Population: 48,233 (2011)
- OS grid reference: TQ255685
- London borough: Merton
- Ceremonial county: Greater London
- Region: London
- Country: England
- Sovereign state: United Kingdom
- Post town: MORDEN
- Postcode district: SM4
- Post town: LONDON
- Postcode district: SW19, SW20
- Dialling code: 020
- Police: Metropolitan
- Fire: London
- Ambulance: London
- UK Parliament: Wimbledon; Mitcham and Morden
- London Assembly: Merton and Wandsworth

Morden is a district and town in South London, England, now within the London Borough of Merton, in the ceremonial county of Greater London. It adjoins Merton Park and Wimbledon to the north, Mitcham to the east, Sutton to the south and Worcester Park to the west, and is around 8 miles (13 km) south-southwest of Charing Cross. Prior to the creation of Greater London in 1965, for local government purposes, Morden was in the administrative and historic county of Surrey.

At the 2011 census, Morden had a population of 48,233, including the wards of Cannon Hill, Lower Morden, Merton Park, Ravensbury and St Helier.

The district of Morden includes the town itself, Lower Morden, Morden Park, Cannon Hill, Merton Park and parts of St Helier.

Morden Hall Park, a National Trust park on the banks of the River Wandle adjacent to the town centre, is a key feature of the area. The Baitul Futuh Mosque, completed in 2003, is the largest mosque in Western Europe.

== Origin of name ==
Previously recorded as Mordune, Mordone, Moreden and Moorden, the name is thought to derive from the Old English mōr and dūn, meaning "hill in marshy ground" in reference to its position on somewhat elevated land between the Beverley Brook and the River Wandle.

== History ==
=== Early history ===
Human activity in Morden dates back to the Iron Age period when Celtic tribes are known to have occupied areas around Wimbledon, but the first significant development in Morden was the construction of the Roman road called Stane Street from Chichester to London.

The route of Stane Street through Morden followed the current A24, London Road up Stonecot Hill from the south west crossing Morden Park to the west of the current dual carriageway road and passing through the pitch and putt golf course and the grounds of St Lawrence's Church. The road then descended the other side of the hill towards the town centre passing west of the Underground station and crossing the north corner of Morden Hall Park heading in the direction of Colliers Wood and Tooting. Small Roman artifacts, mainly coins and pottery, have been found at various locations within the area although there is no evidence of any settlement.

Ethelstan the Etheling, son of Ethelred the Unready, left "land at Mordune" to the abbey of Christ and St. Peter in his will of 1015, which became the site of the first Saxon parish church of St Lawrence.

In 1086, the Domesday Book recorded the manor as Mordone, part of Wallington Hundred. It was held by Westminster Abbey and its assets were: 3 hides; 1 mill worth £2 and 7 ploughs. It rendered £15 in total. Fourteen people were recorded as living in the area.

=== The Garth family ===
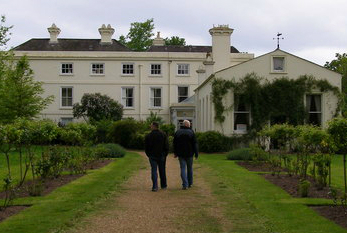
Morden Hall, home of the Garth family

The manor and village remained abbey property until the Dissolution of the Monasteries in Henry VIII's reign when the manor was sold to Lionel Ducket and Edward Whitchurch. Together, they sold it on the following year to Sir Richard Garth who became Lord of the manor. The Garth family owned the land and maintained their connection with the parish for the next four centuries, living at Morden Hall Park until the manor was sold by another Sir Richard Garth in 1872.

The prominence of the Garth family is recorded locally in the name of Garth Road, Lower Morden and the former Garth School. The two lions included in the present civic arms of the London Borough of Merton are adopted from the arms of Sir Richard.

=== 19th century ===
Morden's Population in the 19th Century
19th century		20th century	
1801	512	1901	960
1811	549	1911	1,202
1821	638	1921	1,355
1831	655	1931	12,618
1841	685	1941 (Note: no census was held due to war)	war
1851	628	1951	35,417
1861	654	1961 (Note: includes Merton)	68,011
1871	787	1971	62,872
1881	694	1981	61,108
1891	763	1991 (Note: census data no longer relates to parish boundaries)	n/a

Despite the rapid suburban development of nearby Wimbledon occasioned by the arrival of the new railways constructed in the mid 19th century, Morden remained a rural parish throughout the 19th century. While the population of Wimbledon grew hugely from 1,591 in 1801 to 41,652 in 1901, the population of Morden was 512 in 1801 and, one hundred years later, had grown to just 960.

In 1871, the area of the parish of Morden was 1,474.926 acres (596.881 ha) with the small village clustered around St Lawrence's church at the top of the hill on the road from London to Epsom (now London Road/Epsom Road). Approximately 1/2 mile (0.80 km) to the west of the main village and the grounds of Morden Park stood the hamlet of Lower Morden.

Close to the church were the George Inn, a 17th-century coaching inn (now modernised and part of a national pub restaurant chain), the estate of Morden Park and a school.

The other main public house in the village was the Crown Inn, located to the north east of the village with a small cluster of cottages on Crown Road. The rest of what is now the commercial centre of Morden was fields.

In the late 19th century the principal industry remained agriculture, although some industrial activity did exist along the River Wandle where watermills ground tobacco to snuff and a varnish works existed close to the site of Poplar Primary School. By 1898, the varnish works had gone and there was a brickworks on the site of Mostyn Gardens in Martin Way (then called Green Lane).

=== 20th century ===
Under the Local Government Act, 1894, the parish of Morden formed part of the Croydon Rural District of Surrey. The first two decades of the 20th century saw little change in the village, with industry still mainly agricultural in nature; however, development in the parish of Merton to the north led to that area being removed from the rural district to form the Merton Urban District in 1907. Morden was merged with the Merton Urban District in 1913 to form the Merton and Morden Urban District. It was not until 1926, when Morden Underground station opened as the terminus of a new extension (from Clapham Common) of the City & South London Railway (now part of the London Underground's Northern Line), that the fast and direct route to Central London opened up the village for residential development.

A map of Morden from the 1920s

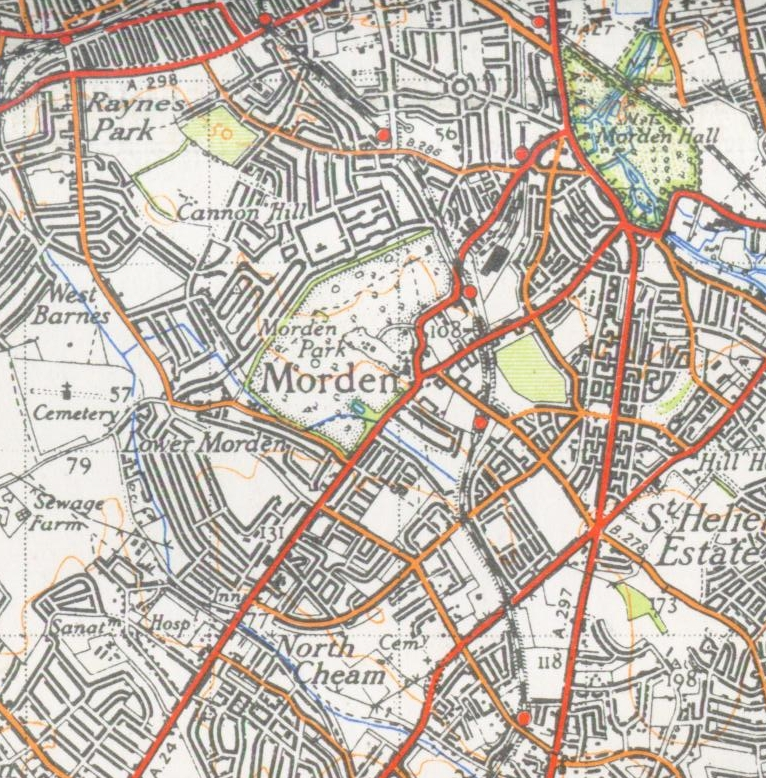
A map of Morden from 1944

To complement the new tube station, a garage was constructed on the other side of London Road, adjacent to the railway cutting and, in 1932, Morden Cinema was built next to it on the corner of Aberconway Road. Around the station, which, itself, had several shops built into the building, a new adjacent commercial centre grew quickly as shops sprang up along London Road and Crown Lane, including a rebuilt and enlarged Crown Inn public house (opened in 1932) and a large Royal Arsenal Co-operative Society (RACS) department store (opened in 1940).

Away from the new commercial centre of Morden, the existing rural roads were widened and rebuilt and the fields were rapidly divided into building plots and laid out for new housing. Further transport improvements came with the construction of a new Southern Railway branch line from Wimbledon to Sutton via stations at South Merton and Morden South (so named to differentiate it from Morden Underground Station and Morden Road (now Morden Road tram stop), although it was actually North-East of the original village centre). The new line opened between January 1930 and 1933. As a result of the new train and bus links, the population of Morden increased rapidly, from 1,355 in 1921 to 12,618 in 1931. In the next fifteen years, the population continued to grow, as most of the parish was covered in new suburban homes.

One of the main residential developments in the 1930s was the St. Helier Estate, built by the London County Council (LCC) to house workers from Inner London and named in honour of Lady St. Helier, an alderman of the LCC. The estate was, at the time, the largest local authority development in South London and has its road names arranged in alphabetical order, from the North-West corner (Abbotsbury Road) to the South-East corner (Woburn Road). Reflecting the previous ownership of the land by Westminster Abbey, all are named after religious establishments.

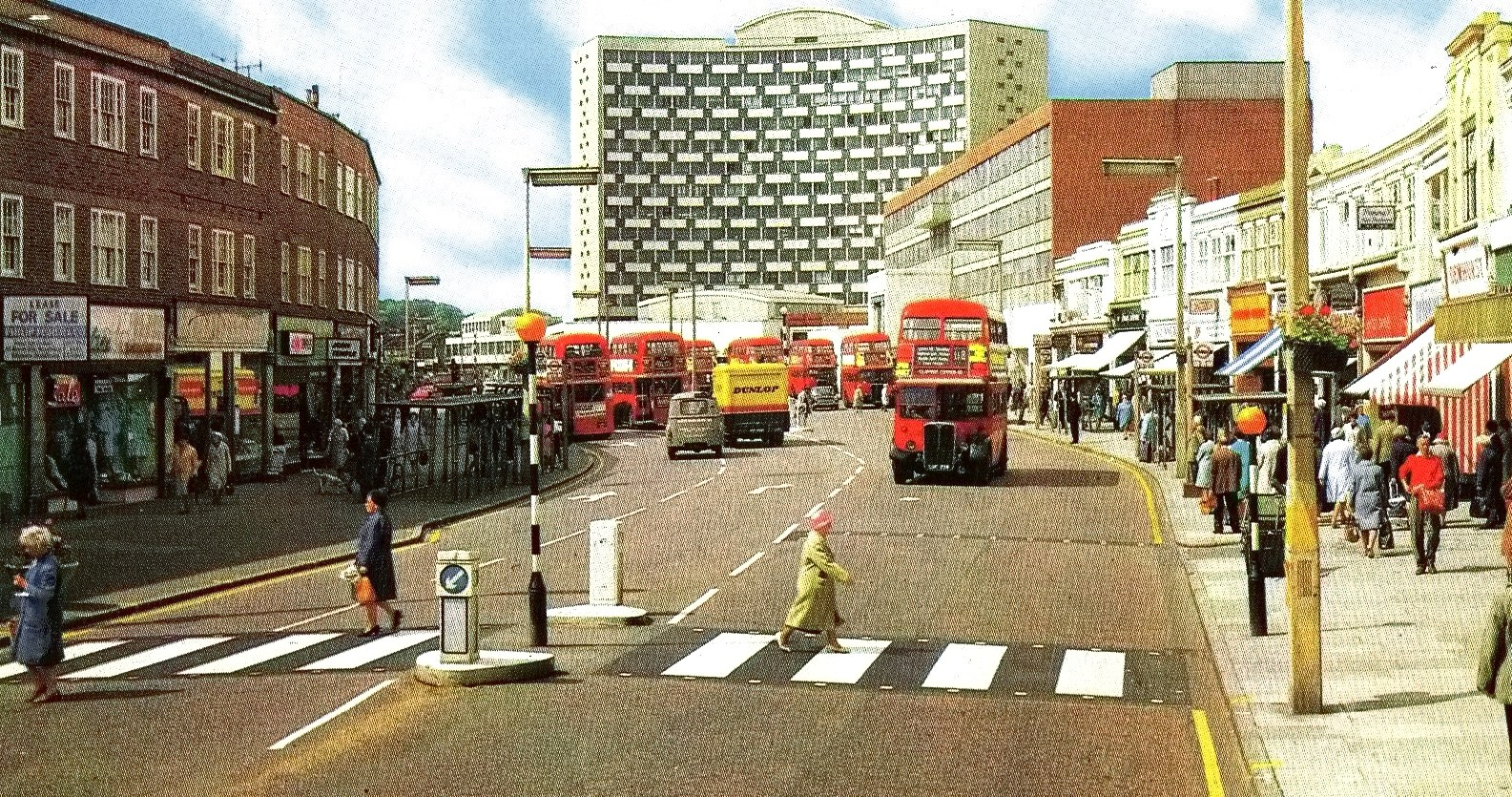
Morden in the 1960s

In 1943, the council was granted a civic coat-of-arms incorporating lions from the Garth family arms and the fret from the arms of Merton Priory. The motto, "In Libertate Vis", means "Our Strength is our Freedom". On 1 April 1965 the parish was abolished, under the London Government Act 1963, the Merton and Morden Urban District Council was also abolished and its area combined with that of the Municipal Borough of Wimbledon and the Municipal Borough of Mitcham to form the present-day London Borough of Merton. It then became part of London and not Surrey anymore. At the 1951 census (one of the last before the abolition of the parish), Morden had a population of 35,417.

=== Today ===
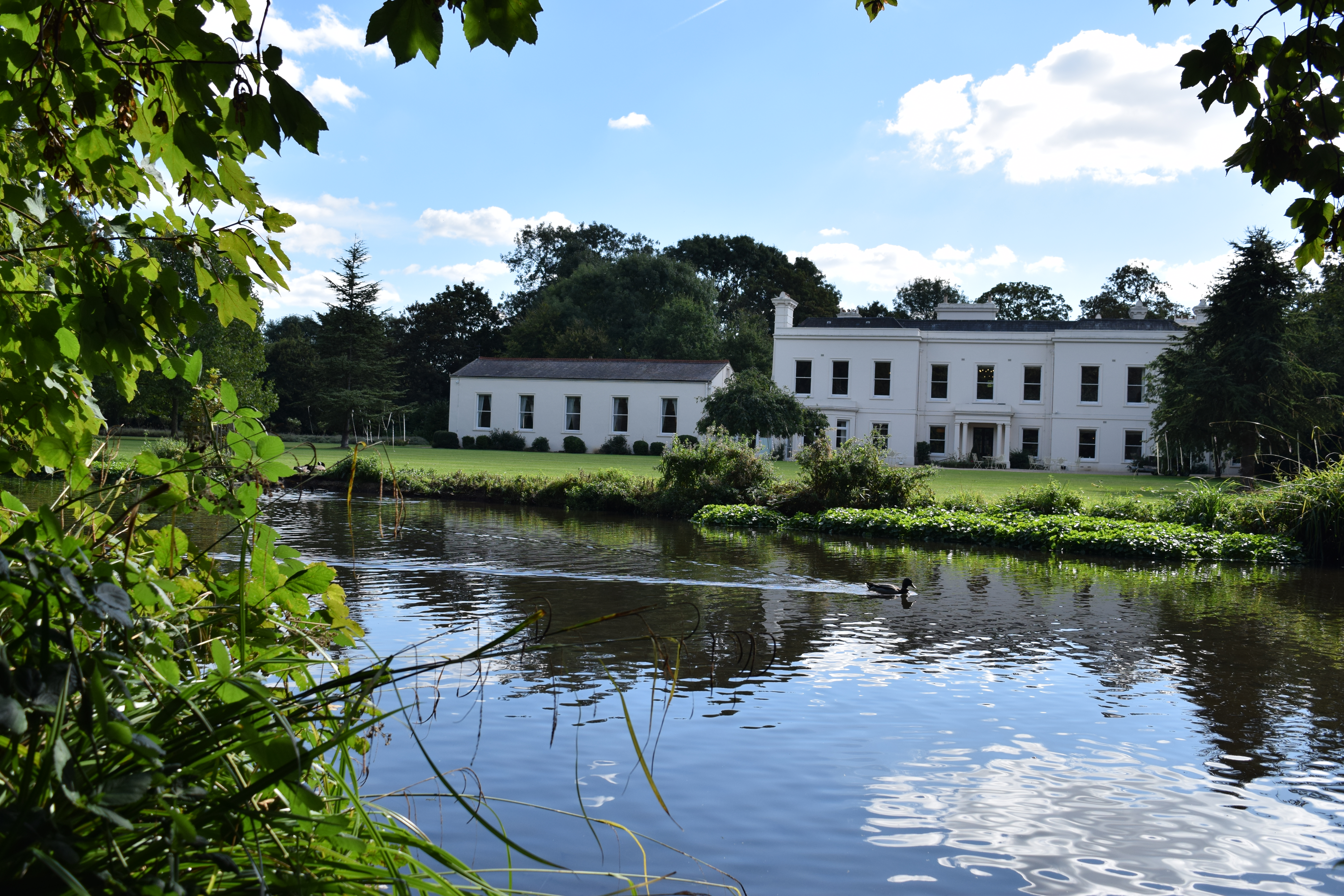
Morden Hall Park

Despite London's suburban expansion, a little of the earlier rural nature of Morden has survived; for instance several grand period buildings remain, especially within Morden's parks. The area retains a good provision of parks and green spaces, many of them created from former country estates. The 125-acre (51 ha) Morden Hall Park is of particular note and is run by the National Trust (see below). Its main entrance is only 0.25 miles (0.40 km) from Morden Underground Station.

The largest building in the town centre is Crown House, 14 storeys tall and built between 1960 and 1962. The concaved frontage of the building lends it some distinction, as does the "chessboard" style juxtaposition of its light and dark facade features. It incorporated The Crown public house, on which site part of the building covered. The building is home to Merton Civic Centre and a large adjoining library.

At around the same time, Morden Underground Station, originally a single storey building, with shops, had three-storey office accommodation incorporated above it.

A further office building with a large supermarket (now a Sainsbury's) at ground-floor level, was built in the 1980s in the centre of the town shopping centre. This replaced an equally large building housing the Royal Arsenal Co-operative Society.

The cinema and adjoining garage were demolished and replaced by shops some years ago.

== Landmarks ==
Morden plays host to a number of buildings and parks worthy of note including:

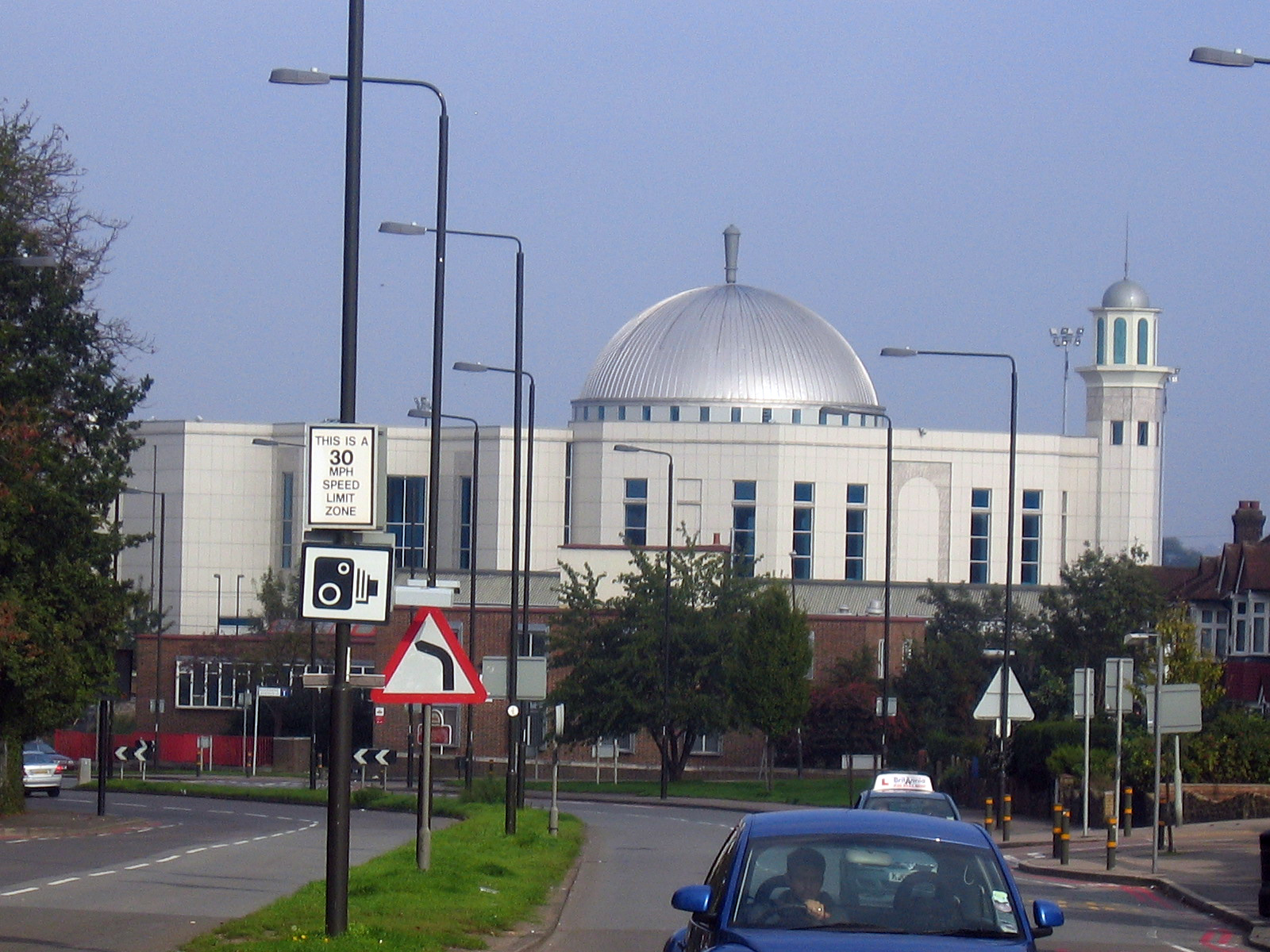
Baitul Futuh Mosque

- The Baitul Futuh Mosque, the largest mosque in Western Europe, built by the Ahmadiyya Muslim Community. Completed in 2003 at a cost of approximately £5.5 million, the mosque covers an area of 5.2 acres (21,000 m^{2}) and the full complex can accommodate up to 10,000 worshippers. It is located next to Morden South railway station and approximately 700 yards from Morden Underground station.
- Morden Hall Park is a key feature of the Morden area with large, period buildings located within its boundaries. It is a National Trust park, and is located on the banks of the River Wandle, near the town centre and few hundred yards from Morden Underground station. It covers over 120 acres (50 ha) of parkland with the River Wandle meandering through it spanned by numerous foot-bridges. The estate contains a number of historic buildings including Morden Hall itself, Morden Cottage and many old farm buildings, some of which are now a garden centre and a city farm. The rose garden has over 2,000 roses. The estate land was originally owned by Westminster Abbey. There is evidence of an earlier manor-house, but Morden Hall dates back to the 1770s and contains a variety of natural landscapes, including the parkland of the "Deer Park", meadow and marshland.

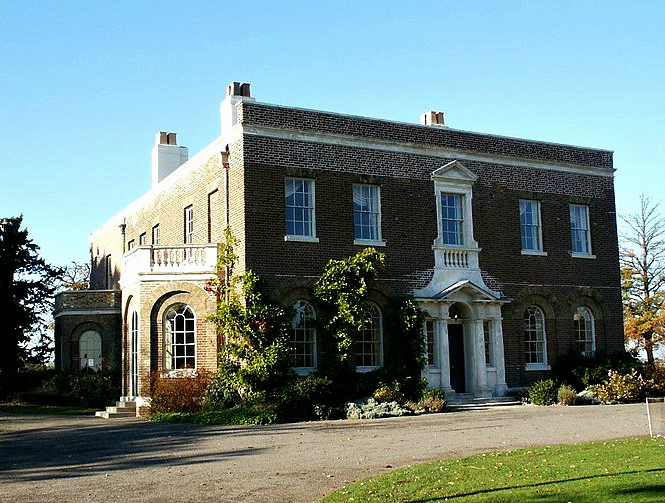
Morden Park House

- Morden Park, another park containing a period building of note. The park includes land that previously formed the grounds of Morden Park House, a small 18th-century country estate. The Georgian country house was built at the top of the hill in the 1770s for merchant and distiller John Ewart with attached landscaped gardens. Morden Park House now functions as the local registry office.

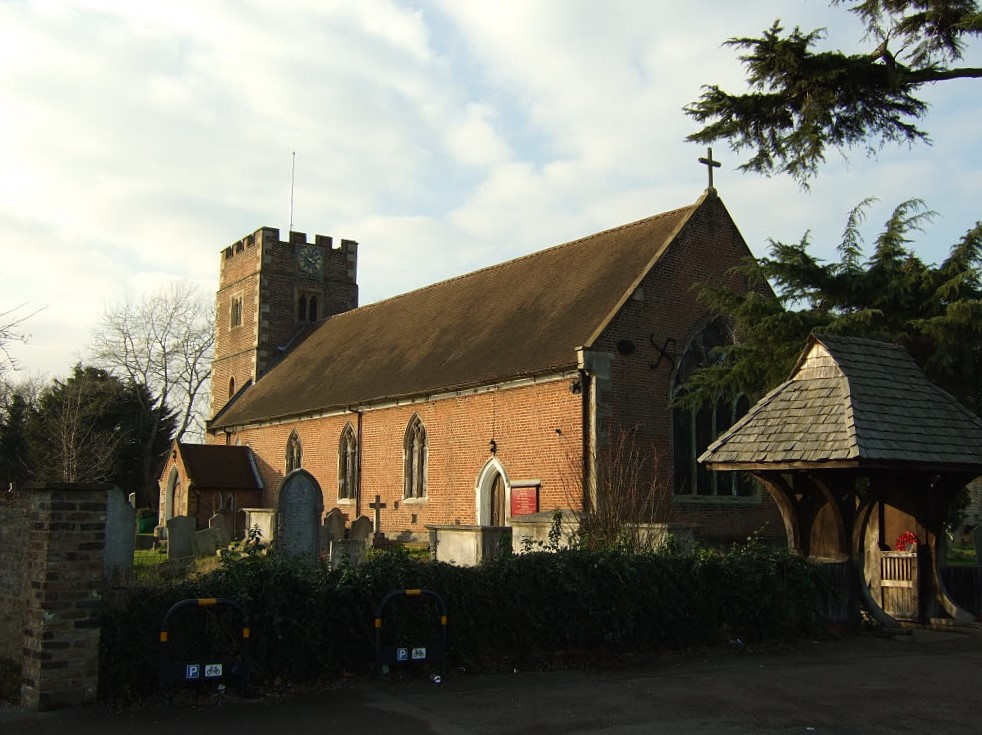
St Lawrence Church, Morden

- St Lawrence Church, Morden. St Lawrence Church is the Church of England parish church for Morden. The building is Grade I listed, and located on London Road, at the highest point of Morden, overlooking Morden Park. Located on the Garth family estate, the current church was built in the 1630s in the Protestant style, and replaced an earlier wooden one from the Saxon period.
- Morden Baptist Church, opened in 1935 to replace an earlier (1885) corrugated iron building. The Church stands with the main entrance facing up Crown Lane on the Morden one way system. In 1990 a very substantial building scheme was undertaken to provide the current improved facilities.

== Sport and Leisure ==
Morden has a Non-League football club Tooting & Mitcham United F.C. who play at Imperial Fields.

== Transport ==
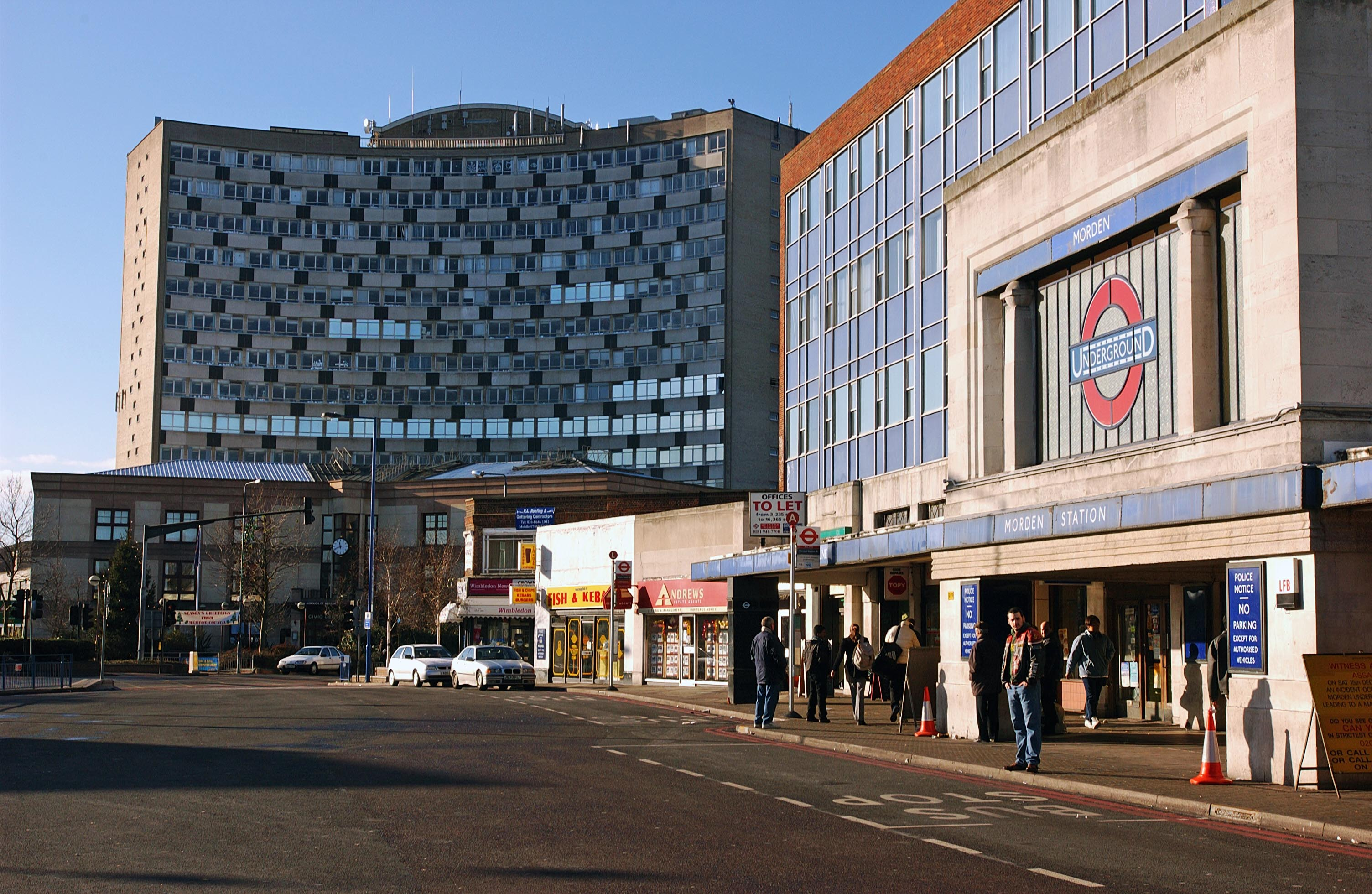
Morden Underground station with Merton Civic Centre in the background

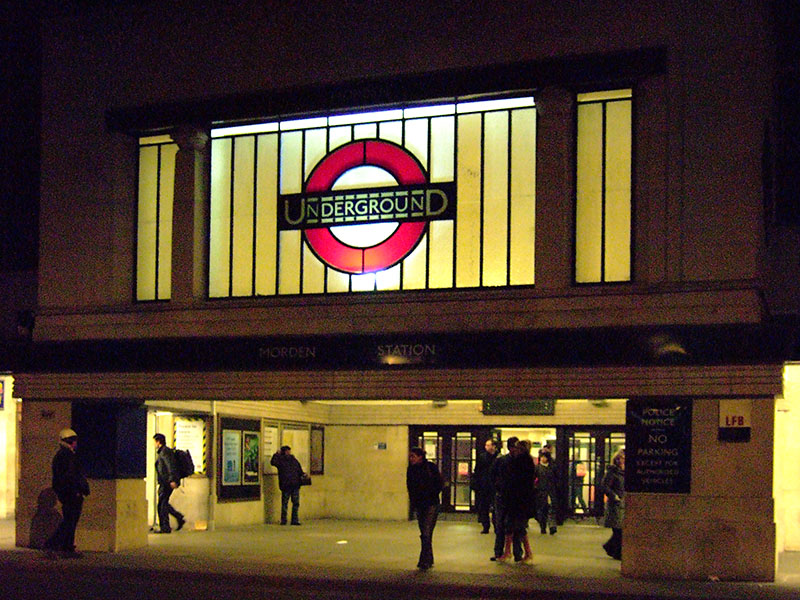
Morden Underground - main station entrance

Nearest tube station:

- Morden Underground station

Nearest railway stations and tramlink stops (in order of proximity):

- Morden South railway station
- Morden Road tram stop
- South Merton railway station
- St. Helier railway station
- Phipps Bridge tram stop
- Belgrave Walk tram stop
- Mitcham tram stop

The local day and night buses that serve Morden are:

- 45 - Morden – Camberwell
- 80 - Belmont High Down & Downview – Hackbridge Reynolds Close
- 93 - Putney Bridge – North Cheam (24 Hours)
- 154 - Morden – West Croydon
- 157 - Morden – Crystal Palace
- 163 - Wimbledon – Morden
- 164 - Wimbledon – Sutton
- 201 - Morden – Herne Hill
- 293 - Morden – Epsom General Hospital
- 413 - Morden – Sutton Bus Garage
- 470 - Sutton – Colliers Wood
- K5 - Morden – Ham
- N155 - Morden – Aldwych

== Notable people associated with Morden ==
- Mariot Arbuthnot – Commander of the Royal Navy in North America during the American War of Independence.
- Joseph Bazalgette – Engineer of London's sanitary system lived in the village for a few years in the 1870s.
- Richard Garth – Lord of the manor, Privy Counsellor and Chief Justice of Bengal
- Alexander Maconochie – Founder of the Royal Geographical Society and penal reformer.
- Good Shoes – an indie music band whose first album, Think Before You Speak, included the track "Morden"
- Sampha – a singer-songwriter best known for his collaborative work with SBTRKT, Jessie Ware and Drake.

== Nearest places ==
- Colliers Wood
- Cheam
- Hackbridge
- Merton Park
- Mitcham
- Lower Morden
- Motspur Park
- Raynes Park
- St. Helier
- South Wimbledon
- Sutton
- Sutton Common
- Tooting
- Wimbledon
- Worcester Park

== Gallery ==
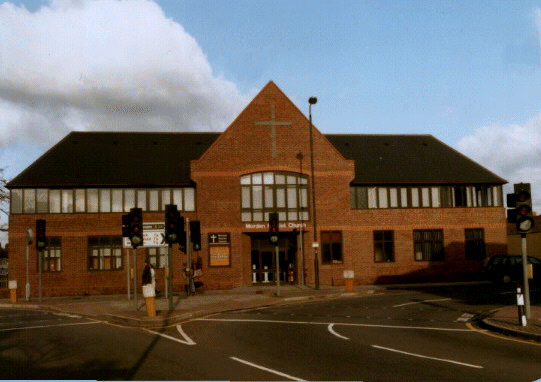
Morden Baptist Church, Crown Lane

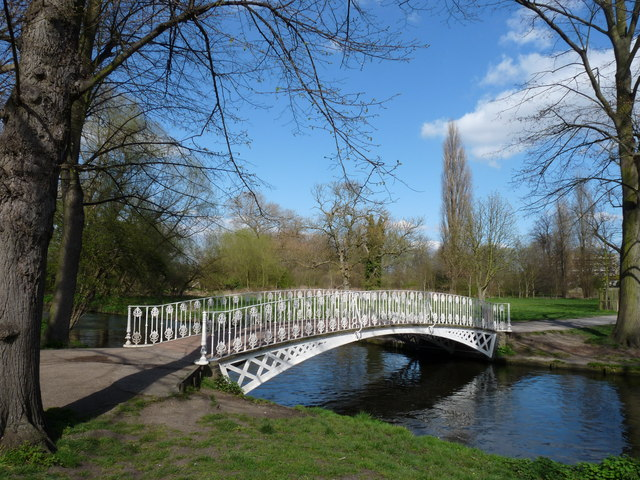
Bridge at Morden Hall Park

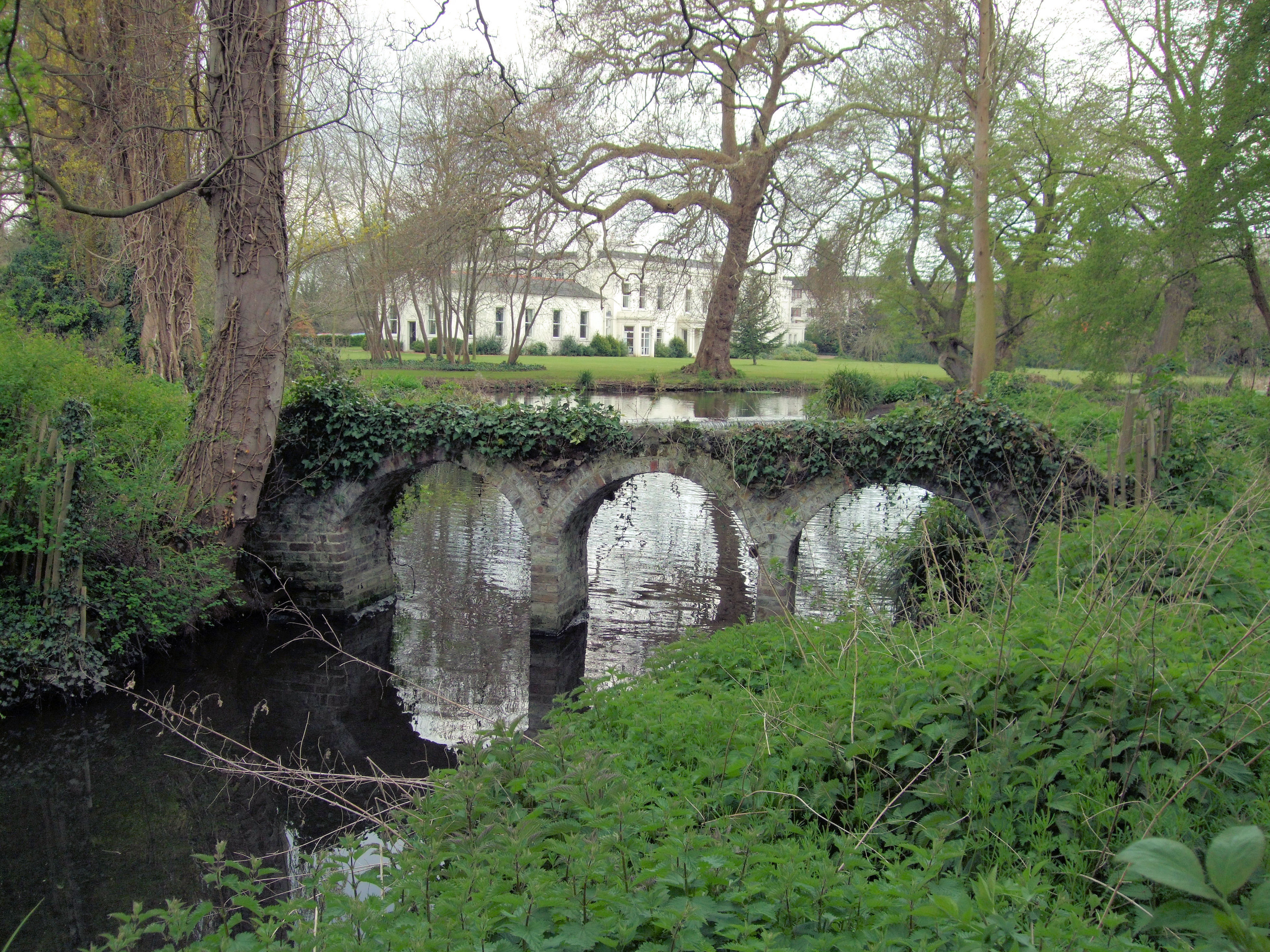
Morden Hall Park

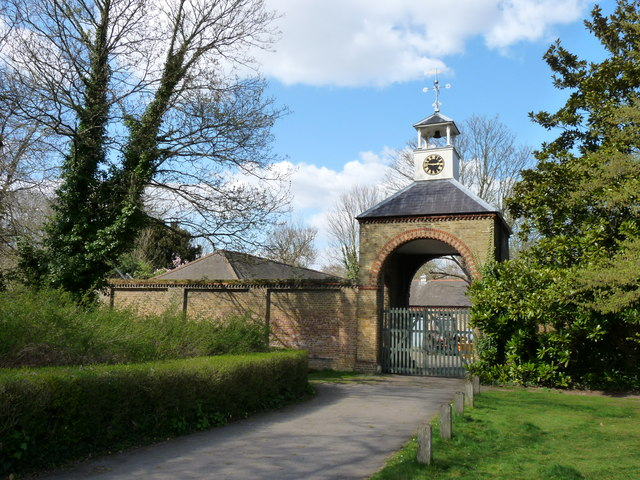
Stable Block at Morden Hall Park.

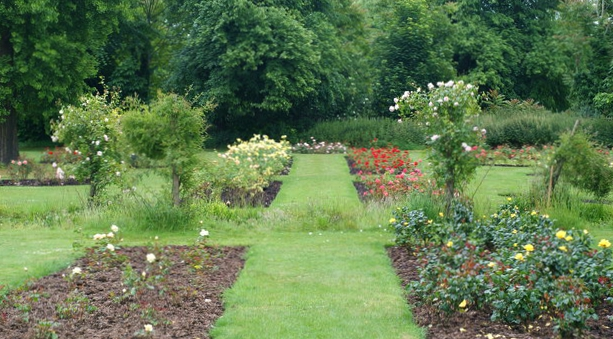
The Rose Garden, Morden Hall Park
