= St Lawrence Church, Morden =

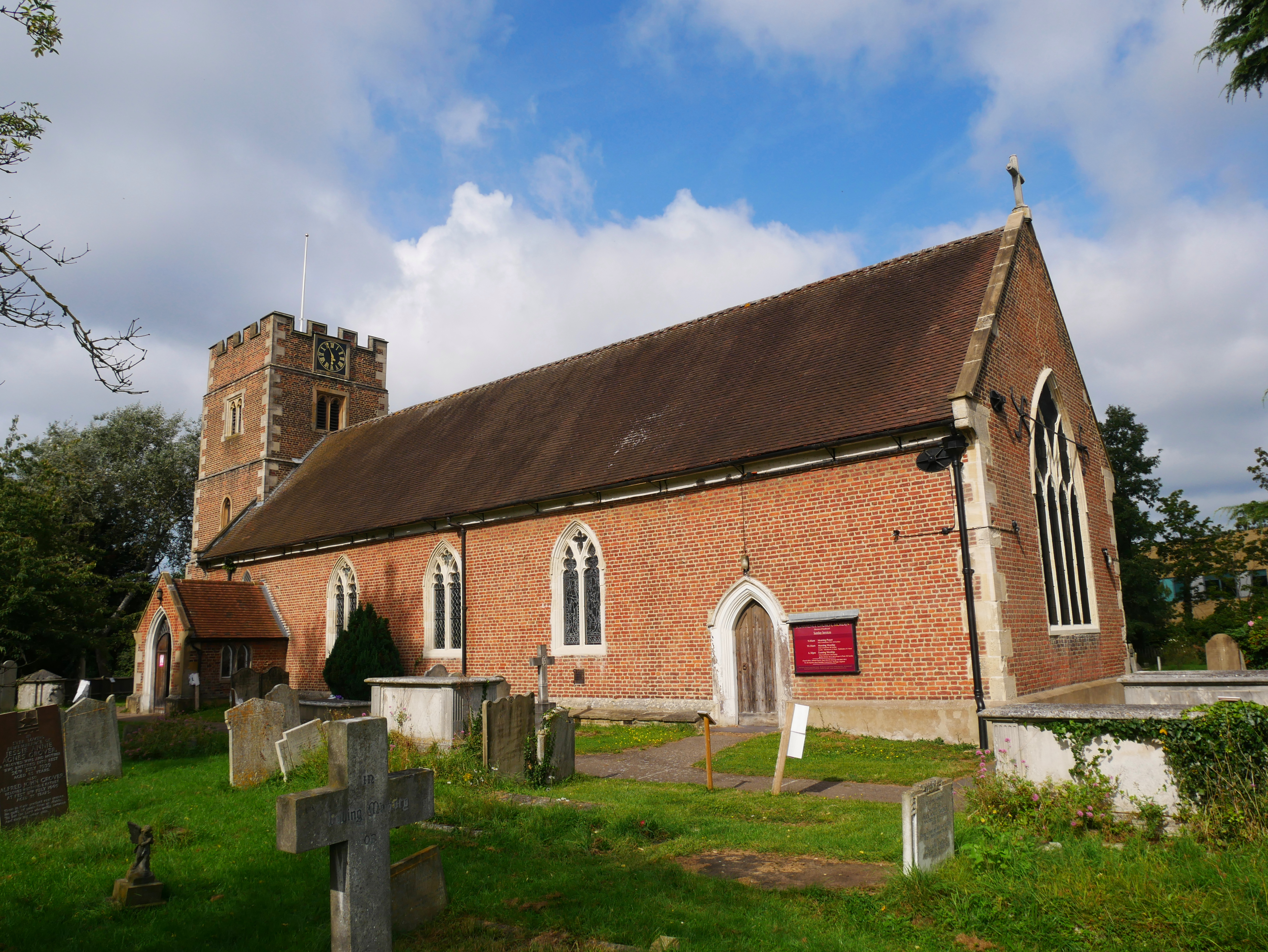
- St Lawrence Church, Morden
- 51°23′32.1″N 0°12′15.11″W
- Location: London Borough of Merton
- Country: England
- Denomination: Church of England
- Churchmanship: Evangelical Anglican
- Website: stlawrencechurch.co.uk

History
- Founder: Richard Garth

Architecture
- Years built: 1630s

Administration
- Diocese: Southwark
- Parish: Morden

Clergy
- Bishop: Richard Cheetham
- Rector: David Heath-Whyte

St Lawrence Church is the Church of England parish church for Morden in the London Borough of Merton. The building is Grade I listed, and located on London Road, at the highest point of Morden, overlooking Morden Park. Morden Parish consists of four churches in total, the other three are Emmanuel (Stonecot Hill), St Martin's (Lower Morden) and St George's (Central Road, Morden).

== Building ==
=== History ===
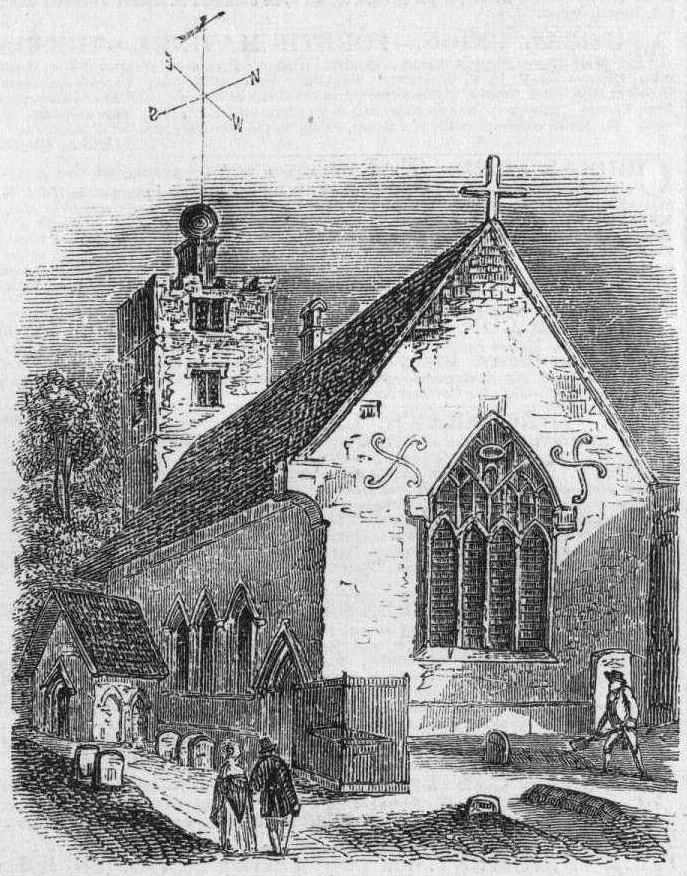
St Lawrence church, 1851

St Lawrence Church was built in 1636. It is probable that it replaced an earlier building. The nearby Merton Abbey was closed by Henry VIII as part of the Dissolution of the Monasteries and the estate sold. Edward Whitchurch and Lionel Dutchet purchased it, but left for Europe when Queen Mary came to the throne. The site then came into the ownership of the Garth family.

=== Exterior ===
The building is designed in Gothic style and features stone dressings and a red tiled, steeply pitched roof. The exterior is mainly of red brick. The church features an aisleless, 4-bay nave which has pointed, two-light windows. The nave continues into the short chancel. There is a square, 3 stage west tower and a projecting south west porch with a pointed arched and moulded doorway, later restored in 1887. The north vestry was added in 1805. There is a 'Y' tracery, cusped four-light east window with later perpendicular tracery.

=== Interior ===
The interior walls of St Lawrence are plastered and whitewashed. There are exposed tie beams and king posts under the circular shaped roof. The west gallery was added in 1792. There is an original stained and painted glass window to the east which features a design of Moses and Aaron, and various wall monuments. The interior features an inlaid timber pulpit, which originates from 1720 and has sounding-board over it for amplification. The tower houses three bells which, owing to restrictions placed by Historic England in order to preserve the frame, can only be tolled.

== Activities ==
There are services every Sunday at 9:00am, 10:30am, and 6:30pm. The 10:30am service has children's activities – the children join in the first part of the service before leaving for Sunday Club.

== Leadership and staff ==
- Revd David Heath-Whyte – Team Rector
- The Rt Revd Precious Omuku – honorary curate. Omuku is an assistant bishop in the Diocese of Southwark, having been consecrated bishop in South Sudan on 3 January 2016.
