= Malmesbury Primary School =

Malmesbury Primary School may refer to several schools in the United Kingdom:

- Malmesbury Church of England Primary School, Malmesbury, Wiltshire
- Malmesbury Primary School, Morden, Greater London
- Malmesbury Primary School, Tower Hamlets, London

== See also ==
- Malmesbury Park Primary School, Bournemouth, Dorset, United Kingdom
