= Morden Park (park) =

Park in London, England

Coordinates: 51.393°N 0.212°W

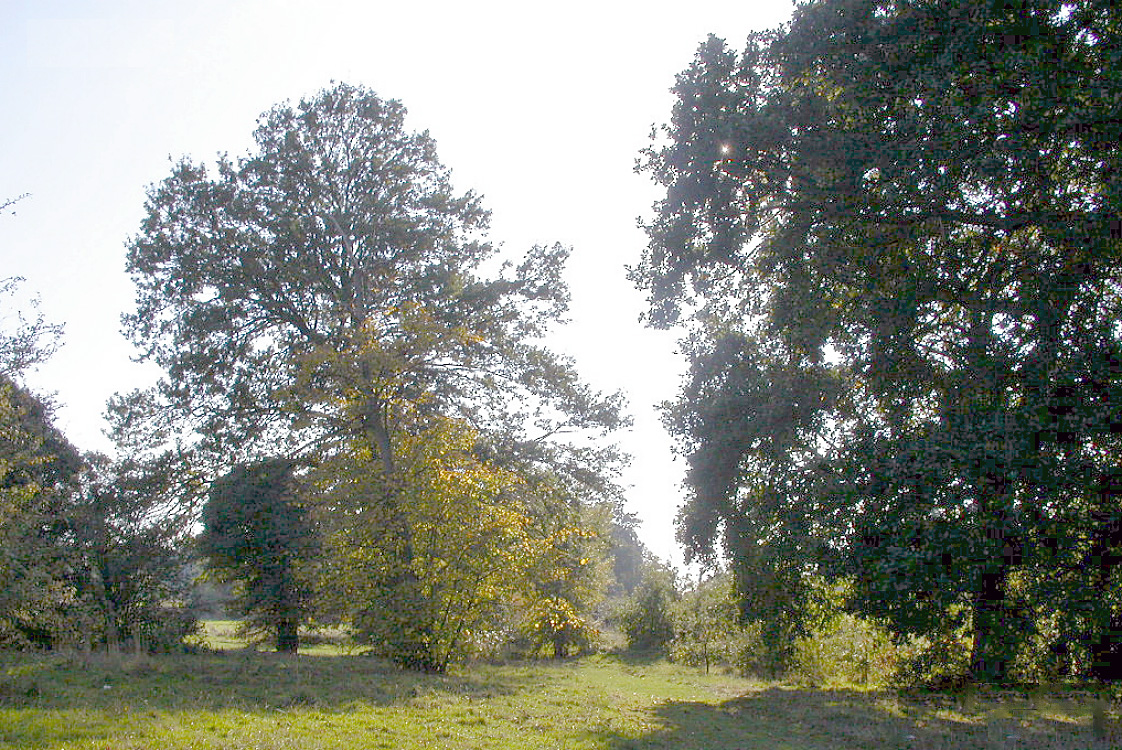
Trees in Morden Park

Morden Park is a 50-hectare (120-acre) public park and Site of Borough Importance for Nature Conservation, Grade 1, in the district of Morden Park in the London Borough of Merton. Of this, 28 hectares (69 acres) is a Local Nature Reserve. It is owned and managed by Merton Council. It includes Morden Park House (Registry Office).

== Landscape ==
The site includes the Morden Park mound, a Scheduled Ancient Monument, and Pyl Brook runs through.

== Biodiversity ==
Some oaks are over 300 years old, and bird species include green and great spotted woodpeckers, coal tits and spotted flycatchers. Grassland areas have wildflowers and a range of butterflies.

== Morden Park House ==
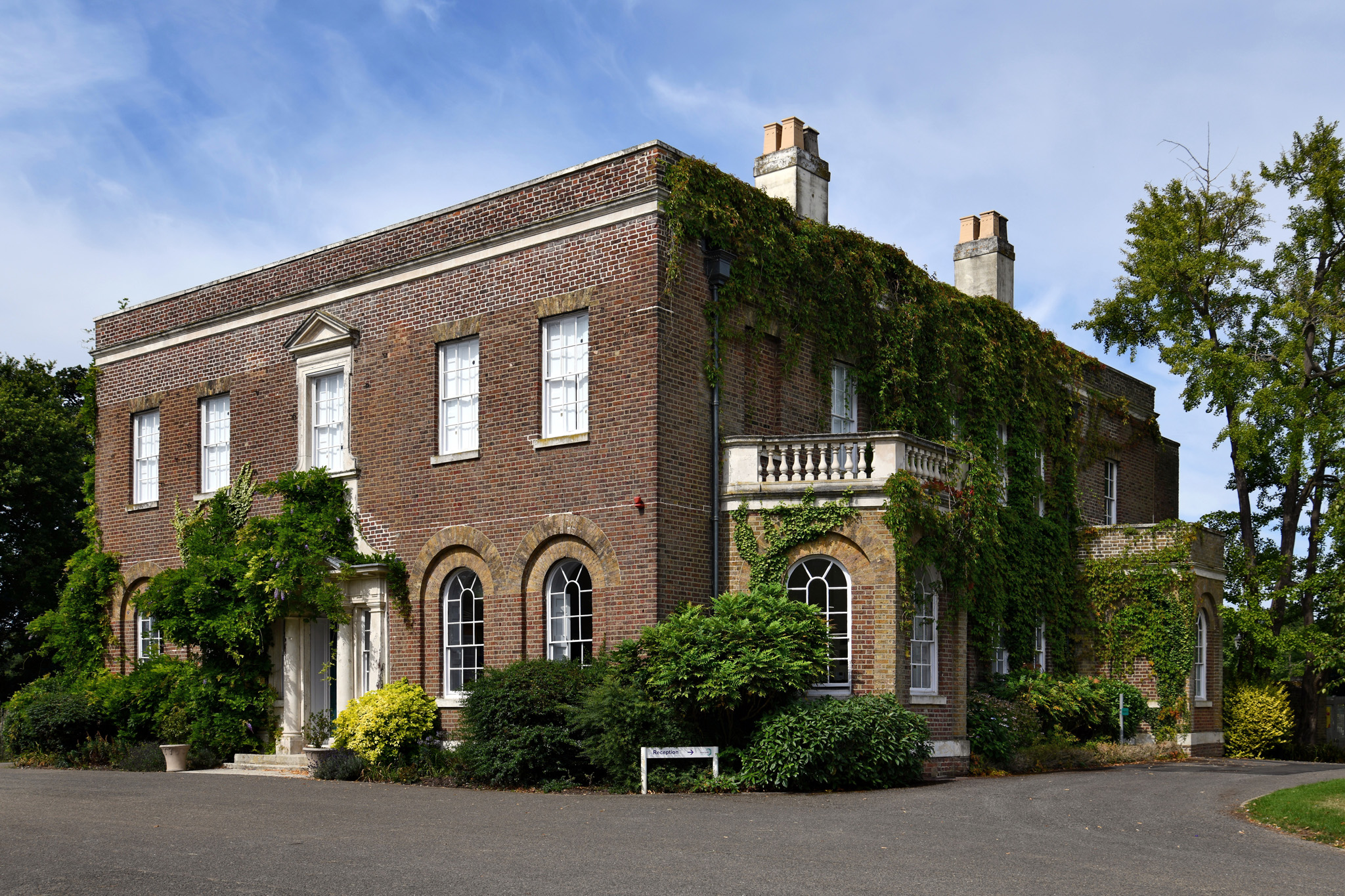
Morden Park House

The park remains the grounds of the eighteenth-century Morden Park House, in the initial category of listed building Grade II which is used as a registry office, specialising in weddings, having also reception event-hire space for those married in religious or other venues. In 1945 the house and park were purchased by Merton and Morden Urban District Council.

Access is from Epsom Road, Morden Lane and London Road.
