= Morden Park =

Coordinates: 51.3936°N 0.2052°W

- Location within Greater London
- OS grid reference: TQ248676
- London borough: Merton
- Ceremonial county: Greater London
- Region: London
- Country: England
- Sovereign state: United Kingdom
- Post town: MORDEN
- Postcode district: SM4
- Dialling code: 020
- Police: Metropolitan
- Fire: London
- Ambulance: London
- UK Parliament: Wimbledon; Mitcham and Morden
- London Assembly: Merton and Wandsworth

Morden Park is an area within the district of Morden in the London Borough of Merton, and includes the Park itself, an area of green space in an otherwise dense cluster of 1930s suburban housing.

The present park and sports fields between Hillcross Avenue, London Road/Epsom Road and Lower Morden Lane are owned and managed by the London Borough of Merton parks department and cover land that previously formed the grounds of Morden Park House, a small 18th-century country estate (not to be confused with Morden Hall Park, the National Trust property close to Morden town centre).

== History ==
The estate originally comprised enclosed parkland, a small Georgian country house built at the top of the hill in the 1770s for merchant and distiller John Ewart with attached landscaped gardens and a farm called Morden Park Farm. By the mid-1780s the estate was in the possession of the Polhill family. One member of the family, Edward Polhill, bequeathed £1,000 in 1826 to the parish church for the benefit of the Sunday school.

Between the 1880s and the 1910s the estate was occupied by banker John Wormald.

The entrance to the Park, from London Road is now dominated by South Thames College, Merton Campus. This was built on the site of a Pig Farm which was destroyed by fire at some point in the late 1940s or early 1950s. The derelict sites remained in place for some years until the early 1960s when clearing began for the College. During this period many bones could be found amongst the rubble; these have been assumed by archaeologists to be those of pigs. Children from the Council Estate opposite the entrance at Hatfield Mead used this area as an adventure playground for many years. At this period a Gatehouse (occupied until its demolition in the 1960s) was prominent at the entry.

Bordering the park to the South West, next to The George Inn was the RG Jones Recording Studios where a number of pop and rock groups in the 1960s (including The Rolling Stones) had recording sessions.

== Geography ==
At the bottom of the hill in the direction of Lower Morden runs a small brook.

A large circular mound in the park has been identified as a possible burial mound from the Iron Age, Roman or Saxon periods. Archaeological investigations were carried out in the 1950s although no conclusive proof as to its date or purpose were found. English Heritage believes that the earthwork was remodelled at some time into a belvedere, or viewing platform, with a spiral path to ascend it. Between 1960 and the mid-1990s a cycle speedway track sat alongside the mound, which was home to Morden Cycle Speedway Club. The track has since been demolished but it's still possible to find signs of the track's existence.

== Amenities ==
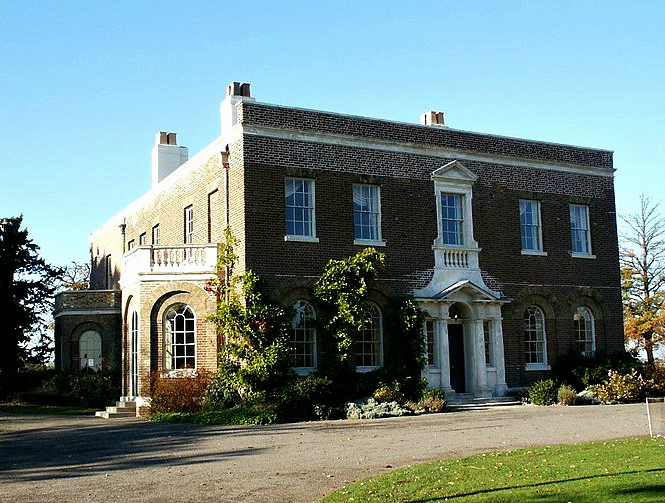
Morden Park House

Morden Park House remains and, after many years of neglect and semi-dereliction, has recently been restored and is now the local register office and a venue for wedding ceremonies.

== Maps ==
A map of Morden Park from the 1920s

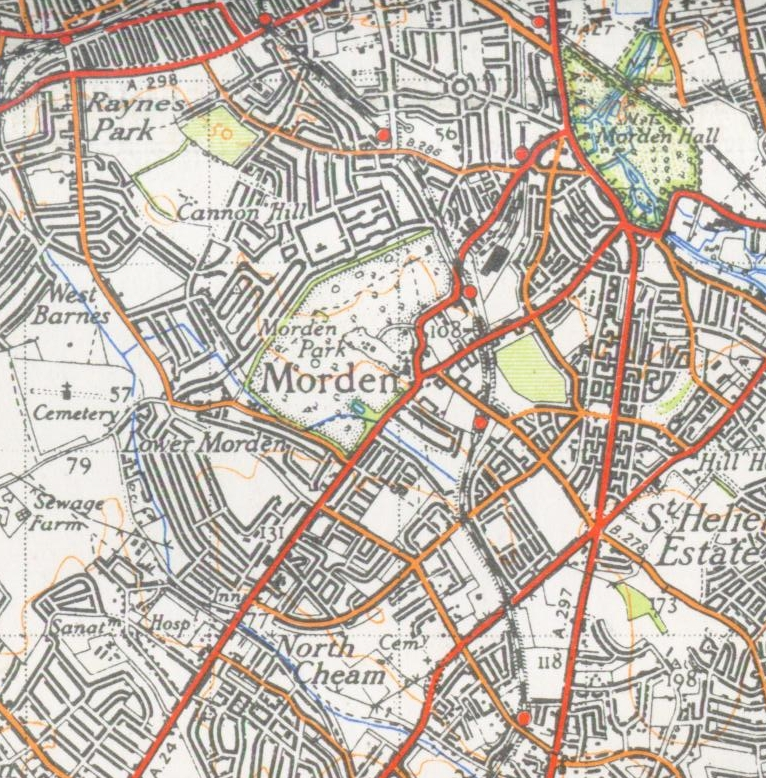
A map of Morden Park from 1944
