= Merton and Morden =

Merton and Morden may refer to several places:

- Merton and Morden Urban District
- Merton and Morden (UK Parliament constituency)
