= Merton Civic Centre =

Municipal building in London, England

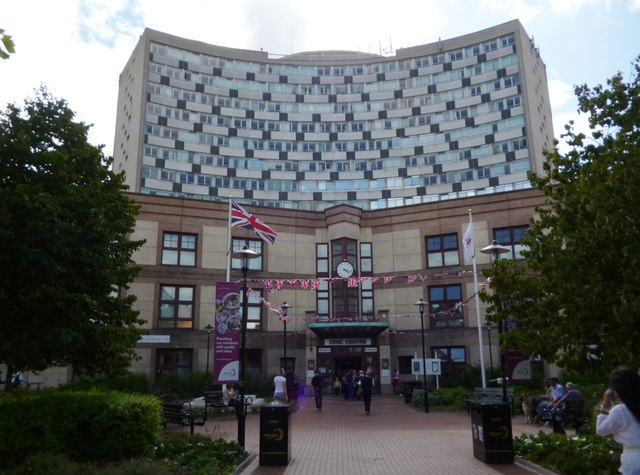
- Merton Civic Centre

- Shown in Merton
- 51.4013°N 0.1961°W
- Location: London Road, Morden

History
- Built: 1960

Site notes
- Architect: A. Green
- Architectural style: Modernist style

Merton Civic Centre is a municipal building in London Road, Morden, London. It is the headquarters of Merton London Borough Council.

== History ==
The main building was originally commissioned on a speculative basis by a developer, Bernard Sunley & Sons, for use as commercial offices and for postal sorting. The site selected had previously been occupied by a large post office and some other shops. As part of the site redevelopment a public house known as "The Crown", on an adjacent site to the east, was demolished and subsequently replaced with a supermarket.

The new building, which was designed by A. Green in the Modernist style, opened as "Crown House" in 1962. The design involved a 15-storey curved structure with layers of continuous concrete panels above and below a continuous row of glass windows on each floor: the whole structure was 49.4 metres (162 ft) high. Many of the council officers of the London Borough of Merton and their departments, which had previously been located at Wimbledon Town Hall, moved into the building in 1985.

After civic leaders decided to co-locate all their operations at Morden, and to use it as their meeting place as well, the adjacent site to the east which had previously been occupied by a supermarket was acquired for expansion. This expansion was implemented by the construction of a new three-storey block in front of the main structure: the design for the extension was more angular than the curved structure behind and involved a symmetrical frontage of seven bays facing onto the junction of Crown Lane and London Road; it featured a portico with a canopy on the ground floor and a tall oriel window stretching up from the first floor to second floor. This extension contained a council chamber and a public library enabling the expanded complex to become the new Civic Centre for Merton in 1990. A major programme of refurbishment works to replace all the windows in the main structure with aluminium double-glazing was completed in spring 2014.

The Merton Heritage & Local Studies Centre, which was established to exhibit aspects of the history and culture of the area, moved onto the first floor of the new library area in 2009. In 2015 the Merton Heritage & Local Studies Centre hosted a series of "War Story Days" to meet with residents and record their experiences from the First World War for a new project entitled "Carved in Stone", material from which was published on the centre's website. This was followed up with a "Heritage Discovery Day" in May 2017.
