= Lower Morden =

Coordinates: 51.3872°N 0.2209°W

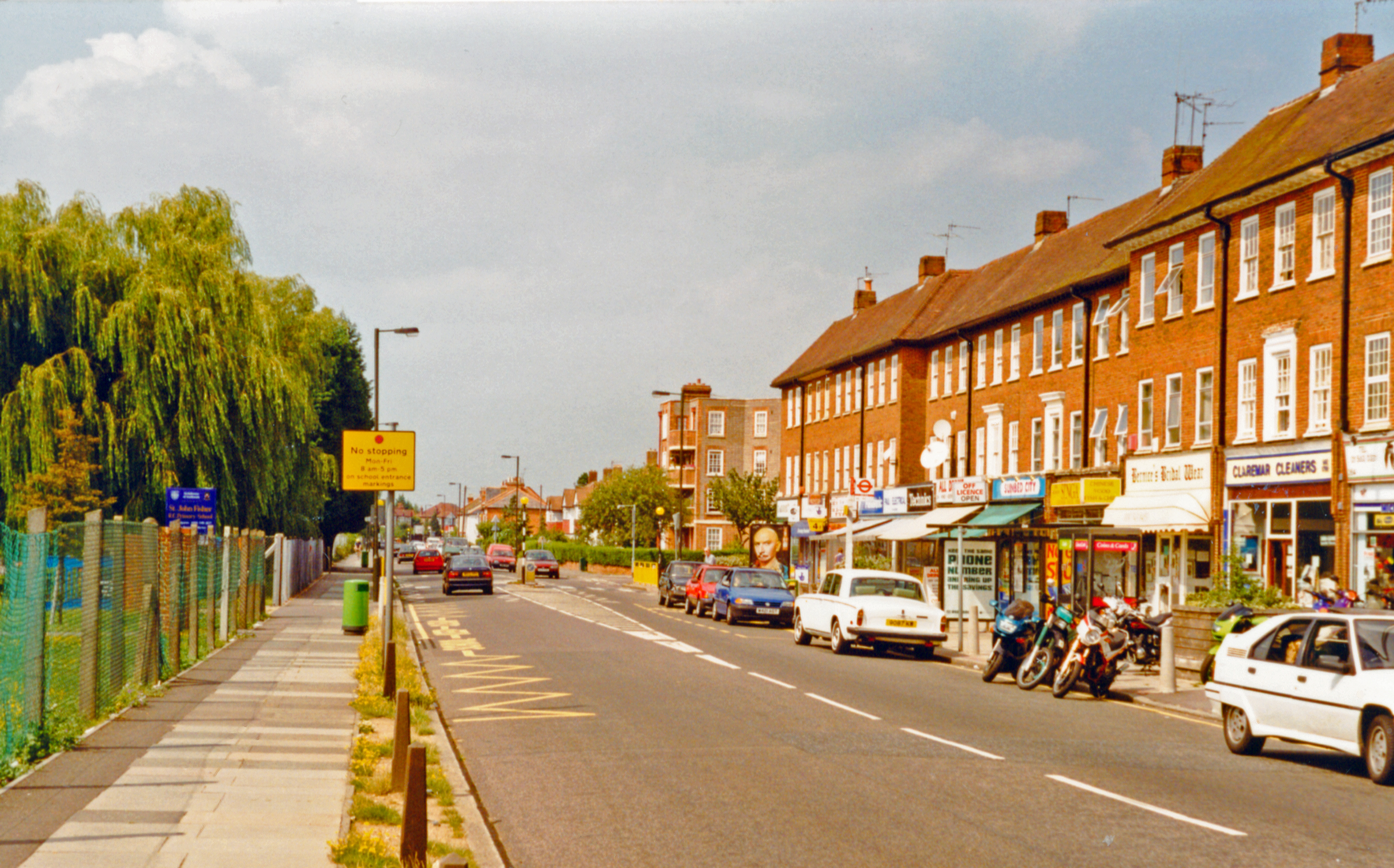
- Shops in Merton, Lower Morden, in 1997

- Location within Greater London
- Population: 9,090 (2011 Census. Ward)
- OS grid reference: TQ238670
- London borough: Merton
- Ceremonial county: Greater London
- Region: London
- Country: England
- Sovereign state: United Kingdom
- Post town: MORDEN
- Postcode district: SM4
- Post town: LONDON
- Postcode district: SW20
- Dialling code: 020
- Police: Metropolitan
- Fire: London
- Ambulance: London
- UK Parliament: Mitcham and Morden Wimbledon
- London Assembly: Merton and Wandsworth

Lower Morden is an area within the district of Morden in south west corner of the London Borough of Merton, to the west of Morden Park and south of Raynes Park.

== History ==
Until it was absorbed by the suburban expansion of the 1930s, the hamlet of Lower Morden was a small rural farming community within the parish of Morden approximately half a mile to the west of the main village situated at the top of the hill. Lower Morden had grown up around the village green and the Beverley and Pyl Brooks.

In the 1870s, the main properties of Lower Morden were Morden Farm (close to the modern school of the same name and on the site of Hatfeild School), Peacock Farm (now covered by Cranmer Close and Cardinal Avenue) and Hobalds Farm. Close by was Morden Common.

Today nothing of the original hamlet remains except perhaps a few ancient trees and old field boundary lines followed by the alignments of the roads that were to replace them. The first major development was the establishment in 1891 of Battersea New Cemetery (now Morden Cemetery) on land adjacent to Hobalds Farm to the north of Green Lane. The loss of Morden Common followed, its area now occupied by the Merton & Sutton Joint Cemetery and the Garth Road Industrial Estate. Garth Road is named after the Garth family, Lords of the Manor from the mid 16th century to the late 19th century.

Up to the Second World War the marshy land either side of the Pyl Brook now used as playing fields was cow pasture. The majority of residential development took place in the late 1930s with mock Tudor style houses being built between Morden Park and Stonecot Hill and north between Grand Drive, Hillcross Avenue and Cannon Hill Lane.

A map of Lower Morden from the 1920s

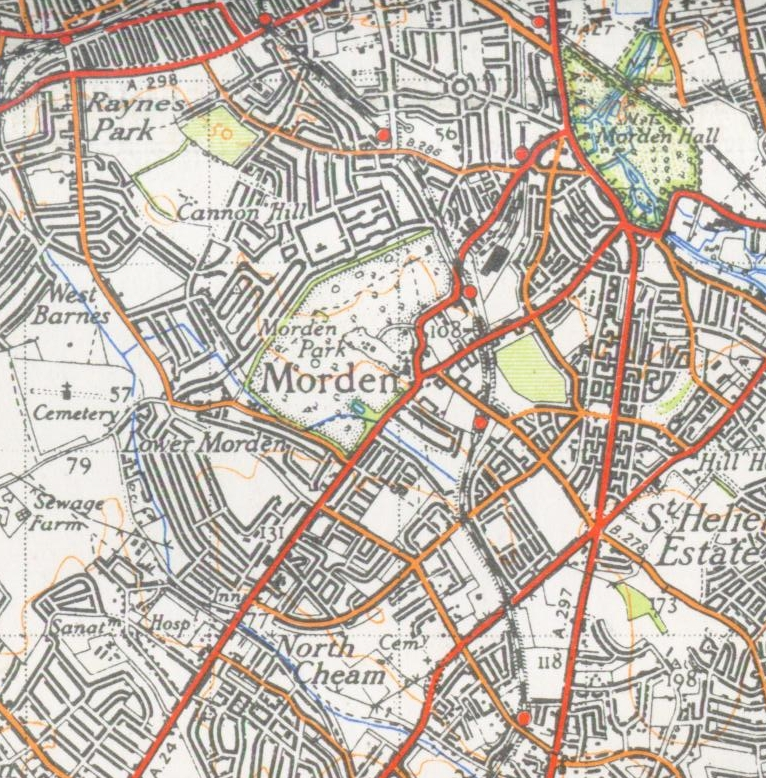
A map of Lower Morden from 1944

== Demography ==
The Lower Morden ward had one of the lowest crime rates in Greater London in the 2014/15 period.

== Sport and recreation ==
Lower Morden has a King George's Field in memorial to King George V.

== Governance ==
Lower Morden is part of the Mitcham and Morden constituency for elections to the House of Commons of the United Kingdom.

Lower Morden is part of the Lower Morden ward for elections to Merton London Borough Council.
