= Belgrave Walk tram stop =

Tramlink tram stop in London, England

Belgrave Walk
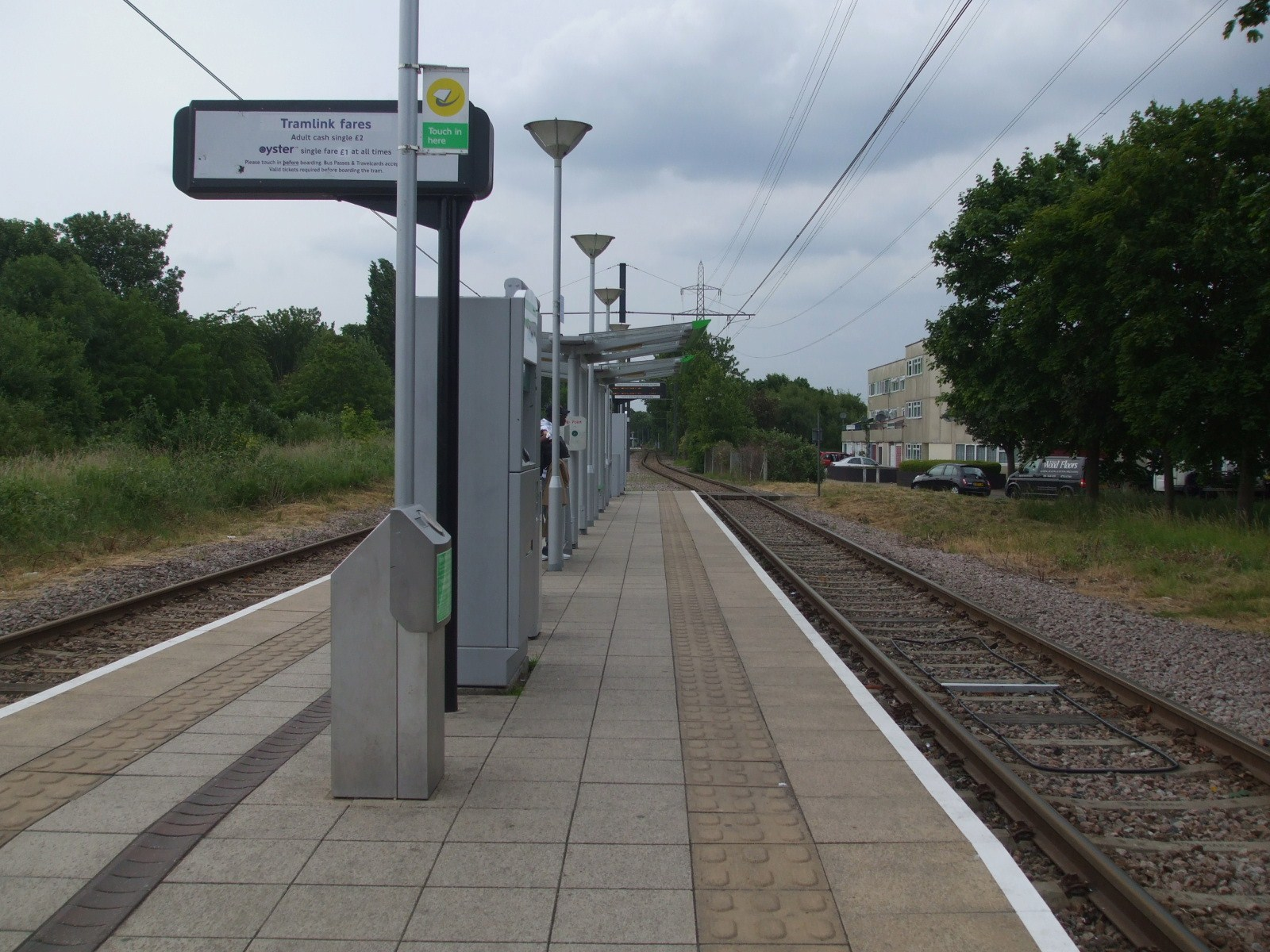
- Looking west

General information
- Location: Mitcham, Merton
- Coordinates: 51.400979°N 0.178458°W
- Operated by: Tramlink
- Platforms: 2

Construction
- Structure type: At-grade
- Accessible: Yes

Other information
- Status: Unstaffed
- Website: Official website

History
- Opened: 30 May 2000
Location
- Location in Merton

Belgrave Walk tram stop is a stop on the Tramlink service near Mitcham in the London Borough of Merton. The stop is named after Belgrave Walk, an adjacent residential street to the north.

The tram stop consists of an island platform which is accessed by pedestrian level crossings at both ends of the platform. The crossing at the western end only serves the north side of the line, whilst the one at the eastern end forms a path connecting neighbourhoods on either side of the line. The Phipps Bridge tram stop is clearly visible to the west.

== Services ==
The typical off-peak service in trams per hour from Belgrave Walk is:

- 6 tph in each direction between Beckenham Junction and Wimbledon
- 6 tph in each direction between Elmers End and Wimbledon

Services are operated using Bombardier CR4000 and Stadler Variobahn model low-floor trams.

| Preceding station | Tramlink | Following station |
|---|---|---|
| Phipps Bridge towards Wimbledon | Tramlink; Wimbledon to Beckenham Junction | Mitcham towards Beckenham Junction |
| Phipps Bridge towards Wimbledon | Tramlink; Wimbledon to Elmers End | Mitcham towards Elmers End |

== Connections ==
London Buses route 201 serves the tram stop.

Free interchange for journeys made within an hour is available between trams and buses as part of Transport for London's Hopper Fare.

== Future ==
Belgrave Walk is proposed to be a stop on the planned and currently paused Sutton Link tram extension between Sutton and Colliers Wood Underground, which would integrate the Northern Line into the existing tram network. The Sutton Link aims to create a new tram or BRT (bus rapid transit) system, providing a rail interchange in Sutton.

In 2018, Transport for London (TfL) proposed three routes for the Sutton Link, targeting South Wimbledon, Colliers Wood, and Wimbledon. In February 2020, TfL approved the route to Colliers Wood. According to a now-deleted consultation, the Sutton Link was expected to reduce public transport journey times from Sutton town centre to Colliers Wood by up to 18 minutes (a 50% reduction) and could accommodate approximately 2,200 passengers per hour. However, the project was paused later in 2020 due to funding challenges arising from the COVID-19 pandemic.

Colliers Wood to Sutton (Proposed Route 2)
- Terminus: Sutton
- Belgrave Walk (Access to Croydon / Wimbledon Tram Change)
- Colliers Wood (Access to Northern Line)

Then back to Sutton
