= Merton and Morden Urban District =

Former local government area in the UK

Coordinates: 51°24′N 0°12′W

Merton (1907–1913) Merton and Morden (1913–1965)
- Area
  - 1911: 1,762 acres
  - 1931: 3,237 acres
  - 1961: 3,233 acres
- Population
  - 1911: 12,938
  - 1931: 41,227
  - 1961: 68,011
- Density
  - 1911: 7.3/acre
  - 1931: 12.7/acre
  - 1961: 21.0/acre
- History
  - Origin: Merton (parish)
  - Created: 1907
  - Abolished: 1965
  - Succeeded by: London Borough of Merton
- Status: Urban district
- Government: Merton Urban District Council (1907–1913); Merton and Morden Urban District Council (1913–1965)
  - HQ: Morden Hall (after World War II)
  - Motto: In Libertate Vis (Our strength is our freedom)
- Coat of arms granted in 1943
- Subdivisions
  - Type: Civil parishes
  - Units: Merton (1907–1965); Morden (1913–1965)

Merton Urban District (1907–1913) and Merton and Morden Urban District (1913–1965) was an urban district in Surrey, England. It was formed in 1907 from the parish of Merton and was expanded in 1913 to take in Morden. The district was abolished in 1965 and its former area now forms part of the London Borough of Merton in Greater London.

== History ==
The district was created in 1907 to cover the ancient parish of Merton. Since 1894 the parish had been part of Croydon Rural District and was locally governed by a parish council, that was created by the Local Government Act 1894. The area of the rural district was within the expanding area of London's southern suburbs and as the population increased it became necessary to reform the local government structures.

Merton was the first parish to be removed from the rural district in 1907. An urban district was formed covering the same area as the parish. In 1913 the parish of Morden was also removed from the rural district and became part of the urban district, which was renamed to Merton and Morden. The separate parishes continued with nominal existence. The boundaries of the district were subject to a minor revision in 1933.

The urban district was abolished in 1965 by the London Government Act 1963 and its area merged with those of the Municipal Borough of Wimbledon and the Municipal Borough of Mitcham to form the London Borough of Merton of Greater London.

== Population ==
The population is separately recorded for each parish until 1951. The population peak was in 1951.

Year	1911	1921	1931	1941	1951	1961
Merton parish	12,938	16,177	16,177	war	39,313	
Morden parish	n/a	1,202	12,618	war	35,417	
Urban district total	12,938	17,532	41,227	war	74,730	68,011

== Coat of arms ==
In 1943, the council was granted a civic coat of arms incorporating Lions from the Garth Family arms and the fret from the arms of Merton Abbey. The motto, "In Libertate Vis", means "Our Strength is our Freedom".
