= Mitcham tram stop =

Tramlink tram stop in London, England

Mitcham
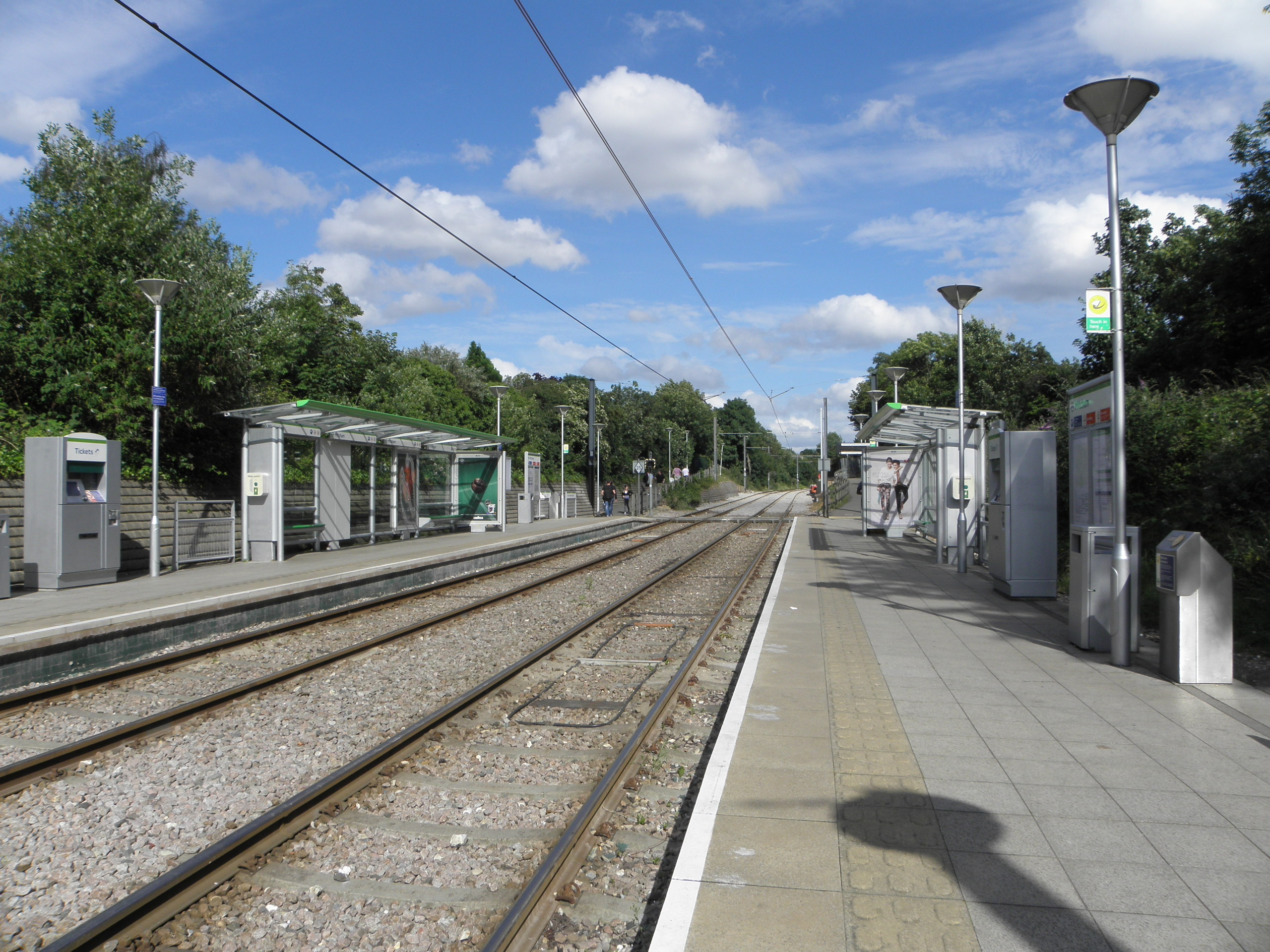

General information
- Location: Mitcham, Merton
- Coordinates: 51.397539°N 0.171125°W
- Operated by: Tramlink
- Platforms: 2

Construction
- Structure type: At-grade
- Accessible: Yes

Other information
- Status: Unstaffed
- Website: Official website

History
- Opened: 30 May 2000
Location
- Location in Merton

Mitcham tram stop is a Tramlink stop in Mitcham in the London Borough of Merton.

== History ==
=== Double line track ===
In late June 2012 a double line track was opened from Mitcham to Mitcham Junction, save for a short stretch of single track immediately to the west of Mitcham Junction due to the limited clearance under the road bridge. The track layout allows two trams to travel between the stations at the same time. Work laying the new track and installing the new OHLE (over head line) cables began in spring 2012. The job took about three months to complete, and 18 test tram runs passed successfully before opening.

== Design ==
The stop consists of twin platforms accessible by ramps at either end.

Due to limited track space in the cutting northwest of the station towards Belgrave Walk tram stop, the tracks are interlaced for a short distance with one rail of the southeast-bound track between the two rails of the northwest-bound track. East of the station there used to be single track to Mitcham Junction station.

== Location ==
It is located between Belgrave Walk and Mitcham Junction, just east of the former Mitcham railway station, which closed in 1997.

London Buses routes 45 and 280, and night routes N44 and N133 serve bus stops near the tram stop. Free interchange for journeys made within an hour is available between trams and buses as part of Transport for London's Hopper fare.

== Services ==
The typical off-peak service in trams per hour from Mitcham is:

- 6 tph in each direction between Beckenham Junction and Wimbledon
- 6 tph in each direction between Elmers End and Wimbledon

Services are operated using Bombardier CR4000 and Stadler Variobahn model low-floor trams.

Preceding station	Tramlink	Following station
Belgrave Walk towards Wimbledon	Tramlink; Wimbledon to Beckenham Junction	Mitcham Junction towards Beckenham Junction
Belgrave Walk towards Wimbledon	Tramlink; Wimbledon to Elmers End	Mitcham Junction towards Elmers End
