= Morden Hall Park =

Former country estate in Morden, London

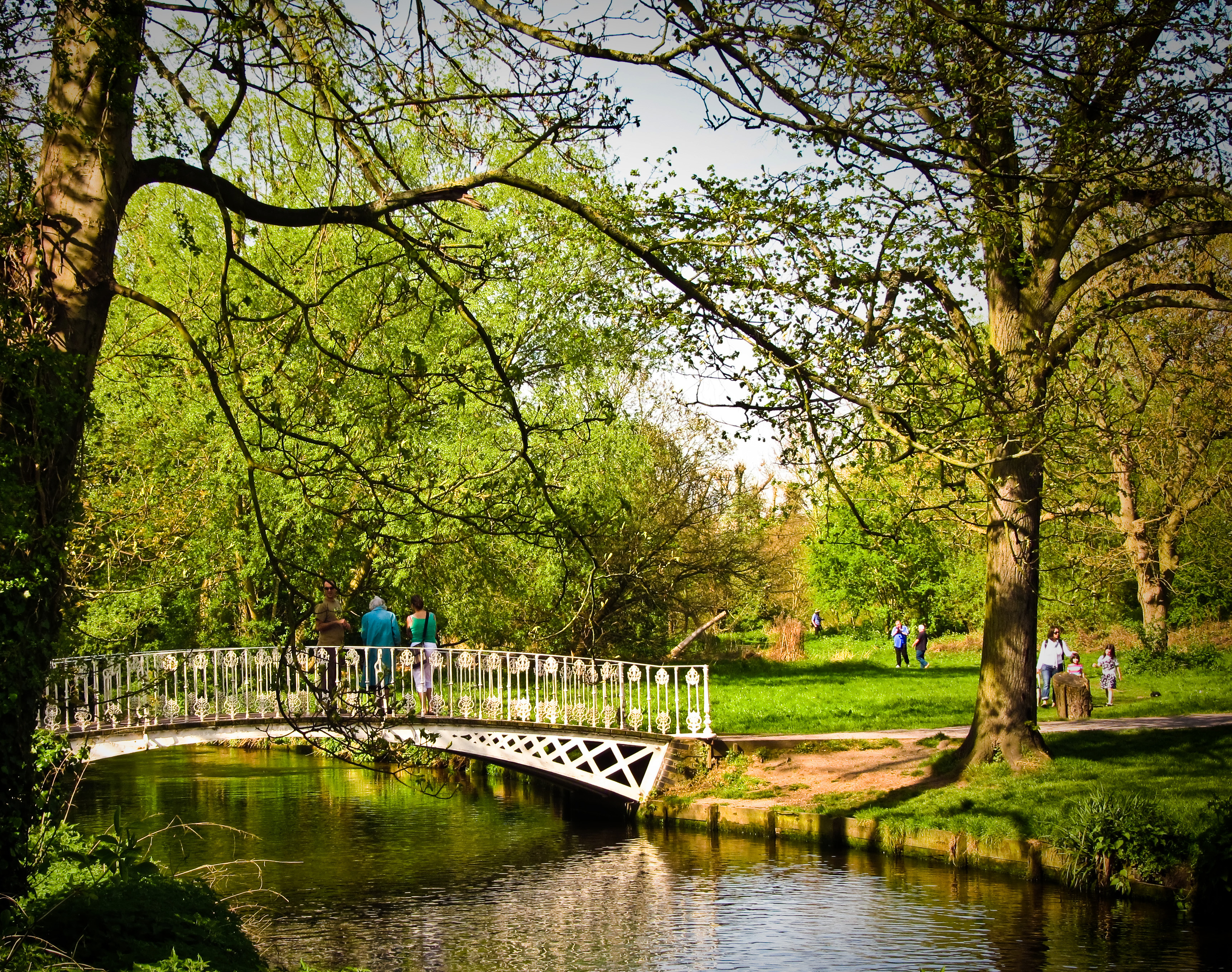
- The White Bridge, Morden Hall Park
- Interactive map of Morden Hall Park
- Location: Morden, London, England
- Coordinates: 51°24′4″N 0°11′15″W
- Area: 125 acres (51 ha)
- Operator: National Trust
- Public transit: Morden tube station and Phipps Bridge tram stop

Morden Hall Park is a National Trust park on the banks of the Wandle in Morden, south London. Its several buildings and associated parking included, it is 125 acres (51 ha) of predominantly parkland. Hinting at the former mill leats the river here splits into channels, generally, through it spanned by numerous footbridges. The estate contains Morden Hall itself, Morden Cottage, two well-preserved snuff watermills, a restored stableyard, a dog-friendly café, exhibition space and second-hand bookshop. A western part, separately accessed, hosts the National Trust's only Garden Centre.

== History ==
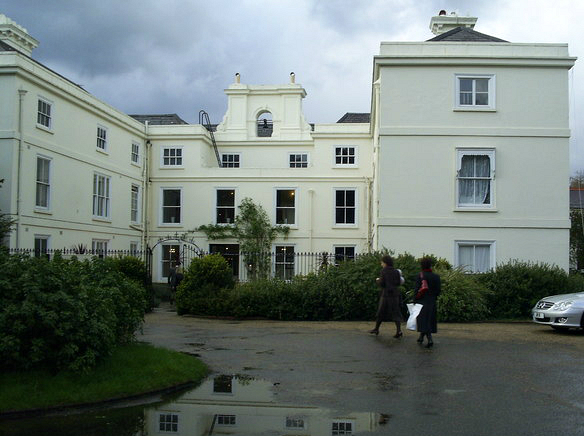
Morden Hall

The estate land was originally owned by Westminster Abbey. There is evidence of an earlier manor-house originally built by the Garth family where Morden Lodge now stands. The Hall dates back to the 1770s and contains a variety of natural landscapes, including the parkland of the "Deer Park", meadow and wetland. A number of historic buildings are located in the park, including the Hall itself and preserved watermills where tobacco was once ground into snuff.

The land was occupied by the Garth family for generations before the estate was split in two and Morden Hall was built. The Hall was occupied, as a school, for young gentlemen about 1840, until it was sold by Sir Richard Garth to a tobacco merchant Gilliat Hatfeild (1827–1906) in the 1870s.

The Hall was a military hospital during the First World War and later a Women and Children's hospital. Gilliat Edward Hatfeild lived at the nearby Morden Cottage.

Gilliat Hatfeild's son, Gilliat Edward Hatfeild (1864–9 February 1941), left the core of the estate (including the house) to the National Trust, when he died.

Several Sunday Pictorial garden parties were hosted on the land in this time in aid of the NSPCC with famous British actors such as Richard Attenborough, Alec Guinness and Patricia Roc in attendance.

== Access ==
The main entrance to the park is a short walk from Morden town centre, and car parking is available in the Garden Centre car park. The Snuff Mills and Pottingshed Café are near to the main entrance.

The Tramlink light rail line from Wimbledon to Croydon, Elmers End and New Addington runs through the northern part of the park, and Phipps Bridge and Morden Road tram stops give access to the park. They are respectively 0.3 mi (0.48 km) and 0.6 mi (0.97 km) walk through the park to the Snuff Mill and Riverside Café. Morden tube station (Northern line) and Morden South railway station (Thameslink) are respectively 0.4 mi (0.64 km) and 0.9 mi (1.4 km) walk through the town centre from the main entrance.

== The Living Green Project ==
Funded by the Heritage Lottery Fund and the EU's Interreg series of programmes, the Living Green Project was conceived as an exemplar to show how historic assets could be maintained to a highly sustainable standard. Architects Cowper Griffiths were appointed by The National Trust along with engineers Crofton Consulting in 2009 to undertake the design with construction work commencing in 2010. Receiving a BREEAM Excellent rating the project won the RICS award for Design and Innovation in 2012 and features as a case study in the BREEAM briefing paper Sustainable Refurbishment of Heritage Buildings - How BREEAM helps to deliver.
