= London Borough of Merton =

Coordinates: 51°23′N 0°10′W

Merton
- London borough
- Coat of arms Council logo
- Motto(s): Stand Fast in Honour and Strength
- Merton shown within Greater London
- Sovereign state: United Kingdom
- Constituent country: England
- Region: London
- Ceremonial county: Greater London
- Created: 1 April 1965
- Admin HQ: Civic Centre; Morden

Government
  - Type: London borough council
  - Body: Merton London Borough Council
  - London Assembly: Leonie Cooper (Lab) AM for Merton and Wandsworth
  - MPs: Paul Kohler (Lib Dem); Siobhain McDonagh (Labour)

Area
  - Total: 14.52 sq mi (37.61 km^{2})
  - Rank: 266th (of 296)

Population (2025)
  - Total: 218,891
  - Rank: 89th (of 296)
  - Density: 15,070/sq mi (5,820/km^{2})
- Time zone: UTC (GMT)
  - Summer (DST): UTC+1 (BST)
- Postcodes: CR, KT, SM, SW
- Area code: 020
- ISO 3166 code: GB-MRT
- ONS code: 00BA
- GSS code: E09000024
- Police: Metropolitan Police
- Website: http://www.merton.gov.uk

The London Borough of Merton (/ˈmɜːrtən/) is a London borough in London, England. The borough was formed under the London Government Act 1963 in 1965 by the merger of the Municipal Borough of Mitcham, the Municipal Borough of Wimbledon and the Merton and Morden Urban District; all were formerly within Surrey.

The main commercial centres in Merton are Mitcham, Morden and Wimbledon, of which Wimbledon is the largest. Other smaller centres include Raynes Park, Colliers Wood, South Wimbledon and Wimbledon Park. The borough is the host of the Wimbledon tournament, one of tennis's Grand Slam competitions.

The borough derives its name from the historic parish of Merton which was centred on the area now known as South Wimbledon. The local authority is Merton London Borough Council, which is based in Morden.

== History ==
The area of the modern borough broadly corresponds to the four ancient parishes of Merton, Mitcham, Morden, and Wimbledon, all of which were historically in the county of Surrey.

The parish of Wimbledon was made a local government district in 1866. Such districts were converted into urban districts under the Local Government Act 1894. The Wimbledon Urban District was subsequently incorporated to become the municipal borough of Wimbledon in 1905.

Merton was made an urban district in 1907; it was enlarged in 1913 to take in neighbouring Morden, becoming the Merton and Morden Urban District. Mitcham was made an urban district in 1915, and it was incorporated to become the municipal borough of Mitcham in 1934.

The modern borough was created in 1965 under the London Government Act 1963, covering the combined area of the former boroughs of Mitcham and Wimbledon and the Merton and Morden Urban District. The area was transferred from Surrey to Greater London to become one of the 32 London Boroughs.

The name Merton for the borough was chosen as a compromise, following a dispute between Wimbledon and Mitcham over the new borough's name.

== Districts ==
Areas in the borough include:

- Bushey Mead
- Colliers Wood
- Copse Hill
- Cottenham Park
- Crooked Billet
- Lower Morden
- Merton Park
- Mitcham
- Mitcham Common
- Morden
- Morden Park
- Motspur Park (also partly Royal Borough of Kingston upon Thames)
- New Malden (also partly Royal Borough of Kingston upon Thames)
- Norbury (also mostly in London Borough of Croydon and partly in London Borough of Lambeth)
- Pollards Hill (also partly in London Borough of Croydon)
- Raynes Park
- St. Helier (also partly in the London Borough of Sutton)
- South Wimbledon
- Southfields (small part) (also mostly in the London Borough of Wandsworth)
- Summerstown (also partly in the London Borough of Wandsworth)
- Wimbledon
- Wimbledon Park

== Governance ==
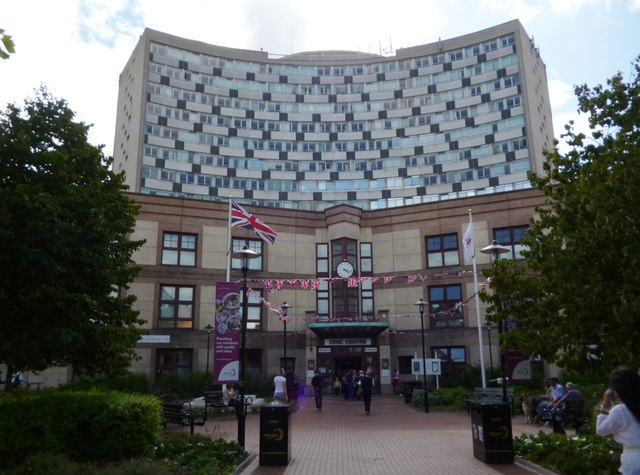
Merton Civic Centre

The local authority is Merton Council, based at Merton Civic Centre in Morden.

=== Greater London representation ===
Since 2000, for elections to the London Assembly, the borough forms part of the Merton and Wandsworth constituency.

== Media ==
Merton Park Studios, opened in 1929, was a British film production studio located at Long Lodge, 269, Kingston Road in Merton Park, South London. In the 1940s, it was owned by Piprodia Entertainment, Nikhanj Films and Film Producers Guild.

Many second-feature films were produced at Merton Park, and for a time it was the base of Radio Luxembourg. Unlike many other studios, it remained open during World War II, producing films for the Ministry of Information. In the late 1940s, the studios produced several children's films.

In 1950, Anglo-Amalgamated began making films at Merton Park. From 1957 to 1959, they produced an average of one second-feature a month there. They produced the crime series Scotland Yard (1953 to 1961, 39 half-hour features), The Edgar Wallace Mysteries (1960 to 1965, 47 hour-long features) and The Scales of Justice (1962 to 1967, 13 half-hour features) at Merton Park. The first film in the Carry On series, Carry On Sergeant (1958), was shot there. The last film made at Merton Park, in March 1967, was from The Scales of Justice series, called "Payment in Kind". Outside filming often took place locally.

Merton Park Studios apart, a considerable amount of filming for the former ITV police drama The Bill took place in Merton, particularly in the districts of Mitcham and Colliers Wood. The set of Sun Hill police station was also located in the Borough.

Ray Austin, born in Abbey Road, Merton, on 5 December 1932, is an English television and film director, television writer, novelist and former stunt performer and actor who worked in both the United Kingdom and the United States. He filmed episodes of The Avengers and The Saint in and around Merton.

The main local newspaper in Merton is the Wimbledon Times (in 2018 the name was changed from Wimbledon Guardian). This newspaper was founded in 1977 by a former Conservative councillor on Merton Council, but since then the paper has been sold on and it is now widely published in different editions across South London. The newspaper is available free, though there is a charge if bought from a newsagent. It is published each Friday. There was an earlier local newspaper known as the Wimbledon Borough News.

== Economy ==
Notable businesses with their headquarters in Merton include:

- Eidos Interactive, a subsidiary of Square Enix, located in Wimbledon Bridge House in Wimbledon.
- Lenstore, an online optical retailer, located in Wimbledon Park
- Square Enix Europe: located in Wimbledon Bridge House in Wimbledon.
- Lidl head offices, located in Wimbledon, although they are moving out of Wimbledon heading for Tolworth.

== Education ==
London's Poverty Profile (a 2017 report by Trust for London and the New Policy Institute) found that 40% of Merton's 19-year-olds lack level 3 qualifications (i.e. broadly equivalent to A-levels). This is the 5th worst figure out of 32 London boroughs.

== Transport ==
Merton is served by a wide range of National Rail stations across the borough, as well as the southern tip of London Underground's Northern line and the District line on the Wimbledon branch. The borough is also served by several Tramlink stops from Wimbledon, that goes to Croydon, New Addington, Elmers End and Beckenham. It is the only London Borough which has tube, rail and tram services.

London Underground stations

- Colliers Wood
- South Wimbledon
- Morden
- Wimbledon Park
- Wimbledon

Tramlink stops

- Wimbledon
- Dundonald Road
- Merton Park
- Morden Road
- Phipps Bridge
- Belgrave Walk
- Mitcham
- Mitcham Junction

National Rail stations

- Tooting
- Haydons Road
- Wimbledon
- Wimbledon Chase
- South Merton
- Morden South
- St Helier
- Mitcham Junction
- Mitcham Eastfields
- Raynes Park
- Motspur Park

In March 2011, the main forms of transport that residents used to travel to work were: driving a car or van, 19.2% of all residents aged 16–74; underground, metro, light rail, tram, 13.0%; train, 13.0%; bus, minibus or coach, 7.5%; on foot, 5.0%; work mainly at or from home, 3.4%; bicycle, 2.4%.

== Demographics and social conditions ==
Population pyramid of the Borough of Merton in 2021

In 2001, the census recorded that 25% of the population of the borough was from an ethnic minority. The highest ethnic populations were recorded in wards in the east of the borough in Mitcham, Eastfields and Pollards Hill. The percentage of population from ethnic minorities is predicted to rise across the borough within the next decade.

A report by Trust for London and the New Policy Institute found that Merton had a poverty rate of 14% in 2020, the 2nd lowest rate in London. It also found that the 2023 level of pay inequality in Merton is lower than in any other borough, except Kingston.

According to the council's comparative assessment of wards made in 2004, the most deprived wards within the borough were in the south and east where unemployment rates, educational attainment and the quality of health were worst. The most affluent wards were in the north and west of the borough.

Comparative crime rates appear to be unrelated to the deprivation ranking of wards. The wards containing Mitcham town centre and the St Helier Estate are ranked highest for crime within Merton with the wards containing the commercial shopping centres of Colliers Wood and Wimbledon also featuring high in the ranking.

The constituency area of Wimbledon is an affluent area of London with a high proportion of city workers, while Mitcham and Morden is relatively deprived by comparison, which explains the geographical split of political representation of the borough at both national and local elections.

Merton currently operates a Police Cadet scheme under the Metropolitan Police Service.

Population census
| Year | Pop. | ±% |
|---|---|---|
| 1801 | 4,831 | — |
| 1811 | 5,656 | +17.1% |
| 1821 | 6,433 | +13.7% |
| 1831 | 6,652 | +3.4% |
| 1841 | 7,364 | +10.7% |
| 1851 | 7,334 | −0.4% |
| 1861 | 14,118 | +92.5% |
| 1871 | 20,901 | +48.0% |
| 1881 | 27,684 | +32.5% |
| 1891 | 41,318 | +49.2% |
| 1901 | 63,273 | +53.1% |
| 1911 | 96,895 | +53.1% |
| 1921 | 122,245 | +26.2% |
| 1931 | 154,267 | +26.2% |
| 1941 | 174,151 | +12.9% |
| 1951 | 196,599 | +12.9% |
| 1961 | 187,074 | −4.8% |
| 1971 | 178,023 | −4.8% |
| 1981 | 165,098 | −7.3% |
| 1991 | 171,808 | +4.1% |
| 2001 | 187,908 | +9.4% |
| 2011 | 199,693 | +6.3% |
| 2024 estimate | 218,539 | +9.4% |
Note: 2024 estimate

=== Ethnicity ===
| Ethnic Group | Year | | | | | | | | | | | |
| Ethnic Group | 1971 estimations | | 1981 estimations | | 1991 census | | 2001 census | | 2011 census | | 2021 census | |
| Ethnic Group | Number | % | Number | % | Number | % | Number | % | Number | % | Number | % |
| White: Total | – | 94.4% | 146,376 | 89.3% | 141,093 | 83.7% | 140,883 | 74.97% | 129,606 | 64.8% | 129,617 | 60.2% |
|---|---|---|---|---|---|---|---|---|---|---|---|---|
| White: British | – | – | – | – | – | – | 120,378 | 64.1% | 96,658 | 48.4% | 88,673 | 41.2% |
| White: Irish | – | – | – | – | – | – | 5,464 | 2.9% | 4,417 | 2.2% | 4,337 | 2.0% |
| White: Gypsy or Irish Traveller | – | – | – | – | – | – | – | – | 216 | 0.1% | 194 | 0.1% |
| White: Roma | – | – | – | – | – | – | – | – | – | – | 813 | 0.4% |
| White: Other | – | – | – | – | – | – | 15,041 | 8.0% | 28,315 | 14.1% | 35,600 | 16.5% |
| Asian or Asian British: Total | – | – | – | – | 14,688 | 8.7% | 23,292 | 12.4% | 36,143 | 17.9% | 40,019 | 18.6% |
| Asian or Asian British: Indian | – | – | – | – | 5751 | | 8,043 | % | 8,106 | 4.0% | 9,607 | 4.5% |
| Asian or Asian British: Pakistani | – | – | – | – | 2241 | | 4,504 | % | 7,337 | 3.6% | 9,667 | 4.5% |
| Asian or Asian British: Bangladeshi | – | – | – | – | 882 | | 1,702 | % | 2,216 | 1.1% | 2,470 | 1.1% |
| Asian or Asian British: Chinese | – | – | – | – | 1216 | | 2,485 | % | 2,618 | 1.3% | 3,615 | 1.7% |
| Asian or Asian British: Other Asian | – | – | – | – | 4598 | | 6,558 | % | 15,866 | 7.9% | 14,660 | 6.8% |
| Black or Black British: Total | – | – | – | – | 9,657 | 5.7% | 14,626 | 7.7% | 20,811 | 10.6% | 22,887 | 10.6% |
| Black or Black British: African | – | – | – | – | 3314 | | 6,976 | % | 10,442 | 5.2% | 12,218 | 5.7% |
| Black or Black British: Caribbean | – | – | – | – | 4899 | | 6,438 | % | 8,126 | 4.0% | 7,632 | 3.5% |
| Black or Black British: Other Black | – | – | – | – | 1444 | | 1,212 | % | 2,243 | 1.1% | 3,037 | 1.4% |
| Mixed or British Mixed: Total | – | – | – | – | – | – | 5,869 | 3.1% | 9,334 | 4.5% | 12,765 | 5.9% |
| Mixed: White and Black Caribbean | – | – | – | – | – | – | 1,630 | % | 2,579 | 1.2% | 3,009 | 1.4% |
| Mixed: White and Black African | – | – | – | – | – | – | 734 | % | 1,279 | 0.6% | 1,722 | 0.8% |
| Mixed: White and Asian | – | – | – | – | – | – | 1,918 | % | 2,829 | 1.4% | 3,756 | 1.7% |
| Mixed: Other Mixed | – | – | – | – | – | – | 1,587 | % | 2,647 | 1.3% | 4,278 | 2.0% |
| Other: Total | – | – | – | – | 3032 | 1.8% | 3,238 | % | 3,799 | 1.8% | 9,899 | 4.6% |
| Other: Arab | – | – | – | – | – | – | – | – | 1,413 | 0.7% | 1,923 | 0.9% |
| Other: Any other ethnic group | – | – | – | – | 3032 | | 3,238 | % | 2,386 | 1.1% | 7,976 | 3.7% |
| Ethnic minority: Total | – | 5.6% | 17,472 | 10.7% | 27,377 | 16.2% | 47,025 | 25.0% | 70,033 | 35.2% | 85,570 | 39.8% |
| Total | – | 100% | 163,848 | 100% | 168,470 | 100% | 187,908 | 100.00% | 199,693 | 100.00% | 215,187 | 100% |

=== Religion ===
The following shows the religious identity of residents residing in Merton according to the 2021 census.

| Religion | 2021 | |
| Religion | Number | % |
|---|---|---|
| Christian | 101,320 | 47,08% |
| Muslim | 21,673 | 10,07% |
| Sikh | 614 | 0,29% |
| Hindu | 12,610 | 5,86% |
| Buddhist | 1,899 | 0,88% |
| Jewish | 754 | 0,35% |
| Other religion | 1,205 | 0,56% |
| No religion | 60,224 | 27,99% |
| Religion not stated | 14,888 | 6,92% |
| Total population | 215,187 | 100% |

=== Immigration ===
This list includes top-15 sources of immigration to Borough of Merton for 2021 census:

| # | Country | Number |
|---|---|---|
| 1 | Poland | 6,934 |
| 2 | Sri Lanka | 5,595 |
| 3 | Pakistan | 4,925 |
| 4 | India | 4,701 |
| 5 | South Africa | 3,636 |
| 6 | Bulgaria | 3,157 |
| 7 | Ghana | 3,037 |
| 8 | Romania | 2,932 |
| 9 | Italy | 2,693 |
| 10 | Ireland | 2,628 |
| 11 | Brazil | 2,133 |
| 12 | Jamaica | 1,988 |
| 13 | Portugal | 1,711 |
| 14 | Spain | 1,685 |
| 15 | France | 1,571 |

== Sport ==
=== Wimbledon tennis tournament ===
Each year The Championships, Wimbledon, better known simply as Wimbledon, is held at the All England Lawn Tennis and Croquet Club in Church Road Wimbledon. It is one of the four tennis Grand Slam tournaments (along with the US, French and Australian Opens) and takes place over a fortnight at the end of June and beginning of July. It is the largest annual sporting event to take place in the United Kingdom, with over 200,000 visitors during the Wimbledon fortnight.

=== Football ===
The borough gained a football team in 1889 when Wimbledon Old Centrals were founded, and were soon a member of the local football leagues. The club later adopted the title Wimbledon FC and moved into a new stadium at Plough Lane in 1912, where it would spend the next 79 years. Later in the 20th century, the club achieved considerable success in non-league football. The club was elected to the Football League in 1977 and enjoyed a great run of success, which began in 1983 with the Fourth Division title, and saw them reach the First Division in 1986 – a mere nine years after joining the Football League. They quickly established themselves in the highest division of English football, and as clear underdogs, pulled off a shock win in the 1988 FA Cup Final against Liverpool, England's most successful and dominant club side in Europe during that era. They were founder members of the FA Premier League in 1992 and survived at that level until 2000, before relocating to Milton Keynes, some 70 miles away in Buckinghamshire, in a controversial move in 2003; they were rebranded as Milton Keynes Dons in 2004. The club had left its Plough Lane stadium in 1991 to ground-share with Crystal Palace at Selhurst Park. Numerous plans were considered to build a new stadium in a number of different locations (including back in London and even in Dublin or Cardiff) over the following decade before the club's owners chose Milton Keynes as their destination.

However, a new Wimbledon club – AFC Wimbledon – was formed to represent the local area in 2002 by fans of the original club after the move to Milton Keynes was given the go-ahead. The new Wimbledon club's progress was rapid, and after just nine years in existence they won promotion to the Football League in 2011. The club gained permission in 2016 to build a new stadium back in Plough Lane, using the former Greyhound Stadium around a hundred yards from its old stadium site and still within the London Borough of Merton. In 2018 the final agreements were signed off and demolition work started on the site (for both stadium and 600 flats) in April 2018. Building was completed for the 2020–21 season. The first competitive game in front of fans was played on 14 August 2021, a 3–3 draw against Bolton Wanderers.

The borough also has five non-League football clubs: Colliers Wood United F.C. who play at Wibbandune Sports Ground; Raynes Park Vale F.C. who play at Prince George's Fields; Tooting & Mitcham United F.C. who play at Imperial Fields, Morden; Merton Forest F.C. who also play at Prince George's Fields, and a Celebrity Fundraising Football team – Celeb FC who play all over the UK without charge for small UK charities.

== Television ==
The Talkback Thames television studio on Deer Park Road was used as Sun Hill Police Station in the ITV police drama The Bill from its inception in 1984 until it was axed in 2010.

== Sister cities ==
- Irving, Texas, United States

== Freedom of the Borough ==
The following people (all sports people) have received the Freedom of the Borough of Merton.

=== Individuals ===
- Andy Murray: 20 July 2014.
- Angela Mortimer: 27 June 2014.
- Ann Haydon-Jones: 27 July 2014.
- Virginia Wade: 27 July 2014.
- Dickie Guy: 16 July 2021.
