= Karel Janovický =

Czech composer (1930–2024)

Karel Janovický (18 February 1930 – 9 January 2024) was a Czech composer, pianist, BBC producer and administrator who lived in the United Kingdom from 1950. He was one of the youngest of the group of European émigré composers who came to live and work in Britain during the 1930s and 1940s to avoid persecution at home.

== Education and career ==
Janovický was born in Plzeň as Bohuš František Šimsa. He was the son of Bohuslav Šimsa, a baritone soloist at the Plzeň Opera. Growing up under the German occupation, he studied piano from an early age and later composition with Josef Bartovský (1884–1964). In 1949 he was unsuccessful in applying to study at the Academy of Performing Arts in Prague (HAMU) for political reasons. (The Czech coup of February 1948 had resulted in Communist Party control over the Czech Government). So in October of that year he left with his future wife Sylva Maiwaldová for Germany, arriving a year later in England.

Once there he continued his studies: first at the Surrey College of Music, Fitznells Manor in Ewell under Percy Turnbull; then at The Royal College of Music where he completed a Master of Music degree; and also privately with Matyas Seiber (composition) and Jan Šedivka (chamber music). Janovický joined the British Broadcasting Corporation in 1964, moving to the BBC World Service in 1967. During the 1970s he was an occasional broadcaster under the name Jack Allen, hosting programmes of modern Czech music. From 1980 until his retirement in 1990 he managed the BBC's Czechoslovak department.

Promoting Czech music in the UK, Janovický championed performances of Dvořák's vocal compositions and operas, Smetana's The Bartered Bride, Janáček's Katya Kabanova and Jenůfa, Martinů's Field Mass and other works in the original Czech language. He was active in the Antonín Dvořák Society for many years. He translated Czech music theory and music history texts into English, including the translation and revision of Jaroslav Vogel's biography of Janáček in 1983. And he continued to coach many singers and choirs, including the BBC Singers, in pronunciation of the Czech language.

== Personal life and death ==
Janovický was a keen walker, "never happier than half way up a Scottish mountain with a favourite dog", and was active in the Scout Movement. He died in the United Kingdom on 9 January 2024, at the age of 93. He was survived by his wife, Sylva, and children Cyril Simsa (born 1960) and Debora Cane (born 1962).

== Music ==
Janovický was a prolific composer with over 200 works in his catalogue, ranging from opera, choral works and songs through to orchestral, string and wind ensembles, chamber music and piano works. His earliest compositions were written while he was still in Plzeň. These include many solo piano works and a series of pieces for spoken voice and piano.

After his move to England he was awarded the Dutch Gaudeamus Foundation composition prize for his Piano Variations on the theme of Brigadier H. Smitke, Op. 7. In 1954 his Concerto for Violin and String Orchestra, Op. 10, was premiered at the Royal Festival Hall in London with Jan Šedivka soloist and the Kalmar Orchestra conducted by Colin Davis. On 14 February 1956, he made his debut at The Wigmore Hall with cellist Selu Trau, who also played his Sonata for Solo Cello, Op. 11. In 1957 he won the Bournemouth Symphony Orchestra 'Garland for Shakespeare' competition with his Variations on a theme of Robert Johnson, Op.17, which was first performed by the Bournemouth Symphony Orchestra under Sir Charles Groves. (The theme is taken from Robert Johnson's Where the Bee Sucks). The Utmost Sail (1958) is a one act opera on a science fiction theme inspired by the launch of the satellite Sputnik in 1957. It concerns the crew of a space ship flying into space and watching the Earth being consumed in a nuclear holocaust.

Although Janovický's rate of composition slowed down considerably from the early 1960s due to his heavy work commitments at the BBC, he resumed at full pace on his retirement in 1990. His song cycle A Bed of Roses, words by Richard Robbins, was written for the tenor John Upperton and premiered at The Purcell Room in 1999. Rain Songs a 2010 song cycle setting poems by the Hungarian-born poet and translator George Szirtes, was written in memory of his teacher Mátyás Seiber. The last of a series of piano sonatas was completed in 2017. The Four Houseman Songs, composed in 2018, received a first performance in 2019 by Katherine Nicholson and Joan Taylor at a Dvorak Society concert. The Prazak String Quartet performed the String Quartet No 4 at Leamington’s Royal Pump Rooms on 25 February 2022.

=== Selected compositions ===
- Opera: The Utmost Sail, Op.22 (1958)
- Vocal: Nine Songs for Alto, Violin and Piano (1951); Twelve Peasant Carols of Moravia (1958); Three Cambridge Songs (1981); Passages of Flight song cycle (1995); A Bed of Roses song cycle (1999); The Corner of My Eye song cycle (2002); Sudiček Blues (2008); Rain Songs (2010); Four songs to words by A.E.Housman (2018).
- Choral: Canons for Three Voices a cappella on sentences from Dhamapadda (1951); Ave Maria (1996).
- Orchestral: Two symphonies (1951, 2004); Piano Concerto (1952); Violin Concerto (1954) Variations on a Theme of Robert Johnson (1956); Organ Concerto (1957); Concerto for Strings (2002); Prelude and Double Fugue for Strings (2003) Fantasy for Piano and String Orchestra on Motives from Dvořák's Biblical Songs (2009).
- Chamber music: 10 string quartets (between 1951 and 2018); two piano trios (1953, 2005); Trio for Guitars (1986); Piano Quartet (2015).
- Strings: Five sonatas for violin and piano (between 1955 and 2015); two sonatas for viola and piano; two sonatas for solo cello.
- Wind: Quintet for Flute and Strings (1956); Bass Clarinet Sonata (1984); Saxophone Quartet (1996); Bassoon Sonata (2005); Clarinet Sonata (2007); Bassoon Quartet (2013); Wind Quintet (2016).
- Piano: 13 (?) piano sonatas (between 1947 and 2017); Twelve Sentiments suite (1952); Tango for Time out of Mind (2006)
- Organ: Two fantasias for organ (1994, 1998)

=== Recordings ===
- Bassoon Quartet (2013), first performance by the Doune Bassoon Quartet at the Rural Hall, Doune 8 May 2013.
- The Little Linden Pipe (2016) for treble recorder, on Rawsthorne and Other Rarities, Divine Art DDA 25169 (2018)
- Passages of Flight (1995) song cycle, on Czech Songs Of The 20th Century, Oliverius OL 0005-2 131 (1996)
- Piano Quartet (2015), first performance by the Dvorak Piano Quartet, International Music Festival, Prague, Spring 2017.
- Quintet for Treble Recorder and String Quartet (2010), on The Proud Recorder, Prima Facie PFCD 038 (2015)
- Rain Songs (2010), Passages of Flight (1995), Piano Sonata (2005), Sonata for treble recorder (2013), Quintet for recorder and strings (2010), Festive Fantasia and Fugue for recorder and piano (2013), on Rainsongs and Other Works, Prima Facia PFCD060 (2018)
- Sonata for Harp (2000), on Contemporary Czech Music, ArcoDiva UP 0081 (2005)
