= Freda Swain =

British composer, pianist and music educator (1902–1985)

Freda Swain (31 October 1902 – 29 January 1985) was a British composer, pianist and music educator.

== Biography ==
Freda Swain was born in Portsmouth, England, the daughter of Thomas and Gertrude (née Allen) Swain. Her first piano lessons (from age 11) were at the Tobias Matthay Piano School in London, given by Matthay's sister Dora. Three years later she went to study composition with Charles Villiers Stanford and piano with Arthur Alexander at the Royal College of Music, earning awards including the Sullivan Prize in 1921.

Swain married Arthur Alexander in 1921, and before World War II the couple toured South Africa and Australia, lecturing, broadcasting and performing recitals. In 1924 she began teaching at the Royal College and in 1936 she founded the British Music Movement to help promote the efforts of young composers and artists. With her husband she was on the founding board of the Surrey College of Music from the mid-1940s. From 1942 they lived in a bungalow on Chinnor Hill in Oxfordshire. Alexander died in 1969. Freda Swain died on 29 January 1985.

== Composition ==
Swain wrote some 450 pieces, piano and chamber music as well as many songs, but also opera and orchestral works, including two piano concertos and a clarinet concertino intended for Frederick Thurston. Few were performed aside from a series featured in the NEMO Series of concerts that Swain herself founded after the war. Her first major success was The Harp of Aengus for violin and orchestra (after the Yeats poem), with soloist Achille Rivarde at Queen's Hall in January 1925. The solo Violin Sonata was premiered by May Harrison at Wigmore Hall on 8 December 1933. Her "Airmail" Piano Concerto, mailed in instalments to her husband Arthur Alexander while he was stuck in South Africa during World War II, was performed by Alexander in Cape Town. She composed a one-act opera Second Chance, but left two other operas incomplete.

Her piano compositions include three large scale piano sonatas and 40 or so other works for solo piano, including many educational pieces. There is also a substantial cello sonata, two violin sonatas (one with piano, the other unaccompanied), two string quartets, a piano quartet, a sextet with horn and clarinet, a Suite for Six Trumpets and many other chamber and instrumental pieces.

Swain's surviving manuscripts were handed down to her pupil and friend David Stevens, founder of the Swain-Alexander Trust. In turn they were passed on to Swiss pianist Timon Altwegg in 2005, who has begun recording the piano works for Toccata Classics. Dutton Vocalion issued a CD of her chamber music in 2024 and another of her music for violin and piano in 2025, including her large scale Violin Sonata of 1947. In June 2024 the Henschel Quartet revived her first string quartet, the Norfolk, at the Aldeburgh Festival. A recording of her Concertino for clarinet was issued in 2026.

== Selected works ==
=== Chamber ===
- Dance Forms from an Unknown Country, for flute, oboe, clarinet and piano (1958)
- Festival Suite for horn, piano and percussion (1967)
- Lamentations, for 2 cellos and piano (1960)
- Piano Quartet in G minor, The Sea (1950)
- '* Sextet (with horn and clarinet)
- Solemn Salutation for brass ensemble (1951)
- String Quartet No. 1 in E minor Norfolk (1924)
- String Quartet No. 2 in G minor (1949)
- Suite for Six Trumpets (1952)
- Tercet for violin, viola and cello

=== Instrumental ===
- Ballade for violin and piano (1956)
- Berceuse for violin and piano (1919)
- By the Loch for cello and piano (1960)
- Cello Sonata in C minor (1923)
- Contrasts (1953) for clarinet and piano ('Heather Hill' and 'Derry Down')
- A Country Pastoral for organ (1957)
- Danse Barbare for violin and cello
- English Reel for viola and piano (1958)
- English Pastoral for organ (1958)
- Fantasy Suite for oboe and piano
- Highland Hills for violin and piano (1951)
- Hornpipe, Air, Jig and Finale, (also known as Movements) for violin and piano (1955)
- Imitation and Reversion for violin and piano (1955)
- Laburnum Tree for clarinet and piano (1960)
- Lento con espressione for violin and piano
- Lento e teneramente for violin and piano
- Nocturne for violin and piano (1957)
- Pastoral Reflection for violin and piano (1953)
- Pipe Tunes for clarinet and piano
- Rhapsody for clarinet and piano (for Frederick Thurston)
- Sonata for violin in C minor ?? (no traces of that one)
- Sonata for violin in B minor, The River 1925 (Lost)
- Sonata for violin in G minor (1947)
- Song at Evening for viola and piano (1958)
- Summer Rhapsody No. 1 for viola and piano (performed 1936)
- Vielle Chanson Triste for violin and piano
- Waving Grass for clarinet and piano (1960)
- The Willow Tree for clarinet and piano (1948)

=== Orchestral ===
- The Harp of Angus (1925), tone poem for violin and orchestra
- Lumine naturi, Concertino for clarinet, horn and strings
- Miniature Suite for string orchestra (1952)
- A Pastoral Fantasy (1936–37)
- Piano Concerto 'Airmail' (1939)
- Piano Concerto
- Walking and Dream Tide for string orchestra (or cello and piano)

=== Opera ===
- Second Chance, premiered at Bath in 1955, libretto Swain and M. Rodd
- The Shadowy Waters (operatic setting, based on Yeats)
- The Spell (incomplete)

=== Piano ===
- The Croon of the Sea (1920)
- Crossbow Castle (suite, four pieces)
- An English Idyll (1942)
- Humoresque
- Mountain Ash (1931)
- Prelude and Toccata (1955)
- The Red Flower
- Scherzo for three pianos
- Sonata Saga in F minor (1924, rev. 1929 and 1930)
- Sonata No. 1 in A minor, The Skerries (1936–37, rev. 1945)
- Sonata No. 2 in F-sharp minor (1950)
- Sonatina
- Two South Africa Impressions: 'Mimosa' and 'The Lonely Dove'
- Spring Mood
- Waltz Charming
- The Windmill

=== Songs ===
- April (text: A. E. Coppard)
- Blessing (text: Austin Clarke)
- The Chevalier's Lament (text: Robert Burns)
- Experience (Chinese text: translated Arthur Waley)
- The Green Lad From Donegal
- The Indwelling, song cycle for voices, strings, piano and drum (fp. 1961)
- The Lark on Portsdown Hill (text: composer)
- Sweet Content (text: Robert Greene)
- Sympathy (text: Emily Brontë)
- Three Sonnets by Shakespeare (1936) (with non-vocal prelude, Summer Rhapsody)
- Winter Field
- over 100 songs, including settings of Bridges, A. E. Housman and Shakespeare

=== Choral ===
- Bells of Heaven (Christmas carol, text: Mary Brandon)
- Breathe on Me, Breath of God, anthem
- Cantata In Memoriam
- A Gaelic Prayer, anthem
- Now Rest We All Content (wedding anthem, text: Mary Brandon)
- Psalm 150 (1973)
- Rejoice in the Lord (1961)
- Unseen Heralds (text: Mary Brandon)
