= Ewell Castle School =

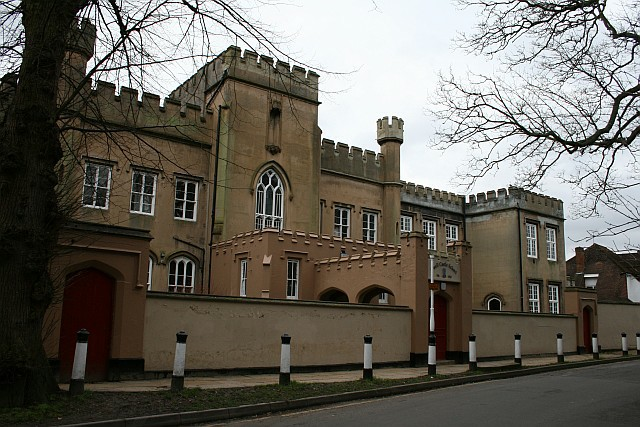

Location
- Church Street, Ewell; Epsom, Surrey, KT17 2AW; England; 51.3507°N 0.2468°W

Information
- Type: Private school
- Motto: Inspire, Nurture, Achieve
- Established: 1926
- Founder: Herbert Budgell
- Local authority: Surrey County Council
- Department for Education URN: 125380 Tables
- Principal: Silas Edmonds
- Gender: Mixed
- Age range: 3–18
- Enrolment: 600 (2020)
- Capacity: 700
- Houses: Arundel; Bodium; Carisbrooke; | Dover}}
- Colours: Blue, white, red
- Publication: The Ewellian
- Alumni: Old Ewellians
- Website: ewellcastle.co.uk

Ewell Castle School is a 3–18 mixed, private day school and sixth form in Ewell, Epsom, Surrey, England. It was founded in 1926 by Herbert Budgell as a boarding school and became fully mixed in September 2015. It consists of the Main House, Glyn House, Chessington Lodge and Fitzalan House.

== Houses ==
The school has four houses: Arundel, Bodiam, Carisbrooke and Dover. Each form group is made up of members from one house. Pupils can change house throughout their time at the school as they change form groups.

== Societies ==
The clubs range from Design, Sciences, Politics and Debating to Sports and recreation (e.g. Sailing, Duke of Edinburgh Award). A team from the school won first prize in the Epsom, Ewell and Banstead Schools' Enterprise Challenge 2008.

== Sports ==
The School has rugby, tennis and cricket pitches. There are also cricket nets and athletics facilities. The school has a multi-purpose Sports Hall complex.

Sporting fixtures in a wide range of sports are played against other independent schools such as Charterhouse, City of London Freemen's School, Halliford School, St Paul's, King's College School, Epsom College and Reigate Grammar School.

== Music and drama ==
=== Music ===
The newest building in the school is the music pavilion opened by Sampha, a notable alumnus of the school, in 2017. The senior school previously used the Junior School music department on the lower floor of Glyn House but their music department is now easily accessible on the grounds of all of their other buildings. The music pavilion is also devoted to the school's many bands, choirs and solo artists.

The Fitznells School of Music, founded by Vivienne Price in 1959 and initially based at Fitznells Manor, was relocated to Ewell Castle School in 1988.

=== Drama ===
There are annual Drama productions and this year some of the pupils embarked on LAMDA exams. In addition, Ewell Castle performed Oliver! at the Epsom Playhouse Theatre in 2016. Also, Ewell Castle performed Little Shop of Horrors at the Epsom Playhouse on 7 March 2019.

== Controversy ==
A former Deputy Head of the Ewell Castle Preparatory school (from years 3 to 6), Andy Robson, was jailed for two years after filming children getting undressed in changing rooms. Robson, who had been a safeguarding leader at the school, took the indecent images between March 2010 and February 2017.

== Notable alumni ==
- George Atkinson, youngest Briton to climb Mount Everest
- Dick Francis, jockey and author
- Matthew Kidd, Olympic swimmer and silver medalist at the Commonwealth Games
- Terence Morgan, actor
- Peter Newbrook, cinematographer
- Tim Palmer - Grammy-nominated record producer and mixer
- Dusan Popov, attended briefly, World War II spy
- Oliver Reed, actor
- Jimmy Sangster, screenwriter and director
- Steven Savile, author
- Sampha, musician
- Fred Winter, champion jockey and trainer
