= Surrey College of Music =

Coordinates: 51°21′08″N 0°15′08″W

The Surrey College of Music was founded in 1946 by music teacher and educational composer John Longmire (1902-1986) with composer and organist Reginald Jevons (1901-1981). It was based at Fitznells Manor in Ewell, and received support from many of the leading musical luminaries of the time, including Sir Arnold Bax as president and Sir Adrian Boult as one of the Vice Presidents. (The other Vice President was the Home Secretary James Chuter Ede).

Longmire had studied with John Ireland and pianist Arthur Alexander at the Royal College of Music, and both agreed to serve on the advisory board of the new College. The composer, teacher and pianist Freda Swain (married to Alexander) was also on the board. Jevons was principal and Longmire was effectively Director of Music. Lady Ebbisham performed the opening ceremony on 21 September 1946, with E J Dent, Gordon Jacob and pianist Mabel Lander (a pupil of Leschetizky and piano tutor to the young Princess Elizabeth) among the guests.

Formed in the wake of the United Kingdom's Education Act 1944, which aimed to expand secondary educational opportunities for children of all backgrounds by establishing new categories of grammar, secondary modern and technical schools, the College served as a training institution for music teachers needed for the new institutions. It was also a useful employment opportunity and staging post for some of the wave of émigré composers and musicians who had sought refuge in the UK during this period. Jan Sedivka, appointed to teach violin in 1946, was naturalised as a British citizen on the strength of the appointment. Karel Janovický, a refugee from Prague at the age of 20, was accepted as a student.

Other musicians on the teaching staff included pianist and composer Percy Turnbull and harpsichordist Ruth Dyson (1907-1997).

Despite its initial success, the College struggled financially. In 1950 it appealed for support through subscription from "all those interested in music education" to add more space, buy equipment and stock the library. In December 1956 the lease of Fitznells was terminated and the College effectively closed, with activities split into two. Correspondence courses for music teachers were offered under the name Southern Music Training Centre from Bromley in Kent until 1991. And in 1959 Fitznells Manor was bought by Vivienne Price (founder of the National Children's Orchestra in 1978), and her husband Tony Carter. They formed the Fitznells School of Music offering instrumental and music theory lessons for children, running it on the ground floor while living upstairs. When the house was sold in 1988 the music school was moved to Ewell Castle School.
