= Vivienne Price =

British music teacher (1931–2014)

- Born: 9 January 1931; Leigh-on-Sea, Essex, England
- Died: 6 November 2014 (aged 83)
- Occupation: Music teacher
- Known for: Founder of the National Children's Orchestra and Surrey College of Music
- Spouse: Tony Carter

Vivienne Lola Price MBE (9 January 1931 – 6 November 2014) was a British music teacher and the founder of the National Children's Orchestra in 1978. In 1959, she and her husband Tony Carter bought Fitznells Manor in Ewell, Surrey, and formed the Fitznells School of Music, running it on the ground floor while living upstairs. When the house was sold in 1988 the music school was moved to Ewell Castle School. Vivienne was presented with a lifetime achievement award at the Music Teacher awards for excellence 2014. She was made MBE in 1997.
