= Arthur Alexander (pianist) =

New Zealand-born pianist, teacher and composer

Arthur Alexander (25 March 1891 – 8 July 1969) was a New Zealand-born pianist, teacher and composer who spent most of his career in the United Kingdom.

== Education and early career ==
Alexander was born in Dunedin and educated at Wellington College, where he studied piano with Maughan Barnett and composition and harmony with Lawrence Watkins. In 1907 he left for London to study at the Royal Academy of Music under Tobias Matthay (piano) and Frederick Corder (composition). He won the largest number of prizes ever at the academy, including the Macfarren and Chappell gold medals for piano playing, and was appointed a sub-professor there. He was also a singer, and in early recitals he sometimes accompanied himself.

== Soloist and teacher ==
In 1912 he began his international career as a pianist with concerts in Berlin (with the Australian violinist Leila Doubleday) and Vienna. There were also many recitals in London including first performances of Bax (the Second Sonata, at the Aeolian Hall on 24 November 1919), Scriabin (the Fifth Sonata), Medtner (a personal friend) and others. From 1912 he was also professor at the Matthay Pianoforte School (1912–1939) and from 1920 a professor at the Royal College of Music. His many pupils included Malcolm Binns, Ruth Gipps, Thea King, John Longmire, Elizabeth Maconchy, Helen Perkin, Freda Swain (his future wife), John Tilbury and John White. His friends and associates included Arnold Bax, Sam Hartley Braithwaite, Harriet Cohen, John Ireland and Nikolai Medtner.

== Marriage ==
Alexander married the composer Freda Swain in 1921, and before World War II the couple toured South Africa and Australia, lecturing, broadcasting and performing recitals. On the outbreak of war, Alexander was in South Africa and was unable to leave. Swain wrote a piano concerto for him, scoring it on very thin paper so that it could be airmailed to him in instalments. Alexander performed it in Cape Town and elsewhere and it became known as the 'Airmail' Concerto. They were both on the founding board of the Surrey College of Music from the mid-1940s. From 1942 they lived in a bungalow on Chinnor Hill in Oxfordshire, continuing to perform separately and as a duo into the 1960s. Alexander died in 1969, aged 78. He was survived by his wife, who died on 29 January 1985.

== Composer ==
His compositions, largely forgotten now, include songs, many piano works (including the Four Variations on a Folk-Song and Four Irish Airs), chamber music (including a string quartet) and orchestral pieces, which were performed at the Queen's Hall and elsewhere.
