= Ruth Falcon =

American soprano and voice teacher (1942–2020)

Ruth Falcon (November 2, 1942 – October 9, 2020) was an American operatic soprano and voice teacher.

== Career ==
Falcon began singing in the youth choir at Salem Church in New Orleans, where the choir director recognized her talent and began giving her lessons. Falcon graduated from Loyola University of the South (BM, in 1964) and Tulane University (MFA, in 1971). While at Tulane, she met Douglas Meyer, whom she married in 1988. Falcon debuted with the New Orleans Opera Association as Frasquita in Carmen, in 1968, opposite Norman Treigle as Escamillo. She made her first appearance with the New York City Opera as Micaëla in that same opera, in 1974. A review in The New York Times announced that "Falcon is a soprano to reckon with . . . [her] robust and glistening voice easily pierced the lushest orchestration." She went on to appear as the Contessa Almaviva in Le nozze di Figaro and Donna Anna in Don Giovanni, with the City Opera. She studied with Marinka Gurewich in New York City.

In 1976 she joined the Bavarian State Opera, portraying such roles as Donna Anna in Don Giovanni, Contessa Almaviva in Le nozze di Figaro, and Leonora in Il trovatore.

She sang the first of her eleven appearances with the Metropolitan Opera in 1989, as the Empress in Die Frau ohne Schatten. In 1992, the soprano portrayed Chrysothemis in Elektra (conducted by James Levine), and, in 1996, sang the title role in Turandot (with Angela Gheorghiu as Liù). In the Met's 1996–97 season, she made her final operatic appearances, as Gertrud in Hänsel und Gretel (with Jennifer Larmore and Dawn Upshaw, conducted by Sir Andrew Davis), a performance that was broadcast.

Falcon also appeared at Covent Garden, Paris Opéra, Wiener Staatsoper, Bayerische Staatsoper, Deutsche Oper Berlin, Teatro la Fenice, Teatro Colón, Opéra de Monte-Carlo, and Aix-en-Provence Festival.

Her discography includes a recording of Beethoven's Ninth Symphony, conducted by Lord Menuhin (1990).

=== Teaching ===
In 1988, while still performing onstage, Falcon started teaching. Over her career she taught at The New School's Mannes School of Music in New York and the Curtis Institute of Music (adjunct) in Philadelphia, as well as privately with singers in the Met's Lindemann Young Artists Program and with members of opera companies in Chicago, Washington and Los Angeles. Among her celebrated students are Ainhoa Arteta, Danielle de Niese, Sondra Radvanovsky, Nadine Sierra, and Deborah Voigt.

Ms. Falcon died on October 9, 2020, at the age of 77.
