= Grace Bumbry =

American opera singer (1937–2023)

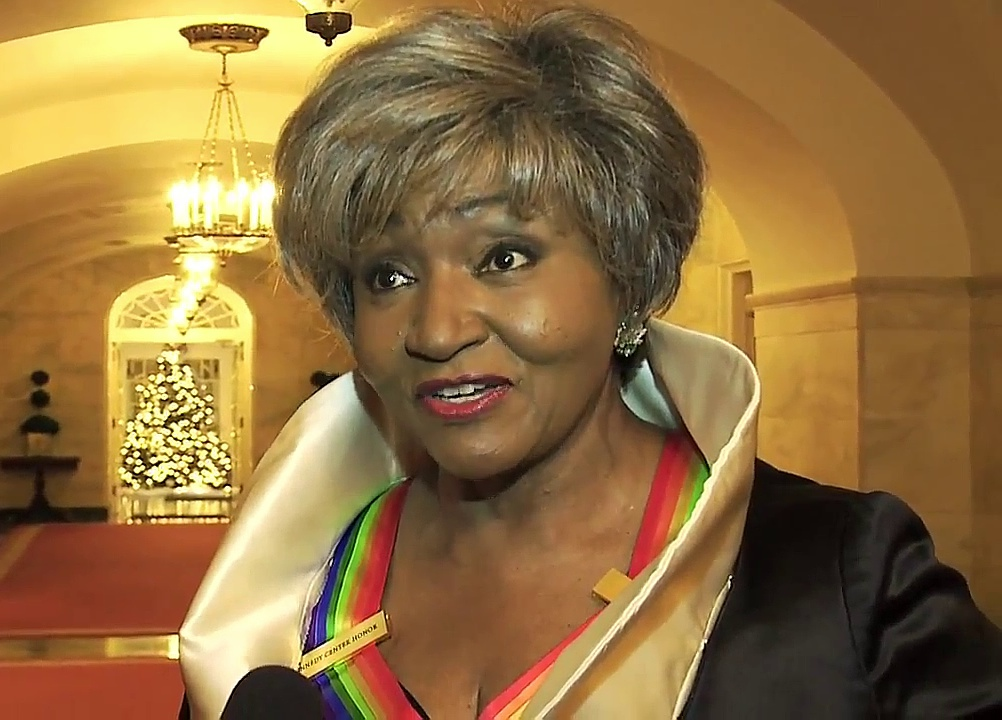
- Bumbry at the White House for the 2009 Kennedy Center Honors
- Born: Grace Ann Bumbry; January 4, 1937; St. Louis, Missouri, U.S.
- Died: May 7, 2023 (aged 86); Vienna, Austria
- Occupation: Opera singer
- Years active: 1958–2023
- Spouse: Edwin Jaeckel (m. 1963; div. 1972)
- Awards: Grammy Award; Ordre des Arts et des Lettres; Kennedy Center Honors

Grace Melzia Bumbry (January 4, 1937 – May 7, 2023) was an American opera singer, considered one of the leading mezzo-sopranos of her generation, who also ventured to soprano roles. A pioneer among African-American classical singers, she gained international acclaim as Venus in Tannhäuser at the 1961 Bayreuth Festival, the first black singer to appear there.

Bumbry's voice was rich and dynamic, possessing a wide range, and was capable of producing a very distinctive plangent tone. In her prime, she also possessed good agility and bel canto technique, as for example her rendition of Eboli in Verdi's Don Carlo in the 1970s and 1980s. She was particularly noted for her fiery temperament and dramatic intensity on stage. Later, she also became known as a recitalist and interpreter of lieder, and as a teacher. From the late 1980s on, she concentrated her career in Europe, rather than in the United States. A long-time resident of Switzerland, she spent her last years in Vienna.

== Early life and education ==
Grace Ann Melzia Bumbry was born in St. Louis, Missouri, on January 4, 1937. She was the third child of Benjamin Bumbry, a railroad freight handler, and Melzia Bumbry, a teacher. They were a family of modest means, deeply religious and highly musical. Bumbry trained in classical piano beginning at age seven, but determined she would become a singer after seeing Marian Anderson in concert. She joined the local Methodist choir at age 12, and performed as a soloist in a school production of Handel's Messiah. She listened to Anderson on radio and in recordings "at every opportunity" and was also inspired to become a singer by listening to the St. Louis Symphony conducted by Vladimir Golschmann.

Bumbry graduated from the prestigious Charles Sumner High School, the first black high school west of the Mississippi. She later credited Kenneth Billups, her voice teacher at Sumner (together with a later teacher, Armand Tokatyan of Santa Barbara) for her "vocal prowess." At age 17, at the urging of Billups and Sara Hopes, her choir director, she entered and won a teen talent contest, sponsored by St. Louis radio station KMOX. Prizes for first place included a $1,000 war bond, a trip to New York, and a scholarship to the St. Louis Institute of Music. The institution, however, excluded African Americans, and Bumbry's parents refused the offer of private voice lessons instead.

Embarrassed, the contest promoters arranged for her to appear on Arthur Godfrey's national radio broadcast Talent Scouts program, singing Verdi's aria "O don fatale" from Don Carlos. It moved Godfrey to tears. The success of that performance led to an opportunity to study at the Boston University College of Fine Arts. She later transferred to Northwestern University, where she met the famous German dramatic soprano Lotte Lehmann, who gave master classes there and was impressed with Bumbry's voice.

Lehmann invited Bumbry to study with her in Santa Barbara, California. Initially planned for just the summer of 1955, Bumbry remained on a scholarship by Lehmann for three and a half years. During this time, she studied piano and theory (with György Sándor), and then studied further interpretation and languages. During 1956-58, Bumbry attended the summer program at the Music Academy of the West in Montecito. Lehmann was also her mentor in her early career. Bumbry also studied with renowned teachers Marinka Gurewich and Armand Tokatyan. She studied singing lieder with Pierre Bernac in Paris.

== Career ==
In 1958, she was a joint winner of the Metropolitan Opera National Council Auditions with soprano Martina Arroyo; later that year, she made her recital debut in Paris. Bumbry made her operatic debut in 1960 when she sang Amneris in Verdi's Aida at the Paris Opéra; that same year she joined the Basel Opera, where she was based for four years. Her roles there included Bizet's Carmen, Dalila in Samson et Dalila by Saint-Saëns, Orfeo in Gluck's Orfeo ed Euridice, and Verdi's Lady Macbeth and Azucena.

=== International popularity ===
Bumbry gained international renown when she was cast by Wieland Wagner, Wagner's grandson, as Venus in Tannhäuser at the 1961 Bayreuth Festival, at age 24, the first black singer to appear there, which earned her the nickname "Black Venus". The cast included Victoria de los Ángeles as Elisabeth, Wolfgang Windgassen in the title role, Dietrich Fischer-Dieskau as Wolfram, and the opera was conducted by Wolfgang Sawallisch. She caused a sensation; while conservative opera-goers were outraged at the idea, Bumbry's performance was so moving that by the end of the opera she had won the audience over and they applauded for 30 minutes, necessitating 42 curtain calls.

The ensuing furor in the media made Bumbry an international cause célèbre. She was invited by Jacqueline Kennedy to sing at the White House in 1962. She returned to the White House in 1981, singing at the Ronald Reagan inauguration.

In November 1962, she starred in the title role of the musical Carmen Jones in a studio cast album recorded in London with British performers and an orchestra conducted by Kenneth Alwyn.

Bumbry made her debut at the Royal Opera House in London in 1963 as Eboli in Don Carlos, alongside Boris Christoff as the king and Tito Gobbi as Posa, in a 1958 production by Luchino Visconti. In 1964, she made her debut at the Vienna State Opera as Santuzza in Mascagni's Cavalleria rusticana, and at the Salzburg Festival as Verdi's Lady Macbeth, opposite Fischer-Dieskau's Macbeth. She made her debut at the Metropolitan Opera in New York City in 1965, again as Eboli. A reviewer noted:

She sang the 'veil song' beautifully with a light coloration not easy for mezzos to come by, but she also had the full range of stops to make "O Don Fatale" an experience in musical drama rather than merely an exercise in vocal agility.

In 1966 she appeared as Carmen opposite Jon Vickers's Don José in two different lauded productions, one with conductor Herbert von Karajan in Salzburg, and the other for her debut with the San Francisco Opera. She first appeared at La Scala in Milan as Azucena. She returned to the San Francisco Opera in 1967 for her first performance of Laura Adorno in Ponchielli's La Gioconda alongside Leyla Gencer in the title role, Renato Cioni as Enzo Grimaldi, Maureen Forrester as La Cieca and Chester Ludgin as Barnaba. Other major mezzo-soprano roles in her repertoire included the title role in Massenet's Hérodiade, Ulrica in Verdi's Un ballo in maschera, and the title role of Telemaco. In 1990, she appeared as both Cassandre and Didon in Les Troyens by Berlioz for the opening of the Opera Bastille in Paris.

=== Soprano roles ===
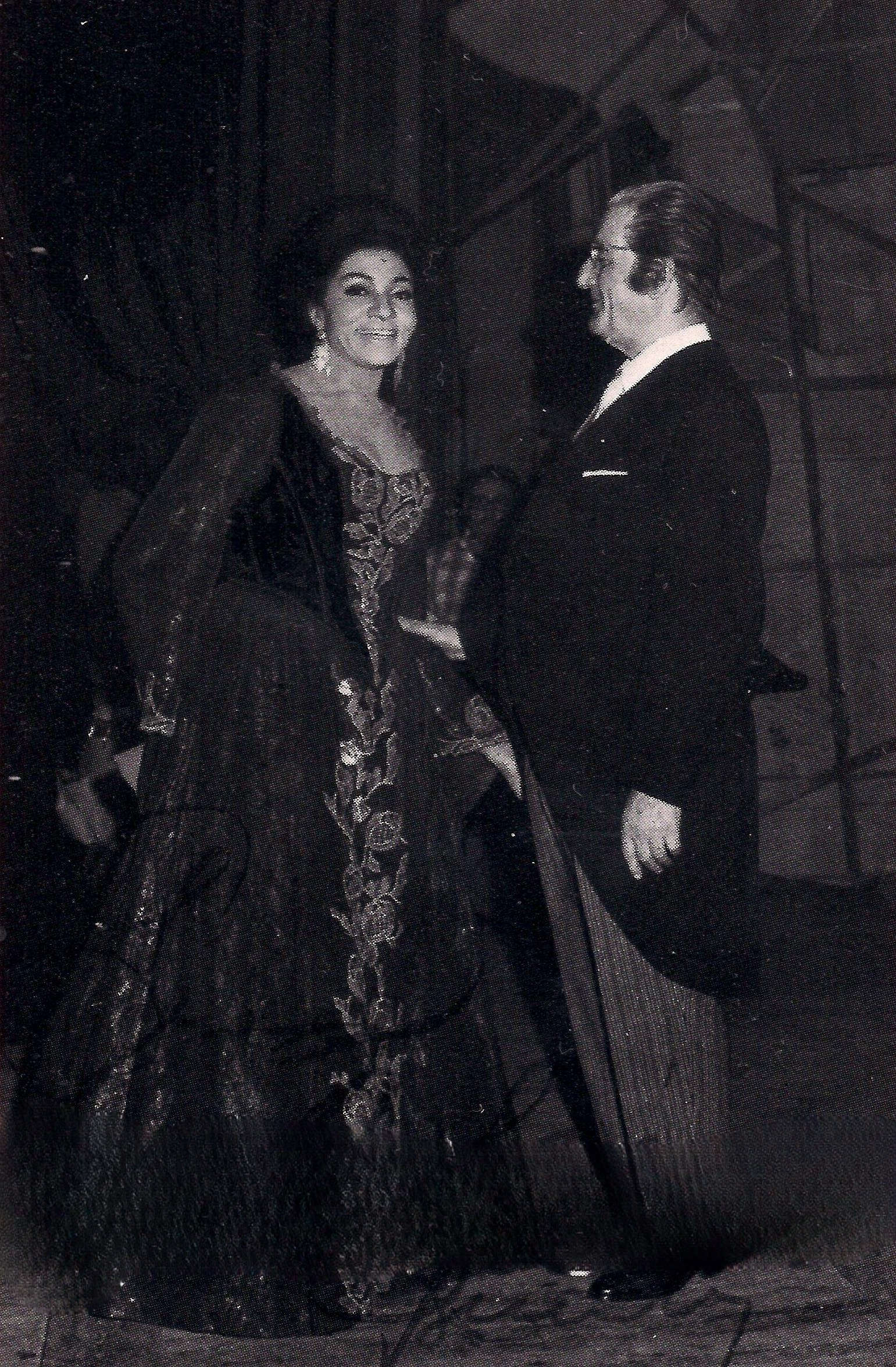
As La Gioconda with Ino Savini at the Liceu in Barcelona in 1974

In the 1970s, Bumbry, having recorded many soprano arias, began taking on soprano roles on stage. The first official soprano role was Salome by Richard Strauss at the Royal Opera House in 1970. She first appeared as Puccini's Tosca at the Metropolitan Opera in 1971, and then at La Scala in 1974. Later roles at the Metropolitan Opera included Leonora in both Il trovatore and La forza del destino and Bess in Gershwin's Porgy and Bess.

She also took on more unusual roles, such as Janáček's Jenůfa (in Italian) at La Scala in 1974, with Magda Olivero as the Kostelnička, and Ariane in Ariane et Barbe-bleue by Paul Dukas in Paris in 1975. Bumbry first appeared as Norma in 1977 in Martina Franca, Italy. The following year, she sang both Adalgisa and Norma in the same production at the Royal Opera House, first opposite Montserrat Caballé as Norma; later with Josephine Veasey as Adalgisa. She first performed as Sélika in Meyerbeer's L'Africaine in London in 1978.

She also assumed roles such as Abigaille in Verdi's Nabucco and La Gioconda. Other noted soprano roles included Chimène in Le Cid, Elisabeth in Tannhäuser, and Elvira in Verdi's Ernani.

=== Later career ===
In 1998 she was interviewed by August Everding for her career in German. In the 1990s, Bumbry founded the Grace Bumbry Black Musical Heritage Ensemble, a group devoted to preserving and performing traditional Negro spirituals; she toured with the group. She then devoted herself to teaching, judging international competitions, and to the concert stage, giving a series of recitals in 2001 and 2002 in honor of her teacher, Lotte Lehmann, including at the Théâtre du Châtelet in Paris, London's Wigmore Hall and New York's Alice Tully Hall. She was sometimes accompanied by pianist Sebastian Peschko.

In 2010, after an absence of many years from the opera stage, she performed in Scott Joplin's Treemonisha at the Theatre du Chatelet in Paris, She appeared at the Deutsche Oper Berlin as the Old Lady in Bernstein's Candide in 2012, and finally as the Countess in Tchaikovsky's Pique Dame at the Vienna State Opera on January 30, 2013, conducted by Seiji Ozawa.

Her advice to young singers was:

To strive for excellence, that's the answer. If you strive for excellence, that means that you are determined. You will find a way to get to your goal, even if it means having to turn down some really great offers. You have to live with that, as you have to live with yourself.

=== Personal life and death ===
In 1963, Bumbry married the Polish-born tenor Erwin Jaeckel. They divorced in 1972. Jack V. Lunzer, her long-term partner, died in 2016.

On October 20, 2022, Bumbry was on a flight from Vienna to New York when she had a stroke. Her health declined over the following months, and she died from related complications at a hospital in Vienna on May 7, 2023, at age 86.

== Vocal range ==
Bumbry's career in the world of opera was a remarkable and long one, if somewhat controversial. Initially, Bumbry began her career as a mezzo-soprano, but later expanded her repertoire to include many dramatic soprano roles. In the mid-1970s and 1980s she considered herself a soprano; but in the 1990s, as her career approached its twilight, she often returned to mezzo roles.

She was one of the more successful singers who have made the transition from mezzo-soprano to soprano (along with her compatriot and contemporary Shirley Verrett, as well as contemporary Welsh mezzo-soprano-turned-soprano Gwyneth Jones); however, audiences and critics were divided over whether she was a "true" soprano. Nonetheless, she sang major soprano roles at most major opera houses around the world up until the end of her operatic career in the 1990s—singing Puccini's Turandot at the Royal Opera House in 1993. Her main operatic career spanned from 1960, her debut in Paris as Amneris, to 1997 as Klytämnestra in Lyon.

== Recordings ==
Bumbry's earliest recordings are of oratorios made in the late 1950s with the Utah Symphony conducted by Maurice Abravanel, including Handel's Israel in Egypt and Judas Maccabeus. She recorded Handel's Messiah in London in 1961 conducted by Adrian Boult, alongside Joan Sutherland and Kenneth McKellar.

In aria compilations, she included both mezzo and soprano repertoire early. Much of her recorded legacy is from her mezzo period, including at least two recordings of Carmen and recordings with her as Amneris, Venus (with Anja Silja as Elisabeth, from the 1962 Bayreuth Festival), Eboli, Abigaille, Orfeo, Lady Macbeth (from the 1984 Salzburg Festival), and in Verdi's Messa da Requiem at the Royal Festival Hall in April 1964.

Bumbry made no commercially released complete studio opera recordings with her in a soprano role; there are, however, recordings of live performances of Le Cid (with the Opera Orchestra of New York), Jenůfa at La Scala, and Norma in Martina Franca. She also recorded excerpts from the musical Carmen Jones, adapted from Bizet's opera; as well as operetta such as Der Zigeunerbaron by Johann Strauß.

=== Videos ===
- The Metropolitan Opera Centennial Gala (1983), Deutsche Grammophon/PolyGram, 073 453
- James Levine's 25th Anniversary Metropolitan Opera Gala (1996), Deutsche Grammophon/Universal Classics, B0004602

== Honors ==
Among other honors, a UNESCO Award, five Distinguished Alumna Awards from the Music Academy of the West and Italy's Premio Giuseppe Verdi were bestowed on Bumbry and she was named Commandeur des Arts et Lettres by the French government. She received a Grammy Award in 1972 for Best Opera Recording. In 1992, Bumbry was inducted into the St. Louis Walk of Fame. In 2005, she was presented with The Arts for Life Lifetime Achievement Award by the Marian Anderson Award Foundation. In December 2009, she was among those honored with the 2009 Kennedy Center Honors, for her contribution to the performing arts.

On October 3, 2025, PBS profiled her with The Magic of Grace Bumbry in their Great Performances series. The documentary detailed her career and included clips of her performances.
