= Sharon Sweet =

American dramatic soprano (born 1951)

Sharon Sweet (born August 16, 1951 in Gloversville, NY) is an American dramatic soprano. Sharon Sweet has appeared in leading roles in several major venues in Europe and the United States and has made notable contributions to several recordings, in particular Lohengrin, Der Freischütz, Don Giovanni, and Il Trovatore. In 1999, she accepted a full-time teaching position at Westminster Choir College of Rider University. In a column in Opera News, Sweet stated that she made the move out of frustration with the current operatic scene which emphasized physical appearance over voice. She cited her struggles with Hashimoto's syndrome, a thyroid condition.

== Biography ==
The family of the artist came from a small town in New York. Her father had started a career as a lyric tenor, but he abandoned his career after serving in World War II. At age five, she began studying the piano, which she had to give up after an accident. As a minor, she studied singing, but then taught during one year as a music teacher at a public school. After winning the New York Metropolitan Opera auditions, she was educated at the Curtis Institute of Music in Philadelphia by Margaret Harshaw, then in New York by Marinka Gurewich. During her studies she worked as a teacher of singing and music theory at the University of New York and conducted the University Choir. At 24, she married a Presbyterian minister who came from her hometown.

She lived in Philadelphia, giving private evening of songs and arias, but 1985 finally went to West Germany. There, she attracted a sensation when she stepped in a concert in Munich's "Aida" performance in the title role. From 1986–88 she was engaged at the Opera House in Dortmund, where she sang the role as the inaugural Elizabeth in Tannhäuser. The same role she sang as a guest in Zurich and with the Deutsche Oper Berlin, the latter of which she became a member of in 1987. She toured to Japan with the Deutsche Oper in 1987 for performance of "The Ring Cycle". That same year she performed at the Paris Grand Opera as Elisabetta in Don Carlos.

In 1987-1988 Sweet appeared at the Staatsoper in Hamburg as Elisabetta in Verdi's Don Carlos, Leonora in Il Trovatore, and Elisabeth in Tannhäuser. She sang at the Staatstheater Braunschweig in 1988 as Desdemona in Verdi's Othello. At the 1987 Salzburg Festival she was heard as a soloist in the Stabat Mater by Dvorak. That same year she sang the "Gurrelieder" by A. Schoenberg in Munich under the baton of Zubin Mehta. In 1988 she appeared at the Vienna State Opera as Elisabeth in Tannhäuser and in Brussels as Norma in a concert performance of Bellini's opera.

In 1989 Sweet made her US debut at the San Francisco Opera as Aida. In 1990 she was a guest performer at the Arena di Verona as Aida and in 1991 in Montpellier as Leonora in Il Trovatore. In 1992 she appeared at the State Operas of Vienna and Dresden, and at the opera in Dallas. In 1993 she sang in the amphitheater of Caesarea as Aida and appeared at the Festival of Orange again as Leonora in "Il Trovatore" and in Munich as Desdemona in Verdi's Othello. In 1992 she sang at the Lyric Opera of Chicago as Amelia in Verdi's Un ballo in maschera.

Sweet made her Metropolitan Opera debut in 1990 as Leonora in Il trovatore, and over the next decade played 8 different Verdi, Mozart, Wagner, and Puccini roles with the company, including Lina in the Met premiere of Verdi's Stiffelio during the 1993/94 season. She also played Leonora di Vargas in a new production of the same composer's La forza del destino during the 1995/96 season; both of these productions were directed by Giancarlo del Monaco.

In 1994 Sweet made her debut at Covent Garden Opera London as Turandot by Puccini, and was there in 1995 as Aida and again in 1996 as Turandot. In 1995 she sang at the Teatro Comunale Bologna as Norma and at the State Theater in Hanover as Tosca.
