= Piano Concerto No. 4 (Prokofiev) =

1931 piano concerto by Sergei Prokofiev

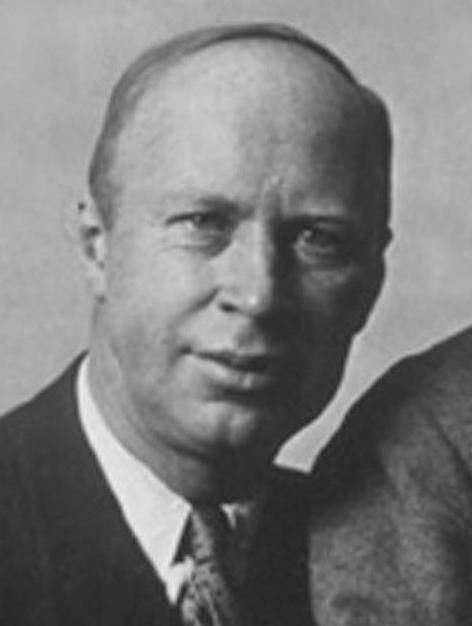
Sergei Prokofiev in 1936

Sergei Prokofiev's Piano Concerto No. 4 in B♭ major for the left hand, Op. 53, was commissioned by the one-armed pianist Paul Wittgenstein and completed in 1931.

== Background ==
Prokofiev noted the work's commission in his diary entry on 18 June 1930. "A proposal from the one-armed pianist Paul Wittgenstein to write him a concerto for the left hand. At first this seemed a ridiculous notion, but if the fee is decent, it should not take me too long." In his autobiography Prokofiev noted Wittgenstein's reaction to the piece on receiving it: "Thank you for the concerto, but I do not understand a single note and I shall not play it".

It was the only one of Prokofiev's complete piano concertos that never saw a performance during his lifetime. It was eventually premiered in Berlin on 5 September 1956 by Siegfried Rapp and the West Berlin Radio Symphony Orchestra, conducted by Martin Rich. The United States premiere was in 1958, by Rudolf Serkin and the Philadelphia Orchestra under Eugene Ormandy. The British premiere was in 1961, by Malcolm Binns.

Prokofiev expressed some interest in making an arrangement for piano two-hands and orchestra, but never went through with this idea.

== Music ==
The work is scored for solo piano (left hand), 2 flutes, 2 oboes, 2 clarinets, 2 bassoons, 2 horns, 1 trumpet, 1 trombone, bass drum and strings.

The four movements last around 25 minutes:

1. Vivace (4–5 mins) "A swift-running movement built mainly on finger technique"
2. Andante (8–13 mins) "An Andante developing with calm solemnity"
3. Moderato (8–9 mins) "A sort of sonata Allegro (although deviating from this form)"
4. Vivace (1–2 mins) "A reversion to the swift first, but in abbreviated form and piano throughout".

The concerto features neoclassical thematic material and is orchestrated in a Classical style.

The outer movements serve in a way as prelude and postlude, with the middle two comprising the bulk of the concerto. The Vivace is in rondo form, wih the Classical scales and arpeggios of the refrain contrasted with modernistic episodes. The Andante is reflective and makes rhetorical use of the strings, expanding with Romantic grandness. The remarkable third movement in modified sonata form, punctured and playful — some have said “sarcastic” — offers arresting, emphatic dialogs between the piano and the percussion section; it is marked Moderato and to be effective must be played strictly as such: not the least bit hurried. The final Vivace ends abruptly, with the piano running up pianissimo to a high B♭_{7}.

== Recordings ==
Pianist	Orchestra	Conductor	Record Company	Year of Recording	Format
Siegfried Rapp	Loh-Orchester Sondershausen (Orchester Der Deutsch-sowietischen Freundschaft)	Gerhart Wiesenhutter	ETERNA	1962	LP
John Browning	Boston Symphony Orchestra	Erich Leinsdorf	RCA Victor	1968	LP
Vladimir Ashkenazy	London Symphony Orchestra	André Previn	Decca	1975	LP
Kun-Woo Paik	Polish National Radio Symphony Orchestra	Antoni Wit	Naxos	1991	CD
Boris Berman	Royal Concertgebouw Orchestra	Neeme Järvi	Chandos	1989	CD
Michel Beroff	Leipzig Gewandhaus Orchestra	Kurt Masur	EMI	1974	LP
Abdel Rahman El Bacha	Théâtre de la Monnaie Orchestra	Kazushi Ono	Fuga Libera	2004	CD
Nikolai Demidenko	London Philharmonic Orchestra	Alexander Lazarev	Hyperion	1998	CD
Gabriel Tacchino	Orchestra of Radio Luxembourg	Louis de Froment	Vox Records	1977	LP
Gabriel Tacchino	Orchestra of Radio Luxembourg	Louis de Froment	Vox Records	2003	CD
Leon Fleisher	Boston Symphony Orchestra	Seiji Ozawa	Sony Classical	1992	CD
Vladimir Krainev	Frankfurt Radio Symphony Orchestra	Dmitri Kitajenko	Atlantic/Teldec	1993	CD
Alexander Toradze	Kirov Theatre Orchestra	Valery Gergiev	Philips	1995,1996,1997	CD
Viktoria Postnikova	USSR Ministry of Culture State Symphony Orchestra	Gennadi Rozhdestvensky	Moscow Studio Archives	1983	CD
Yefim Bronfman	Israel Philharmonic Orchestra	Zubin Mehta	Sony Classical	1993	CD
Jean-Efflam Bavouzet	BBC Philharmonic	Gianandrea Noseda	Chandos	2012	CD
Alexei Volodin	St. Petersburg Mariinsky Theatre Orchestra	Valery Gergiev	Mariinsky	2012	CD
Rudolf Serkin	Philadelphia Orchestra	Eugene Ormandy	CBS	1963	CD
Malcolm Binns	BBC Scottish Symphony Orchestra	Norman Del Mar	APR	1962 (2026)	CD
