= Carol Toscano =

American operatic soprano

Carol Toscano (born August 12, 1936) is an American operatic soprano who appeared frequently with a number of prominent American opera companies from 1962 to 1972. Afterwards she continued to perform in concerts and operas with less frequency. More recently she has appeared as a concert singer of works from the Great American Songbook. In her early career she won several prominent singing competitions.

== Life and career ==
Born and raised in the Philadelphia area, Toscano studied singing with Marinka Gurewich, Claire Gelda, and Floria Mari. In 1960 she won third prize in the Marian Anderson Singing Competition and first prize at the American Opera Auditions in Cincinnati which led to her opera debut in 1961 as Rosina in Rossini's The Barber of Seville at the Teatro Nuovo in Milan, Italy. In 1962 she won the Metropolitan Opera National Council Auditions. That same year she made her debut at Carnegie Hall as Alice in Rossini's Le comte Ory under conductor Thomas Schippers with the American Opera Society (AOS); also singing under Schippers that year as Elvira in L'italiana in Algeri at Avery Fisher Hall and at the Academy of Music in Philadelphia for the AOS.

In 1963 Toscano made her debut at the San Francisco Opera as Olympia in The Tales of Hoffmann. She returned their twice more during her career, again as Olympia in 1967 and as Gilda in Rigoletto in 1970. In 1964 she made her debut at the Lyric Opera of Chicago as Frasquita in Carmen. She appeared in several more productions with the company through 1966, playing such roles as the Celestial Voice in Aida, the first Genii in The Magic Flute, and the Naiad in Ariadne auf Naxos. In 1965 she portrayed Scollatella I in the United States premiere of Hans Werner Henze's König Hirsch at the Santa Fe Opera. She was also heard in Santa Fe that year as Fiakermilli in Arabella and Praskovya Osipovna in the United States premiere Shostakovich's The Nose.

In 1966 Toscano made her debut at the Houston Grand Opera as the First Lady to Beverly Sills' Queen of the Night in The Magic Flute. In 1967 she portrayed Ida in the United States premiere of Henze's Der junge Lord at the San Diego Opera. In 1972 she returned to Carnegie Hall to portray Jemmy in the Opera Orchestra of New York's concert performance of Gioachino Rossini's William Tell with Nicolai Gedda in the title role. In 1980 she portrayed Adina in The Elixir of Love at the Orrie de Nooyer Auditorium in Hackensack, New Jersey. In 1981 she portrayed Marzelline in Beethoven's Fidelio with the Maine Opera Association.

In 1992 Toscano was a featured soloist with The Golden Land Klezmcr Orchestra under conductor Zalmen Mlotek at Lincoln Center for the Yiddish Music Festival. In recent years she has performed in concerts of works from the Great American Songbook, including performances of the works of Rodgers and Hart with husband Robert Abelson at the Governor Henry Lippitt House in 2013.
