= Malcolm Binns =

British classical pianist

Malcolm Binns (born 29 January 1936) is a British classical pianist.

== Biography ==
Malcolm Binns was born in Nottingham, England, in 1936 and raised in Bradford. He studied music at the Royal College of Music in London from 1952 to 1956, including piano with Arthur Alexander. He made his London debut in 1957 and his Wigmore Hall debut in 1958.

Malcolm Binns 1972 on first of two acclaimed Southern Africa tours organised by Hans Adler.

He has frequently appeared at the Proms in London, starting in 1960. In 1961 he gave the British premiere of the Piano Concerto No. 4, for left hand, by Prokofiev. He appeared with the London Philharmonic Orchestra every year from 1962 until his retirement in 2016, aged 80. He has appeared with many other orchestras and conductors internationally and performed on numerous BBC radio broadcasts.

From 1961 to 1964 he was a professor at the Royal College of Music. Amongst his pupils was Robert John Godfrey of progressive rock band, The Enid. He first started working in a chamber duo with the violinist Manoug Parikian in 1966.

Binns is a noted authority on British piano music, his repertoire thereof including works by Arnold Bax, Richard Rodney Bennett, William Sterndale Bennett (he has recorded 5 of the 6 piano concertos), Frank Bridge, Benjamin Britten, Hamilton Harty, John Ireland, Patrick Piggott, Alan Rawsthorne, Edmund Rubbra and Charles Villiers Stanford.

In the 1960s Binns recorded for the World Record Club, then at its peak of popularity. In the late 1970s he performed on a set of records for the L’Oiseau-Lyre label, playing original instruments (harpsichords and fortepianos) in a range of repertoire extending up to Beethoven sonatas. He also recorded British repertoire for Lyrita, and made further recordings for Pearl, Chandos and Hyperion. His recordings include concertos by Balakirev and Rimsky-Korsakov, the Transcendental Studies of Lyapunov, works by Hummel and Medtner, as well as works from the standard repertoire by Bartók, Brahms, Chopin, Falla, Franck, Saint-Saëns, Gershwin, Grieg, Liszt, Mozart, Poulenc, Rachmaninoff, Ravel and Schumann.

Binns retained the same piano tuner, Alfred E Clark of Wandsworth through his performing career. Clark, was a manufacturer of pianos from their shop and factory on Wandsworth Road, destroyed in an air raid in WW2.

1n 1996 he celebrated his 60th birthday with an all-Chopin recital which included the complete studies from Opp. 10 and 25. APR issued a 90th birthday tribute box set in 2026.
