= Joy Clements =

American soprano (1932–2005)

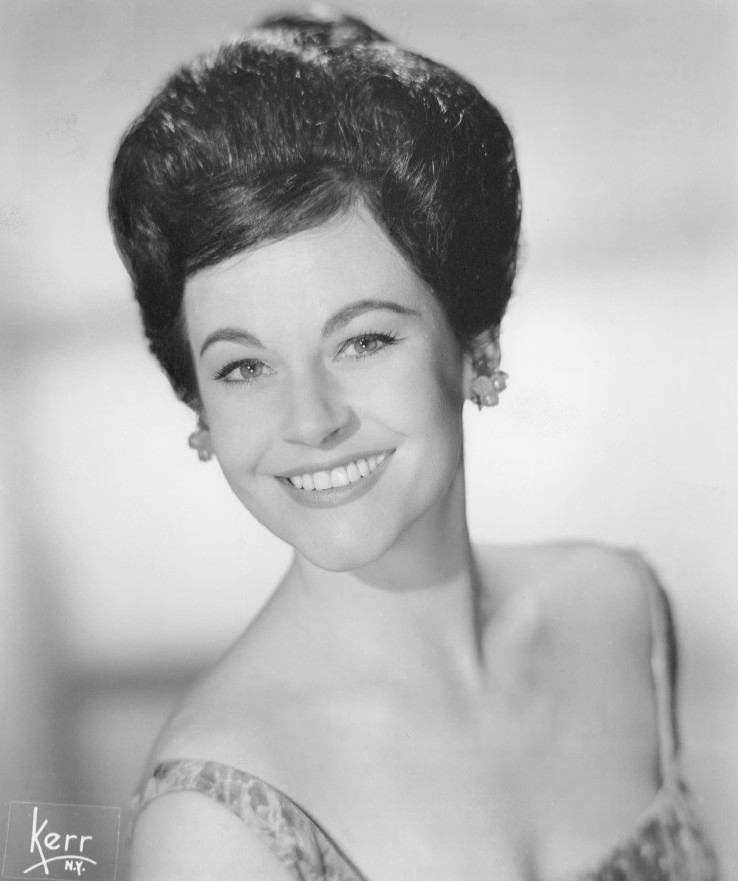
Clements in 1972.

Joy Clements (née Joyce Marie Albrecht; April 29, 1932 – October 24, 2005) was an American lyric coloratura soprano who had a substantial opera and concert career from 1956 through the late 1970s. She notably sang regularly with both the New York City Opera and the Metropolitan Opera during the 1960s through the early 1970s. She also traveled regularly for performances with opera companies and orchestras throughout the United States but only appeared in a relatively few number of performances internationally.

== Early life and career ==
Born in Dayton, Ohio to Lula Frances Albrecht (née Day) and Verne Brent Albrecht, Joyce (later Joy) first studied singing at the University of Miami in Coral Gables, Florida and, shortly after graduating, made her professional opera debut as Musetta in Puccini's La bohème with the Opera Guild of Greater Miami in 1956. She pursued graduate studies at the Philadelphia Musical Academy, where she studied from 1956 to 1958.

During this time she occasionally appeared in operas with smaller houses in the United States. In 1958 she moved to New York City and began further studies with Marinka Gurewich, whom remained her teacher for many years.

== Later career ==
In 1959 Clements signed a contract with the New York City Opera (NYCO) making her debut with the company in April of that year as Monica in Gian Carlo Menotti's The Medium with Claramae Turner in the title role and conductor Werner Torkanowsky. Over the next ten years, she was frequently heard with that company in such roles as Micaëla in Bizet's Carmen, Speranza in L'Orfeo (with conductor Leopold Stokowski), Despina in Mozart's Così fan tutte (with conductor Julius Rudel), Mary Warren in the world premiere of Robert Ward's The Crucible (with Chester Ludgin, 1961), Lauretta in Puccini's Gianni Schicchi, Rose Maurrant in Street Scene, Susanna in Mozart's Le nozze di Figaro (with Tatiana Troyanos as Cherubino), the title role in Floyd's Susannah (with Norman Treigle as the Reverend Blitch), and Yum-Yum in The Mikado among others.

Clements was first seen at the Metropolitan Opera on October 23, 1963, as the Countess Ceprano in Giuseppe Verdi's Rigoletto with Cornell MacNeil in the title role, Gianna D'Angelo as Gilda, Barry Morell as the Duke of Mantua, and conductor Fausto Cleva. She performed there for the next 10 consecutive seasons in such roles as Adele in Johann Strauss II's Die Fledermaus (with Phyllis Curtin), Amor in Orfeo ed Euridice, Giannetta in Donizetti's L'elisir d'amore (opposite Mirella Freni, then Renata Scotto), Gretel in Hänsel und Gretel (opposite Frederica von Stade), Lisa in Bellini's La sonnambula (with Dame Joan Sutherland), Musetta, and Oscar in Un ballo in maschera (with Leontyne Price, later Montserrat Caballé and Plácido Domingo) among others. Her last and 141st performance with the Met was as Marzelline in Beethoven's Fidelio on June 1, 1972, with Leonie Rysanek as Leonore, Robert Nagy as Florestan, William Dooley as Don Pizarro, and John Macurdy as Rocco.

While working with the NYCO and the Met during the 1960s and 1970s, Clements also appeared with several opera companies throughout the United States. She sang roles with the Houston Grand Opera, the Baltimore Opera Company, the Cincinnati Opera, the Pittsburgh Opera, the Philadelphia Lyric Opera Company, the San Diego Opera, the Minnesota Opera, the Fort Worth Opera, the Tulsa Opera, and Hawaii Opera Theatre among others. In 1963 she made her first international appearances with Vancouver Opera and the Israeli Opera in Tel Aviv. In 1972, she returned to the City Opera, again in Susannah. Later the same year, she appeared in Le nozze di Figaro at the Wolf Trap Farm Park, with Treigle, Curtin and Susanne Marsee in the cast. She also appeared in a number of productions with the Théâtre de la Monnaie in Brussels during the 1975–1976 season. Among the roles she sang with these companies included Bess in Porgy and Bess, Gilda in Rigoletto, Juliette in Roméo et Juliette, Lucy in The Telephone, the title heroine in Massenet's Manon, Marguerite in Faust, the title role in Flotow's Martha, Mimi in La Bohème, Olympia (the doll) in Les contes d'Hoffmann, Pamina in The Magic Flute, Shemakhan Tsaritsa in The Golden Cockerel, Violetta in La Traviata, and many of the roles she portrayed in New York City.

A highlight of her career was the July 28, 1965, Concert Version of Aaron Copland's The Tender Land, as part of the French-American Festival, with the New York Philharmonic. Clements sang the leading role of Laurie Moss, with Turner, Richard Cassilly, Treigle and Richard Fredricks also in the cast, which was conducted by the composer. Three days later, Columbia recorded an abridged version of the opera, at the Manhattan Center. (In 2000, Sony released the performance on Compact Disc.) In 1971, she made her debut performance with the Philadelphia Orchestra, singing Valencienne in a concert performance of The Merry Widow.

== Death ==
After retiring from performing in the late 1970s, Clements worked actively as a voice teacher for a number of years. She succumbed to complications from multiple sclerosis, aged 73.
