= Patrick Piggott =

English composer, pianist and musicologist (1915–1990)

Patrick Piggott (15 June 1915 – 9 May 1990) was an English composer, pianist and musicologist.

Piggott was born in Dover. He studied with Harold Craxton (piano) and Benjamin Dale (composition) at the Royal Academy of Music, and took further study with Emile Bosquet and Julius Isserlis (piano) and with Nadia Boulanger (composition) in Paris. Exempted from National Service during World War II on medical grounds, Piggott supported his sick mother and brother by performing as a pianist and teacher. After the war he was a lecturer at Cardiff University. In the 1960s he was employed by the BBC as Head of Music for the Midland Region, while continuing to tour as a concert pianist - specialisms included the music of John Field and Rachmaninov. Piggott died in Bristol on 9 May 1990.

As a pianist, Piggott was a frequent recitalist and broadcaster, but left no commercial recordings. As a composer he produced orchestral music, including the Prologue, Action and Denouement (1955), chamber music, including three string quartets (1966, 1975, 1983), and several song cycles. But he is best remembered for his virtuosic piano music, including the 24 Preludes in three sets of eight (1963, 1977, 1989). In 2005 Piggott's friend Malcolm Binns recorded the two Piano Sonatas No 1 (1961, rev, 1975) and No 2 (1978) and the third set of Preludes.

Two of his most substantial works for large forces were completed not long before his death. The Rosanes Lieder for soprano and orchestra is a Mahlerian setting of poems by the Viennese poet (and friend of Freud) Flora Rosanes. It received its first performance in 1989 by Margaret Field with the Bournemouth Symphony Orchestra. His one movement Piano Concerto The Quest (written for Malcolm Binns) also received its first broadcast in 1989.

Piggott's books include The Life & Music of John Field, 1782–1837, Creator of the Nocturne (1973), Rachmaninov Orchestral Music (BBC Music Guides, 1974), Rachmaninov (1978, Great Composers series), and The Innocent Diversion - Music in the Life and Writings of Jane Austen (1979). There is also an uncompleted biography and study of his teacher Benjamin Dale.
