= Marinka Gurewich =

Czech-American voice teacher and mezzo-soprano

Marinka Gurewich (1902, Bratislava – 23 December 1990, Manhattan) was an American voice teacher and mezzo-soprano of Jewish Czech descent. She is best remembered for teaching several successful opera singers, including Martina Arroyo, Marcia Baldwin, Grace Bumbry, Joy Clements, Ruth Falcon, Melvyn Poll, Florence Quivar, Diana Soviero, Sharon Sweet, Carol Toscano, Beverly Vaughn, and Mel Weingart among others.

Born Marinka Revész in Bratislava, Gurewich trained as a singer and pianist at the Berlin University of the Arts where she was a pupil of Lula Mysz-Gmeiner. She also studied privately with Elena Gerhardt and Anna von Mildenburg in Munich. Her career as a singer in Germany was hindered by World War II and she fled Europe for the United States in 1940. Prior to the war she had appeared in concerts and recitals in Europe. After coming to the United States, she appeared in a few recitals and concerts in New York City; but ultimately began devoting her time to teaching. During the 1960s and 1970s she taught on the voice faculties of the Manhattan School of Music and the Mannes College of Music. She continued to teach privately up until her death in 1990.
