= Martin Rich =

German conductor (1905–2000)

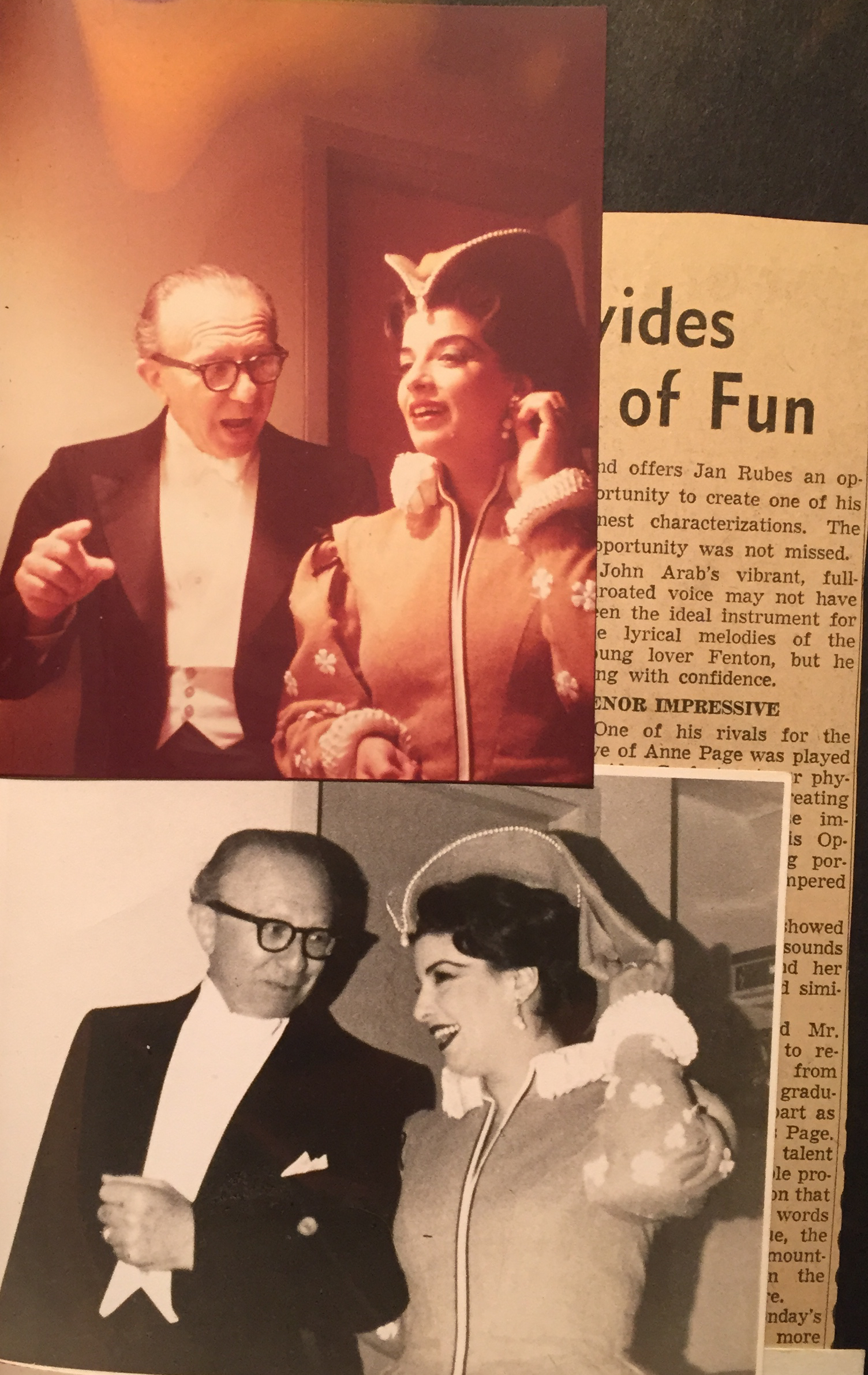
- Born: October 8, 1905; Breslau, Germany
- Died: October 23, 2000 (aged 95); Manhattan, U.S.
- Occupations: Operatic and symphonic conductor

Martin Rich (October 8, 1905 – October 23, 2000) was a German opera and symphonic conductor.

Rich played the piano from the age of 5. He studied in Berlin under Franz Schreker. He conducted at venues in Bologna in Italy, and Grant Park, in Illinois as well as the Metropolitan Opera. In 1969, he conducted the Naumburg Orchestral Concerts, in the Naumburg Bandshell, Central Park, in the summer series. From 1970 to 1986 he headed the Philharmonic Symphony of Westchester. From the mid 1980s, he taught private voice lessons at Temple University.

Martin Rich, 1959

Rich was colleagues and friends with several notable conductors and musicians. He enjoyed a friendship with conductor Leonard Bernstein and also worked alongside conductors Herbert von Karajan, Bruno Walter and William Steinberg in music festivals around the world.

Rich is known particularly as the first conductor of the Fourth Piano Concerto by Sergei Prokofiev, together with one-handed pianist Siegfried Rapp (Berlin, 1956). He often conducted The Rite of Spring. Besides being a symphonic conductor Rich was a vocal coach for singers such as Martina Arroyo. He had a wife, with whom he had a daughter.

Rich claimed that he was born left-handed but was forced him to learn to be right-handed by teachers and family. He died in 2000, aged 95.
