= Martina Arroyo =

American opera singer (1936–2026)

- Arroyo in Il trovatore, c. 1965
- Born: February 2, 1936; New York City, U.S.
- Died: October 13, 2026 (aged 90); New York City, U.S.
- Occupations: Operatic soprano; Educator
- Organizations: Metropolitan Opera
- Awards: Kennedy Center Honor
- Website: www.martinaarroyo.com

Martina Arroyo (February 2, 1936 – October 13, 2026) was an American operatic soprano who had a major international opera career from the 1960s through the 1980s. She was part of the first generation of black opera singers to achieve wide success.

Arroyo first rose to prominence in Europe, performing in the world premiere of Karlheinz Stockhausen's Momente in 1962 and as a regular leading soprano at the Zurich Opera between 1963 and 1965. She was then one of the Metropolitan Opera's leading sopranos between 1965 and 1978. During those years at the Metropolitan Opera, she was also a regular presence at the world's opera houses, performing on the stages of La Scala, Covent Garden, the Opéra National de Paris, the Teatro Colón, the Deutsche Oper Berlin, the Vienna State Opera, the Lyric Opera of Chicago, and the San Francisco Opera. She is best known for her performances of the Italian spinto repertoire, and in particular, her portrayals of Verdi and Puccini heroines, but she also appeared in world premieres in concert and opera throughout her career.

While Arroyo announced her retirement from performance in 1989, she continued to perform professionally for the next five years in a decreased capacity. Her last opera performances were in 1991 when she sang the title role in Turandot at the Staatstheater Kassel, and created the role of Miranda in the world premiere of Leslie Adams's Blake. She continued to sing recitals until as late as 1993, and in 1994 she sang in the world premiere of Carlo Franci's African Oratorio in South Africa. Her later life was devoted to teaching singing on the faculties of various universities in the United States and Europe. On December 8, 2013, Arroyo received a Kennedy Center Honor.

== Life and career ==
=== Childhood ===
Martina Arroyo was born on February 2, 1936, in Harlem, New York City. She was the younger of two children born to Demetrio Arroyo and Lucille Washington. Her brother, sixteen years her senior, grew up to become a Baptist minister. The family lived in Harlem near St. Nicholas Avenue and 111th Street, and Arroyo was educated at nearby P.S. 170 and Junior High School 101 in the New York City Public Schools system.

Arroyo's father, originally from Puerto Rico, was a mechanical engineer at the Brooklyn Navy Yard and earned a good salary. This enabled Arroyo's mother, a native of Charleston, South Carolina, to stay at home with their children. Her mother was an amateur pianist, and Arroyo learned to play the piano as a child under her mother's guidance. Her other early musical experiences were had at Baptist Temple Church in Harlem where she sang in the choir in her developing years. She later sang in the youth choir at Greater Calvary on 133rd street. She was also active in school glee clubs.

The finances of the Arroyo family were solid enough that they had the freedom to experience New York's cultural offerings, and Martina frequented museums, concerts, and the theatre in outings with her parents. It was while attending several performances of Broadway shows during the 1940s that her interest in becoming a performer blossomed. Her mother humored her dreams and allowed Arroyo to take ballet classes. She studied dance with well known Harlem teacher Mary Bruce.

=== Hunter College and vocal training ===
Arroyo attended Hunter College High School (HCHS); a highly selective and competitive school for gifted students attached to Hunter College (HC). She was accepted into the school in 1950, and graduated from HCHS in 1953. She pursued further studies at HC where she earned a Bachelor of Arts in Romance languages in 1956 at the age of nineteen. She decided to study languages so that she could better sing Italian in an opera career.

While a student at HCHS, Arroyo participated in the Hunter College Opera Workshop (HCOW); a graduate-level course which was directed by Josef Turnau. She was allowed to enroll in the workshop only after hanging around HCOW unofficially, and impressing Turnau with her performance of the Jewel Song for Faust. She learned the aria from a recording and sang with very bad French but with an impressive voice. Turnau interceded on her behalf with an appeal to HC's dean, and she was allowed to enroll in this program while a student in high school with the special permission of HC's president George N. Shuster. Not long after this Turnau contacted Marinka Gurewich, and told her the following:

I have a very strange case here, a girl I consider the greatest future talent. She has no money whatsoever. Would you do me the favor of listening to her? This means that I am doing you the favor of sending a future star to you.

She was just fourteen years old when she started voice lessons with Gurewich. Gurewich was Arroyo's sole voice teacher, continuing in this capacity until Gurewich's death in 1990. Turnau did not instruct her singing, but did teach her dramatic acting and other stage skills while she participated in HCOW during her high school and college years.

In May 1955 Arroyo starred in the premiere of Jan Meyerowitz's Bad Boys in School which was staged by HCOW. A review in The San Francisco News said it was an error to call it an opera rather than a musical, but that it "had the distinction of having a remarkably clever, gifted and rich voiced young actress named Martina Arroyo who should make a hit on Broadway one of these days". She later starred in HWOC's production of Darius Milhaud's Les malheurs d'Orphée in May 1958.

=== Early professional life ===
While studying voice with Gurewich as a teenager, Arroyo did not take her voice lessons very seriously and viewed singing more as a hobby. This was partly due to the lack of black women working in professional operas in the United States at that time, and her perception that "opera wasn't a real possibility". At that point in time Marian Anderson had not yet broken the color barrier at the Metropolitan Opera ("the Met"); a historic moment which occurred in 1955.

Upset by Arroyo's lack of commitment, Gurewich threatened to drop her as a student while she was studying at HC. This event galvanized Arroyo into taking her studies much more seriously, and from then on she pursued her vocal training with focused energy. Of this experience she stated in an interview:

It was a real wake-up call. Up to then, I must have been, in my mind, treating singing as a hobby, a lark—something I loved that I was dabbling in.

In the mid to late 1950s, Arroyo worked while studying singing. On the advice of her mother, she began her professional life working as a teacher after graduating from HC. She obtained a license to teach high-school literature, and taught for one year at P.S. 45 in the Bronx. She simultaneously enrolled in graduate studies at New York University (NYU), and continued to attend opera workshops at HC while studying singing privately with Gurewich. At NYU she pursued a master's degree in comparative literature. Her dissertation was on Ignazio Silone.

Although Arroyo liked teaching high school English, the time demands made her realize she could not continue to study music and work as an educator, contemporaneously. She left that position, and took a job as a social worker at the East End Welfare Center operated by the New York City Welfare Department. She worked as a social worker for approximately two years in c. 1956 – c. 1957, and despite having a busy load of more than 100 people she found it easier to balance her music studies with this job. She found the work fulfilling and stated of the experience, "My life had been centered on music for so long, and suddenly there I was, deeply involved in other people's problems."

=== Early professional performances ===
Arroyo made her recital debut at Carnegie Recital Hall on January 19, 1957. She was approached by concert manager Thea Dispeker after this recital, and she offered to represent Arroyo for free until her career was established. She was introduced to Dispeker by Turnau. This began a relationship which would last for decades with Dispeker serving as the manager for her career. Later that year she auditioned for the Met but was not accepted.

Arroyo rebounded in the 1958 Metropolitan Opera Auditions of the Air where she won a $1,000 cash prize in the contest held in March that year. The competition also provided a scholarship to the Met's Kathryn Long School (KLS), where she studied drama with dramatic soprano and opera director Rose Landver, a teacher she had previously worked with at HCOW. She also studied German, English diction, and fencing at this school.

While at KLS, Arroyo was offered the role of the first Coryphaeus in the U.S. premiere of Ildebrando Pizzetti's Murder in the Cathedral. The work was scheduled for performance at the Empire State Music Festival at Ellenville, New York in August 1958, but bad weather canceled the event. The concert was rescheduled for a performance at Carnegie Hall where it was performed on September 17, 1958. This marked Arroyo's first professional appearance singing in an opera. Harold C. Schonberg in The New York Times wrote of her performance, "Martina Arroyo is a gifted soprano who appears to have remarkable potential, and she sang with a voice of amplitude and lovely color."

In December 1958 Arroyo sang the role of Israelitish Woman in Handel's Judas Maccabaeus with the Utah Symphony and Grace Bumbry as the Israelitish Man. This performance was recorded and released the following year on Westminster Records. In January 1959, she sang a supporting role in Gluck's Iphigénie en Tauride in a concert version with the Little Orchestra Society at Town Hall with Gloria Davy in the title role. She returned to Salt Lake City in December 1959 to appear with the Utah Symphony again as the Widow in Mendelssohn's Elijah with Norman Treigle in the title role.

She made her debut at the Met in the small off-stage role of the Celestial Voice in Verdi's Don Carlo on March 14, 1959, with Eugenio Fernandi in the title role, Leonie Rysanek as Elisabetta, Robert Merrill as Rodrigo, and Nell Rankin as Princess Eboli. This was the beginning of what opera historian Clyde T. McCants described as her "first Met career" in which she played comprimario roles through 1962. She returned to the Met in the 1960–1961 season for further performances in Don Carlo, and in the 1961–1962 season performed roles in Wagner's Ring cycle, including Woglinde in Das Rheingold, Ortlinde in Die Walküre, the Forest Bird in Siegfried, and the Third Norn and Woglinde in Götterdämmerung.

=== Early international career and marriages ===
After having made her Met debut, Arroyo was advised by the Met's director Rudolf Bing to go to Europe because she would have better performance opportunities there. She traveled to Europe for the first time in 1959 on a tour organized by the United States Information Service as part of a propaganda campaign of the "America Houses". While performing in Italy that year she met her future husband, professional violist Emilio Poggioni. She married Poggioni in 1961 in New York City. Their marriage lasted about ten years and ended in divorce. She later married French banker Michel Maurel. They remained married until his death in 2011.

In the early 1960s Arroyo divided her time between work as a concert soprano in the United States and appearing in concert and opera in Europe. In May 1960 she appeared with the Dessoff Choirs at Carnegie as a soloist in Bach's Mass in B minor. In February 1961 she gave a recital at Town Hall.

Momente, Arroyo next to Stockhausen, Donaueschingen, 1965

She performed the world premiere of Karlheinz Stockhausen's Momente at the Westdeutscher Rundfunk in 1962, of a partial version. She was also the vocal soloist in the first performance of the expanded version at the Donaueschingen Festival in October 1965, which was recorded for WERGO and Nonesuch, earning a Diapason d'Or award.

In April 1963 Arroyo performed the world premiere of Samuel Barber's Andromache's Farewell with the New York Philharmonic (NYP) led by Thomas Schippers. This piece was commissioned for performance by NYP in celebration of the NYP's opening season at Lincoln Center, and it was recorded by the orchestra with Arroyo. She sang again with the NYP later that year as the soprano soloist in When Lilacs Last in the Dooryard Bloom'd under the baton of its composer, Paul Hindemith, and in Beethoven's Symphony No. 9 under Leonard Bernstein.

At European theatres in the early 1960s Arroyo worked initially in smaller parts, or in larger roles in obscure or avant-garde operas. She formed a close partnership with Martin Rich who served as her vocal coach in preparing opera repertoire for years. She gained a reputation as a reliable singer of difficult parts but failed to become a star. During this period she spent six to eight months a year performing abroad in various locations; once performing in 45 different cities over a period of 48 days. She repeated Barber's Andromache's Farewell for its European debut with the Stuttgarter Philharmoniker in 1963.

Arroyo's first major break in opera came when she was offered a contract to join the Zurich Opera (ZO) in 1963. This was the first company that hired her for leading soprano roles on a recurring basis. She made her debut there in the title role of Verdi's Aida where she was received enthusiastically. She was a resident artist in Zurich Opera until the end of 1965. She befriended several American colleagues at the ZO; among them Leontyne Price, Reri Grist, and James McCracken and his wife Sandra Warfield. At this point in her career she maintained apartments in both New York City and Zurich.

Verdi's Aida became an important role for Arroyo early in her career, serving as a calling card for her at many major opera houses during the 1960s. She sang the role for her first appearance at the Hamburg State Opera in 1963 and at both the Deutsche Oper Berlin and the Vienna State Opera in 1964. In June 1964 she sang an all-American program with the Vienna Philharmonic with Franz Allers as the conductor.

Arroyo appeared with the NYP again in January 1965 in Rossini's Stabat Mater with Beverly Wolff and Justino Diaz as fellow soloists. On October 24, 1965, she sang with the NYP in the world premiere of Benjamin Britten's Voices for Today to mark the 20th anniversary of the United Nations.

=== Second career at Metropolitan Opera ===
Arroyo as Leonora in Il trovatore

In early 1965 Arroyo traveled back to New York City to visit her family. On February 2, 1965, she got a phone call from Rudolf Bing asking her to step in for Birgit Nilsson for an impending performance of Aida at the Metropolitan Opera. Initially Arroyo thought it was a prank call, but the unexpected opportunity was genuine. When it was announced to the audience at the Met on February 4, 1965, that the role of Aida would be sung not by Nilsson but by Arroyo, audible groans were heard in the house. However, by the end of the evening the audience was completely won over and giving her an enthusiastic standing ovation. The performance received rave reviews with Raymond Ericson writing in the magazine of The New York Times that Arroyo had "one of the most gorgeous voices before the public today".

The success of this Aida performance led to Arroyo being offered a Met contract to join the roster of the company's principal sopranos which extended for several years. She became a favorite performer with Met audiences. In the 1965–1966 Met season she sang a lauded performance of Elisabetta in Don Carlo, one performance of which was recorded for the Metropolitan Opera radio broadcasts. In her second career at the Met she particularly excelled in the dramatic soprano repertoire from the Italian literature; with the operas of Giuseppe Verdi in particular serving as her foundation. According to Karl-Josef Kutsch and Leo Riemens she drew acclaim at the Met for portrayals of Amelia in Verdi's Un ballo in maschera, Donna Anna in Mozart's Don Giovanni, Lady Macbeth in Verdi's Macbeth, Leonora in Verdi's La forza del destino, Liù in Puccini's Turandot, and the title roles in La Gioconda and Tosca among other parts.

Other Italian opera roles Arroyo sang at the Met included Cio-Cio-San in Giacomo Puccini's Madama Butterfly, Elvira in Verdi's Ernani, Leonora in Verdi's Il trovatore, Maddalena in Umberto Giordano's Andrea Chénier, and Santuzza in Pietro Mascagni's Cavalleria rusticana. While Italian literature was her main emphasis, she also sang repertoire outside of this area. In 1968 she was the first black woman in the global history of opera to portray Elsa in Wagner's Lohengrin when it was staged at the Met.

After 1978, Arroyo's appearances at the Met became infrequent. Her absence from the Met over the next five years was the result of a combination of factors. Small tumors pressing on her spine were making stage movement difficult, which limited the roles she would play in the later part of her career. Additionally, the death of her mother brought personal struggles, and Rudolph Bing's departure from the Met brought many changes at the opera house which impacted casting choices and repertoire.

Arroyo returned to the Met in 1983 to sing "Fu la sorte" from Aida (with Mignon Dunn) for the company's Centennial Gala. Her final performances with the company were in 1986 when she returned first as Santuzza and then as Aida; making her last appearance and 199th performance at the Met as the Ethiopian princess on October 31, 1986. She later returned to the Met to host the 2002 finals concert of the Metropolitan Opera National Council Auditions.

=== Later international opera career ===
During her years at the Met, Arroyo would frequently travel to perform at other houses both in the United States and internationally. In 1968 she made her first appearance in the United Kingdom as Valentine in a London concert performance of Meyerbeer's Les Huguenots. Later that year she made her debut at the Royal Opera House (ROH) as Aida, and sang the role of Amelia in Un ballo in maschera at the Prague National Opera. She had a great success at the ROH in 1970 as Leonora in Il trovatore. She also sang Aida for her first appearance with the Philadelphia Lyric Opera Company in February 1968.

Arroyo sang Amelia in Un ballo in maschera for her debuts with both the San Francisco Opera (1971) and the Lyric Opera of Chicago (1972). She returned to Chicago to sing her first Amelia Grimaldi in Verdi's Simon Boccanegra in 1974. In 1972 she sang Aida at La Scala opposite Plácido Domingo as Radames. In 1973 she made her first appearances at the Opéra National de Paris and the Teatro Colón in Buenos Aires; returning again the latter theater in 1974 as Hélène in Les vêpres siciliennes. Her 1974 appearances also included performances at the Hamburg State Opera, and the title role in Tosca at the ROH. She returned to the ROH in 1976 as Verdi's Amelia, and sang with Luciano Pavarotti for that theater's gala concert with French president Valéry Giscard d'Estaing and prime minister James Callaghan in attendance.

In 1977 illness prevented Arroyo's debut with the Opera Company of Philadelphia as Senta in Wagner's The Flying Dutchman and Rachel Mathes sang the part instead. She later sang the role with Opera Grand Rapids in 1989. In 1979 she made her debut with Michigan Opera Theatre as Leonora in Verdi's Il trovatore.

She returned to the ROH in 1978 as Leonara in Il trovatore and in 1979 as Élisabeth in Don Carlos as a last minute replacement for Sylvia Sass. She remained very busy at the world's major opera houses through 1979 singing mostly Verdi, Puccini, and Strauss heroines and other roles from the lirico-spinto repertoire. Other opera houses where she performed as a guest artist included the Bavarian State Opera, Grand Theatre, Warsaw, the National Theatre in Belgrade, and the Staatsoper Stuttgart.

In 1981 Arroyo sang a concert version of La forza del destino at the BBC Proms with the BBC Symphony Orchestra led by Peter Glossop. She previously performed that opera at the ROH in 1973. In 1984 she was one of six rotating sopranos to portray Aida in a massive production staged at the newly built Palais Omnisports de Paris-Bercy in France that was estimated to have been seen by more than 200,000 people. In 1988 she replaced an ailing Grace Bumbry as Aida in a production at the Earls Court Exhibition Centre in England which was staged to raise money for the Prince's Trust. Some of the other stage roles she performed on the international stage during her career included Agathe in Der Freischütz, Donna Elvira in Don Giovanni, Elisabetta in Don Carlos, Lisa in The Queen of Spades, and Rezia in von Weber's Oberon.

In 1989 Arroyo announced her retirement from performance, and from this point her performances were less frequent. In 1991 she portrayed the title role in Puccini's Turandot at the Staatstheater Kassel; a role she had sung earlier with the Seattle Opera in 1987. She also performed in the world premiere of Leslie Adams's Blake in 1991 with the composer specifically creating the role of Miranda for Arroyo. She performed Mahler's Rückert-Lieder with the Orpheus Chamber Orchestra in 1992. She continued to perform recitals until as late as 1993 when she sang at her alma mater, Hunter College. In January 1994 she performed in the world premiere of Carlo Franci's African Oratorio in South Africa with the Transvaal Philharmonic Orchestra.

=== Concert performances ===
Arroyo had an important career as a concert soprano. In 1962, she was a soloist in Handel's Messiah with the National Symphony Orchestra led by Howard Mitchell. In 1964 she was a soloist in both Dvořák's Requiem and Handel's Israel in Egypt with the Musica Aeterna Orchestra and Chorus (MAOC) and conductor Frederic Waldman at the Metropolitan Museum of Art. She later performed with MAOC and Waldman as a soloist in Rossini's Petite messe solennelle (1966). Wagner's Wesendonck Lieder (1967), Strauss's Four Last Songs (1967), Dvořák's Te Deum (1969), Mendelssohn's Die erste Walpurgisnacht (1969), Fauré's Requiem (1969), and Dvořák's Requiem (1971, Carnegie Hall),

She performed Beethoven's Symphony No. 9 on tour with the Philadelphia Orchestra (PO) and Eugene Ormandy in 1966. She subsequently performed with the PO in performances of Beethoven's Missa solemnis (1967), Poulenc's Gloria (1968), and Verdi's Requiem (1977). In January 1967 she was a soloist in the Clarion Concert hosted by senator Robert F. Kennedy at Carnegie Hall which raised funds to help the victims of the 1966 flood of the Arno that devastated the city of Florence, Italy. In August 1967 she performed in Verdi's Requiem at the Tanglewood Music Festival with the Boston Symphony Orchestra led by Erich Leinsdorf.

In July 1968 Arroyo performed Verdi's Requiem with the Israel Philharmonic Orchestra led by Zubin Mehta in the city of Bethlehem on the West Bank in a concert sponsored by Palestinian politician Elias Bandak who was then mayor of Bethlehem. Arroyo was later a member of the executive committee of the Writers and Artists for Peace in the Middle East, a pro-Israel group, in 1976. In January 1970 she performed with conductor Abraham Kaplan and the Camerata Singers and Symphony Orchestra at Philharmonic Hall. The following April she sang an all Strauss program with Pittsburgh Symphony Orchestra (PSO) led by Henry Mazer at Carnegie Hall. She was also a soloist in Verdi's Requiem with Bernstein conducting the London Symphony Orchestra in a sold-out 1970 concert at Royal Albert Hall.

In 1971 Arroyo performed the role of Cleopatra in excerpts from Barber's Antony and Cleopatra with the NYP and Bernstein conducting at Lincoln Center. She also sang with the NYP that year in a concert honoring Dimitri Mitropoulos's 1,000th appearance as conductor in which she performed in Mahler's Resurrection Symphony. In 1972 she performed at the Casals Festival. In 1974 she performed in Verdi's Requiem at the Edinburgh International Festival with conductor Carlo Maria Giulini. In 1975 she performed as a guest for one song in a concert of spirituals given by the Heritage Society Chorus at Avery Fisher Hall as a benefit for the Harlem School of the Arts. That same year she sang at the memorial mass for tenor Richard Tucker; the first time a mass for a Jew was given at St. Patrick's Cathedral.

In 1976 Arroyo gave a recital at Avery Fisher Hall. In 1978 she performed a concert of Puccini and Verdi arias with the PSO at the Temple University Music Festival. In 1985 she returned to Carnegie Hall to perform the final "Immolation Scene" from Götterdämmerung with the National Orchestra of New York.

Along with Betty Allen and Roberta Peters, Arroyo sang for the re-opening of Weill Recital Hall in January 1987. Later that year she performed at the Carnival of Venice. On July 4, 1988, she opened the Geneva Music Festival in a concert of American music with Eastman Philharmonia; beginning that year's concert series on the theme of "Made in the U.S.A." In 1989 she was a soloist with the Philharmonic Symphony of Westchester, and reprised Barber's Andromache's Farewell with the American Composers Orchestra.

=== Teaching career and other work ===
In 1976 Arroyo was appointed to the board of the National Endowment for the Arts. She was appointed by President Gerald R. Ford, and served six years on the NEA Board.

She maintained a home in Zurich until joining the faculty of Louisiana State University (LSU) upon her retirement. After retiring from singing in 1989 she amassed significant teaching credits, including stints at LSU, UCLA, University of Delaware, Wilberforce University, and the International Sommerakademie-Mozarteum in Salzburg. She was appointed to the faculty of the Jacobs School of Music at Indiana University in 1993, where she achieved the title of Distinguished Professor before retiring as Distinguished Professor Emerita in May 2007. With Willard L. Boyd, former President of the University of Iowa, she co-authored the "Task Force Report on Music Education in the U.S."

Arroyo in 2010

While teaching at Indiana University, she developed a course on opera role preparation. The success of this course led to the founding of The Martina Arroyo Foundation (MAF) in 2003; an organization dedicated to the development of emerging young opera singers. This organization offers an intensive six-week long workshop, "Prelude to Performance", in the summers in which students learn operas and then perform them. AMF has presented operas with young developing singers at the Kaye Playhouse, Hunter College. Some notable singers who performed in productions staged by the MAF include Ryan Speedo Green and Meghan Picerno. During the Covid-19 pandemic this organization released several video recitals of its young singers as a way to support their careers at a time when live performances were on hold.

Arroyo taught masterclasses at several institutions; including the Greenwich House Music School (1986), Duquesne University (1922), Utah Opera (1992), the University of Maryland (1995) University of Northern Iowa (1998), Kentucky State University (2000), the Mannes College of Music (2001), Portland State University (2005), University of Cincinnati – College-Conservatory of Music (2006), Hunter College (2011), and Michigan State University (2017). In the 2000s she was involved with the Artist-In-Training program at the Opera Theatre of St. Louis; serving as both a teacher and as a judge for that organization's young artist competition. She was also a judge for the George London Competition and the Tchaikovsky International Competition.

She also served as a Trustee Emerita of the Hunter College Foundation, and as an artistic adviser to the Harlem School of the Arts. She served for 20 years on the Board of Trustees of Carnegie Hall. Along with Marilyn Horne, she gave a spoken tribute at Carnegie Hall's 125th anniversary concert in May 2016.

=== Death ===
Martina Arroyo died at her home in Manhattan on October 13, 2026, at the age of 90.

== Critical assessment ==
According to Contemporary Black Biography, Arroyo "emerged in the 1960s as part of a vanguard of performers who broke down opera's color barrier", and "as one of the few black opera stars at the time, she helped usher in a new era in opera—an era filled with greater opportunities for black opera singers." Regarding her perception of this achievement, Arroyo stated in an interview that she herself did not experience or was not aware of discrimination impacting her career. She said

People knew who I was and what I looked like when they hired me, so it was no surprise to them. I didn't have any problems as a Black singer that I knew of. Either I was invited to perform and went, or I wasn't invited. I sang where I wanted, and that is how my career grew.

Clyde T. McCants stated that Arroyo possessed a "fully mature, superbly trained, and disciplined soprano, gleaming at the top, but a trifle weak in the lower notes. The basic vocal tint was dark, reminiscent at its best of Rosa Ponselle, and she could muster both the power to surmount an orchestral climax and a pianissimo that carried in spite of its delicacy to the furthest reaches of a large auditorium." He further wrote that Arroyo's "interpretations tended to be dramatically convincing but generalized in nature without that special psychological penetration that marked the performances of for example, Maria Callas and Renata Scotto. Vocally, however, she could outsing most of her colleagues in her chosen repertoire."

Alan Blyth stated that Arroyo's "rich, powerfully projected voice, heard to greatest advantage in the Verdi spinto roles, was flexible enough for Mozart". Music critic Hubert Saal stated that Arroyo was "the reigning queen of Verdi opera, a dramatic soprano with a voice capable of expanding to slingshot power and of diminishing to kittenish pathos". According to critic John Rockwell, Arroyo experienced a "growing lack of technical ease" in her singing during the 1980s.

In public, Arroyo presented as what Rosalyn M. Story described as a "down-to-earth unpretentious star, an 'anti-diva' characterized by jovial wit, warmth, and self-deprecating humor". While the press reported a bitter rivalry between Arroyo and her great contemporary, fellow African-American spinto Leontyne Price, Arroyo insisted that this was not reality and manufactured by the press. Once, when a Met doorman greeted her as "Miss Price", she sweetly replied, "No, honey, I'm the other one." Conscious of how her size sometimes became a talking point, she jokingly referred to herself in interviews as "Madame Butterball".

== Recordings and other media appearances ==
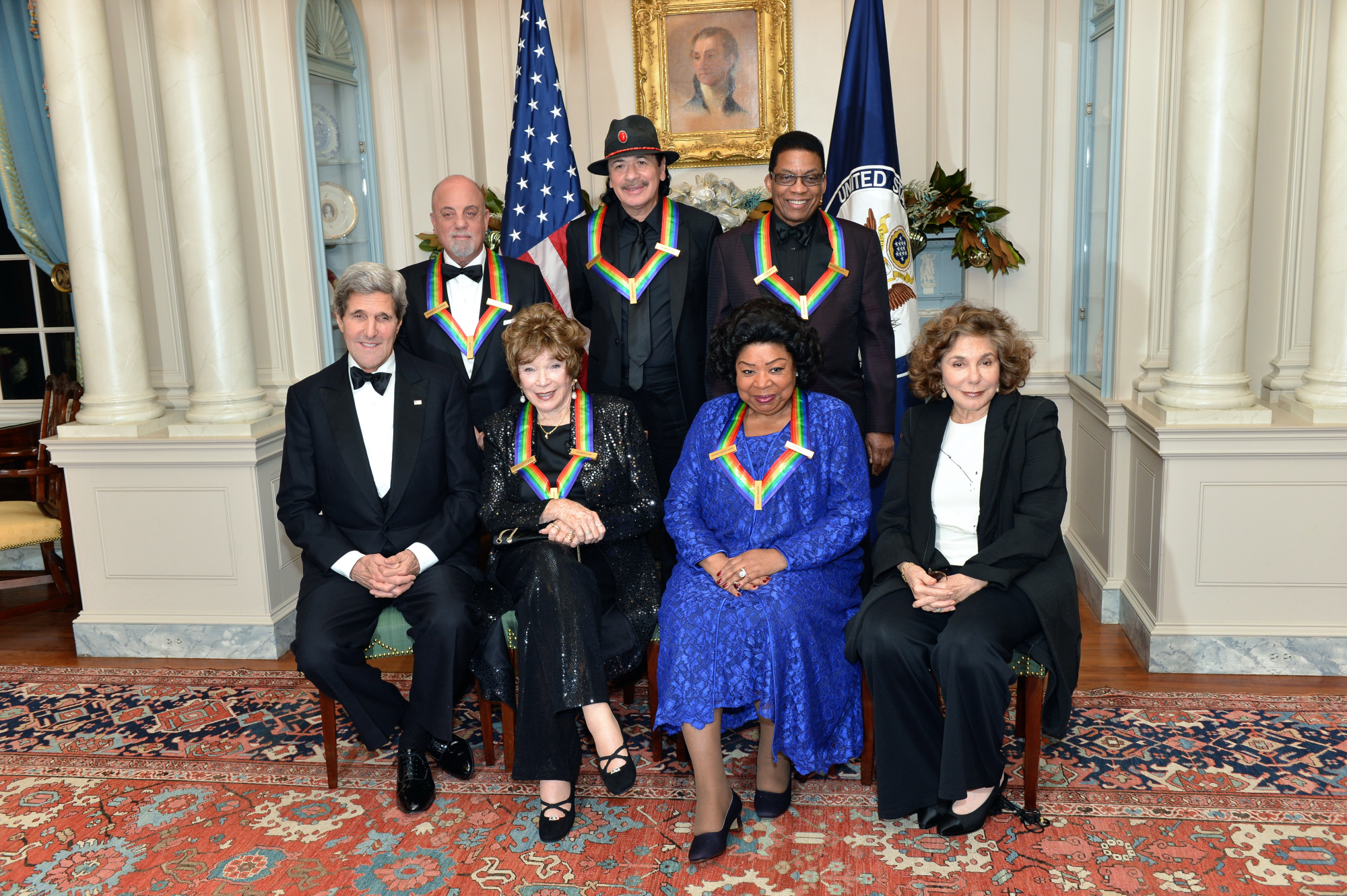
U.S. Secretary of State John Kerry and Mrs. Teresa Heinz Kerry pose for a photo with the 2013 Kennedy Center honorees – Shirley MacLaine, Martina Arroyo, Billy Joel, Carlos Santana, and Herbie Hancock at the U.S. Department of State in Washington, D.C., on December 7, 2013

According to Alan Blyth, Arroyo's most admired recordings are complete opera albums of the roles of Hélène in I vespri siciliani (RCA), Amelia in Un ballo in maschera (HMV), Leonora in La forza del destino (HMV), and the tile role in Aida (HMV). Her Aida recording was recorded live at La Scala in 1972 with conductor Claudio Abbado. Many of the roles Arroyo performed on stage she never recorded in their entirety, but individual arias or excerpts from her parts in Andrea Chenier, Don Carlos, Macbeth, Madama Butterfly, and La Gioconda were recorded. A Russian radio broadcast recording of La forza del destino also exists in master copies.

Arroyo recorded both Donna Elvira and Donna Anna on two separate opera recordings of Don Giovanni; singing Elvira under Karl Böhm for Deutsche Grammophon and Donna Anna under Colin Davis for Philips. In 1969 she made a complete opera recording of the role of Valentine in Les Huguenots (Decca); notably the first commercial recording of the opera which also featured Joan Sutherland. In 1981 she recorded the role of Santuzza in Cavalleria rusticana.

Outside of opera, Arroyo made recordings of several oratorios and other works from the concert literature. For Columbia she recorded Rossini's Stabat mater with the New York Philharmonic (NYP) and Thomas Schippers; Beethoven's Missa solemnis with the Philadelphia Orchestra and conductor Eugene Ormandy (1967); Beethoven's Ninth Symphony with the NYP and Leonard Bernstein (1970); and Verdi's Requiem with the London Symphony Orchestra and Bernstein (1970).

For Deutsche Grammophon she made recordings of Mahler's Eighth Symphony and Samson. For MCA Records she recorded Gabriel Fauré's Requiem, and for WERGO she recorded Stockhausen's Momente. Her other recordings include Handel's Judas Maccabeus, and 20th-century music, including Schoenberg's Gurre-Lieder (with the Danish State Radio Orchestra), and the African Oratorio by Carlo Franci (1994).

As her fame grew she became a recognizable figure in American culture through many appearances on national television broadcasts. In 1964 she performed on national network television for a concert with the CBS Symphony Orchestra and conductor Alfredo Antonini in the episode "Feliz Borinquen" on the program CBS Repertoire Workshop. In 1970 she performed on the National Educational Television program Fanfare with the Los Angeles Philharmonic and Zubin Mehta in Beethoven's Ninth Symphony.

Arroyo portrayed herself in a 1975 episode of The Odd Couple titled "Your Mother Wears Army Boots". The episode featured her performing an aria from Il trovatore and the popular song "For Once in My Life". She also recorded the role of Bess in Porgy and Bess with Ingvar Wixell as Porgy for a Swedish television broadcast in the 1970s, and made 20 appearances with Johnny Carson on The Tonight Show.

== Honors ==
In 1976, Arroyo was appointed by President Gerald Ford to the National Council of the Arts in Washington, D.C. In 1981 she was awarded an honorary doctorate by the City University of New York. In 1985 she was inducted into the Academy of Vocal Arts' Hall of Fame for Great American Opera Singers.

Arroyo was elected a fellow of the American Academy of Arts and Sciences in 2000. She received a 2010 Opera Honors Award from the National Endowment for the Arts. In 2020, she was inducted into the American Classical Music Hall of Fame.

== See also ==
- List of Puerto Ricans
- History of women in Puerto Rico
