= Philharmonic Symphony of Westchester =

Philharmonic Symphony of Westchester was a professional symphony orchestra based in Westchester County, NY.

It was founded in 1945 and in its best years enjoyed to have Isaac Stern, Andre Watts, Van Cliburn and Martina Arroyo as guest soloists. Martin Rich was artistic director from 1970 to 1986, then Robert Kogan from 1987 to 1989 when the orchestra was disbanded. Westchester Philharmonic eventually replaced it.
