= List of King George V Playing Fields in Surrey =

Surrey
Location	Formal name	Local name (if any)	National Grid Reference	Dates		External links
Location	Formal name	Local name (if any)	National Grid Reference	Purchase	Opening	External links
Copthorne	King George V Playing Field (Copthorne)		TQ 319 397		1961	
Dorking	Deepdene Avenue King George's Field (North Holmwood)		TQ 174 477		1950	
Dorking	Chart Downs King George's Field (North Holmwood)		TQ 176 481		2008	
Dunsfold	King George's Field		TQ 004 368		1937	
Effingham	King George's Field (Effingham)		TQ 121 536		1947	
Epsom	King George's Field (Long Grove Park)	Long Grove Park	TQ 200 618		2002	
Felbridge	King George's Field (Felbridge)		TQ 366 397		1961	
Godalming	King George's Field (Godalming)	Broadwater Park	SU 979 453		1938	
Hascombe	King George's Field (Hascombe)		SU 997 399		1939	
Leatherhead	King George's Field (Leatherhead)		TQ 165 567		1938	
Oxted	King George's Field (Coldshott)	Coldshott Open Space	TQ 403 504		1961	
Oxted	King George V Playing Field (Hurst Green)	Mill Lane Playing Field	TQ 398 509		1961	
Oxted	King George V Playing Field (Old Oxted)	Bushey Croft Playing Field	TQ 384 519		1961	
Reigate	South Park (Reigate)		TQ 247 487		1934	
Stoneleigh	Auriol Park		TQ 213 649		1947	
Sunbury-on-Thames	King George's Field	Groveley Recreation Ground	TQ 096 710		1947	
Virginia Water	King George's Field		SU 993 672		1960	
West Ewell	King George's Field	Pool Road Recreation Ground	TQ 208 636		1947	
