= Siegfried Rapp =

German pianist

- Born: 1917; Chemnitz, German Empire
- Died: 1977 (aged 59–60); Karl-Marx-Stadt, East Germany
- Education: Leipzig conservatory
- Occupation: Classical pianist

Siegfried Rapp (1917 – 1977) was a German pianist who lost his right arm during World War II and then focused on the left-hand repertoire. He is now mainly remembered for being the first to perform Prokofiev's Piano Concerto No. 4 for the Left Hand, Op. 53.

== Life ==
Rapp was born in Chemnitz in 1917. He studied piano at the Leipzig conservatory with Robert Teichmüller. During World War II he served on the Russian front, where he lost his right arm to shrapnel. Afterwards he resumed his piano studies, specializing in playing with one hand.

Rapp was a popular pianist in East Germany in the 1950s. He often performed Benjamin Britten's Diversions for Piano Left Hand and Orchestra to general acclaim; in fact, a recording of one of his performances was made without his knowledge and sold by a radio station.

Around 1950, Rapp sought permission from Paul Wittgenstein, the left-handed dedicatee of Prokofiev's 4th Piano Concerto (for the left hand), to perform the work himself. Prokofiev had written the concerto in 1931 for Wittgenstein, who had the exclusive right to play it during his lifetime, but 19 years on, it still lay unperformed because the pianist could not come to terms with its inner logic. Wittgenstein refused Rapp's request to premiere the piece in no uncertain terms, writing to him in June 1950:

You don't build a house just so that someone else can live in it. I commissioned and paid for the works, the whole idea was mine ... But those works to which I still have the exclusive performance rights are to remain mine as long as I still perform in public; that's only right and fair. Once I am dead or no longer give concerts, then the works will be available to everyone because I have no wish for them to gather dust in libraries to the detriment of the composer.

However, Wittgenstein must have relented, as Rapp did premiere the concerto on 5 September 1956 in Berlin, with the Berlin Radio Symphony Orchestra conducted by Martin Rich. Reaction to the performance was lukewarm, leading Rapp to say, "Right after the war, with so many disabled veterans around, I found genuine sympathy among audiences. Today it has become much more difficult for me. Today's audiences are spoiled by technical perfection, and they look for force of expression in addition. The two together are hard enough for a man with two arms". Rapp later recorded the work with the Loh-Orchester Sondershausen under Gerhart Wiesenhutter.

Rapp was one of the first to play Sergei Bortkiewicz's Piano Concerto No. 2 for the Left Hand, Op. 28. It had been premiered in 1923 by Wittgenstein but had quickly fallen into oblivion. In 1952, the year of Bortkiewicz's death, Rapp obtained a copy of the score and played it that year in Reichenhall, and in Dresden in 1953 with the Staatskapelle Dresden conducted by Kurt Striegler.

He died in 1977, aged about 60.

== Recordings ==
- His 1964 recording of Lucijan Marija Škerjanc's Piano Concerto for the Left Hand (1963) with the Berlin Radio Symphony Orchestra under Lothar Seyfarth is available on Video on YouTube.
- He recorded Ravel's Concerto for the Left Hand with the Gewandhausorchester conducted by Kurt Masur.
- He recorded Britten's Diversions, Op 21, with the Berlin Radio Symphony Orchestra under Franz Konwitschny and again under Artur Rother.
