= Percy Turnbull =

English composer and pianist

Percy Turnbull (14 July 1902 – 9 December 1976) was an English composer and pianist best known for his piano character pieces and songs.

== Early life ==
Percy Purvis Turnbull trained as a chorister at the Cathedral Church of St Nicholas in Newcastle and took piano lessons from Sigmund Oppenheimer. After leaving school in 1916 he began working for the Tyne Improvement Commission, but kept up his musical interests in his spare time, encouraged by one of the leading musicians of the area, William Gillies Whittaker, founder and conductor of the Newcastle Bach Choir. He won a scholarship to attend the Royal College of Music in 1923 and studied there with Gustav Holst, Ralph Vaughan Williams and John Ireland. While there he won the Mendelssohn Scholarship and Arthur Sullivan Prize for his composition. He also began to give piano recitals and worked as an accompanist for 2LO and early BBC radio.

== Career ==
After college, Turnbull took on a variety of musically-related jobs, editing piano rolls at the Aeolian Company (where his boss was Percy Scholes), playing for the Empire Theatre in Swansea and working as a music copyist for Hubert Foss at the Oxford University Press, as well as teaching piano. In 1941 he began serving in the Royal Artillery, manning anti-aircraft batteries on the East Yorkshire coast.

After the war Turnbull became principal piano teacher at the Surrey College of Music in Ewell, the most settled period of his career, which lasted until the College closed in 1956. From then until the end of his life Turnbull lived with his second wife Mary Parnell in Broomers Hill, Pulborough, Sussex, close enough for frequent visits to see his friend John Ireland, living ten miles away in his windmill near Steyning. He stopped composing in 1960 and took up watercolours.

== Music ==
As a composer, Turnbull was influenced by the standard classical repertoire (Mozart, Beethoven, Brahms) he learned as a pianist and taught to his pupils. This was tempered by an enthusiasm for the Russian pianist composers Scriabin, Rachmaninov and Medtner, as well as the Francophile influence of Fauré and Ravel, and also something of his friend and teacher John Ireland.

Starting at the Royal College of Music, he began composing in all forms. A string quartet won first prize in the Newcastle Music Tournament and was performed there on 8 February 1923. An orchestral Northumbrian Rhapsody for orchestra was first performed by the London Symphony Orchestra at a Patrons' Fund Concert conducted by Sir Adrian Boult in 1925, and the piece was broadcast from London about a year later. His most extended instrumental work, the Violin Sonata, also dates from 1925 when it was played by Marie Wilson with Turnbull as pianist at the Royal College of Music.

After that he composed mostly piano music and songs with piano accompaniment. Few were published in his lifetime, but there are eleven volumes of piano music posthumously published by the Turnbull Memorial Trust, including Seven Character Sketches (1923–1927), a five movement Piano Suite (1925), Six Preludes (1934–41), the Sonatina (1948), Three Winter Pieces (1951) and the Pasticcio on a theme of Mozart (1957) – the latter applying the styles of Bach, Beethoven, Schubert, Chopin, Schumann, Brahms, Fauré, Ravel, Delius and Bartok to the original Mozart theme. There are also two volumes of songs and partsongs. Peter Jacobs performed a selection of the piano music on a SOMM CD released in 2000, and a CD of the songs and partsongs followed in 2001.
