= Fitznells Manor =

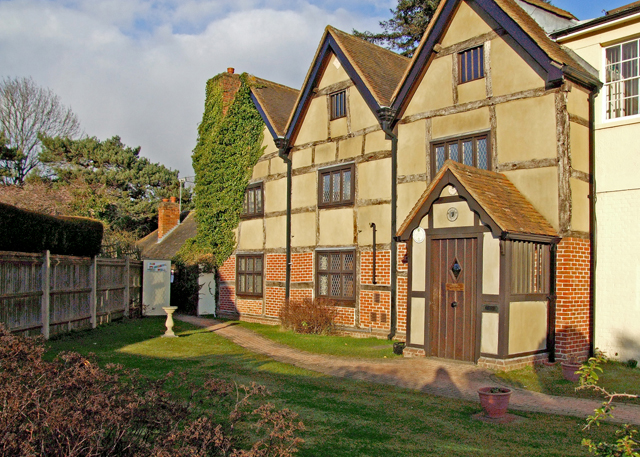

- Location within Surrey
- 51°21′09″N 0°15′13″W
- Type: Manor house
- Location: Chessington Road, Ewell

History
- Built: 16th century
- Built for: Sir John Iwardeby

Site notes
- Area: Surrey

Listed Building – Grade II
- Official name: Fitznells Manor
- Designated: 4 October 1954
- Reference no.: 1214540

Fitznells Manor is the last surviving manor house in the borough of Epsom and Ewell in Surrey, England. It is a Grade II listed building.

== Development ==
The property is named after Sir Robert Fitz-Neil whose family held the estate until 1386, but the oldest part of the current building dates back to the house probably built by Sir John Iwardeby in the early 16th century. He built a traditional timber-framed hall house and it is the solar wing of this house that survives.

Iwardeby's original house was probably similar to the “Bayleaf” farmhouse at the Weald and Downland Open Air Museum.

In the early 17th century with the rest of the original house either demolished or otherwise destroyed the remaining solar wing was extended to the west by the addition of a structure with the three distinctive gables.

In the late 18th century a large single-storey kitchen area was added to the north elevation including the large chimney. During the 19th century further single-storey extensions were added to the north and a large two-storey extension to the south with a verandah.

== 20th century ==
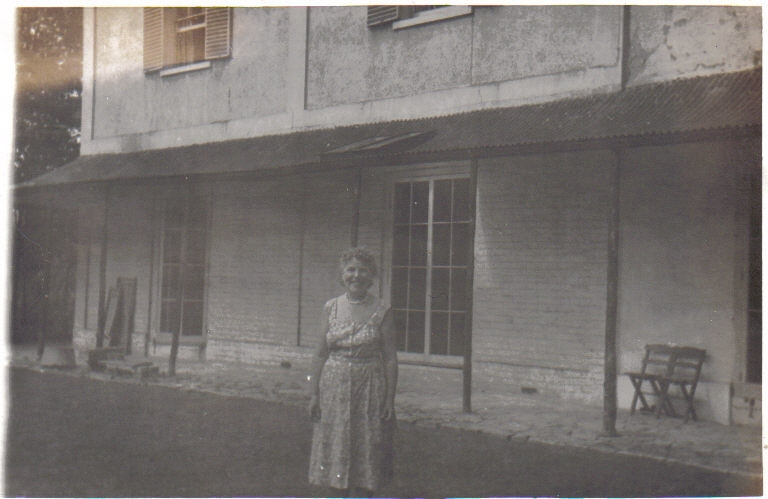
Rear elevation in the mid-1960s showing the iron verandah

Fitznells continued to function as a farmhouse well into the 20th century; when bought by S. E. Parkes (Modern Homes & Estates) in 1927 from the Gadesden family the estate still included 125 acres (0.51 km^{2}) of land, farm buildings and five cottages.

In 1930 William Batho purchased the house and its immediate grounds. During the Second World War the house was requisitioned for use as a clothing exchange.

The Surrey College of Music (also known as the Southern Music Training Centre) occupied the house after the war but this closed in 1956 when the lease was terminated. In 1959 the house was bought by Anthony Carter and Vivienne Price, who ran the Fitznells School of Music on the ground floor while living in the floor above. In 1988 the house was bought by Conifercourt Holdings Ltd for use as their head office. The renovation works they undertook transformed the building to its current appearance.

The house is currently used as a doctor's surgery.

== Restoration ==
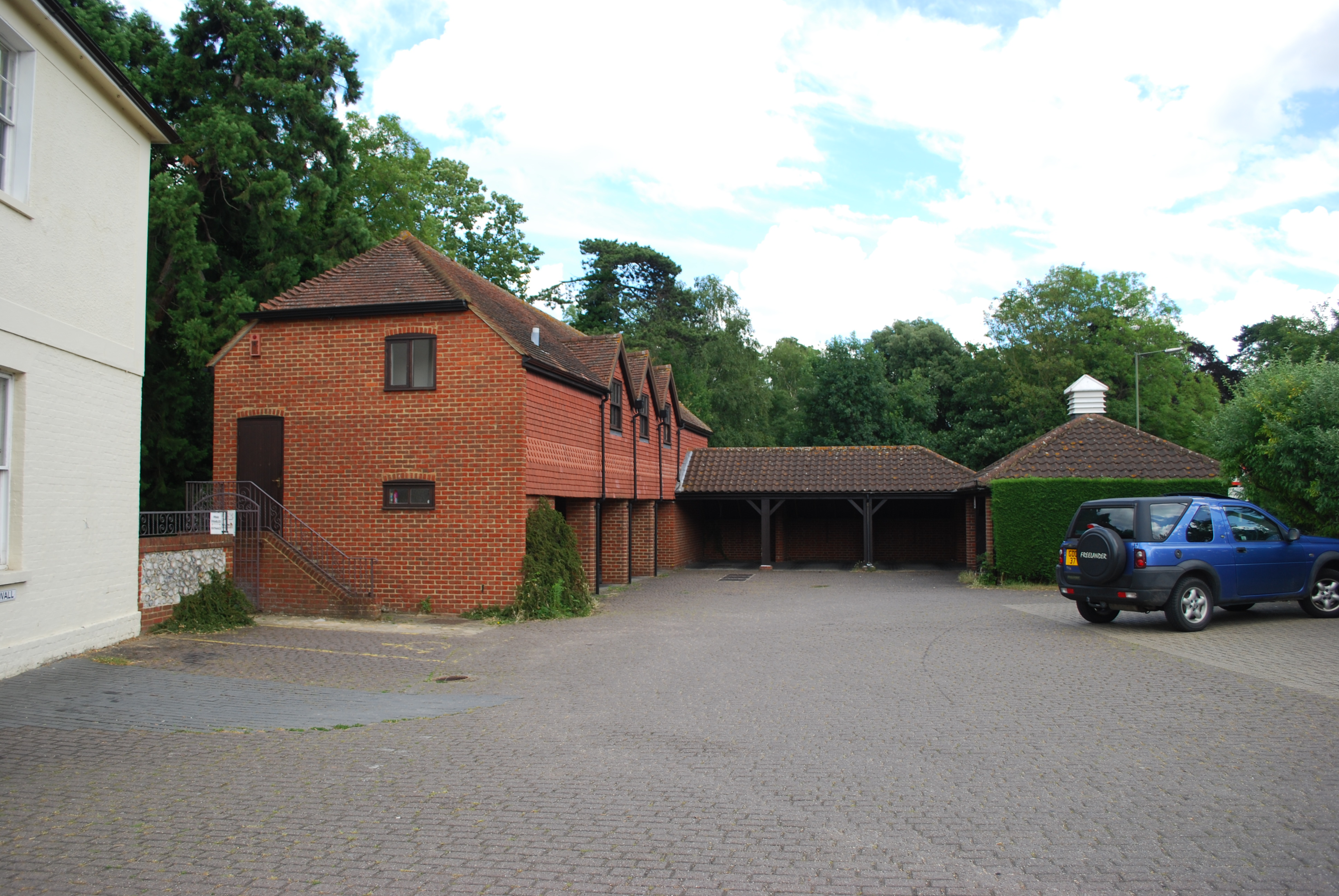
Buildings added in 1988 (July 2009)

Renovation works were carried out in 1988 including:

- Removal of the render concealing the timber frame of the 17th-century front to the house
- Replacement of the Victorian entrance porch
- Re-opening of the solar that had been sub-divided since the early 17th century
- Erection of a reproduction Victorian-style verandah to the rear elevation
- Replacement of a later sash window in the solar with an original-sized window

Additional buildings to the south of the main house were added on the site at this time.
