= Chinnor Hill =

Hill in Oxfordshire, England

Coordinates: 51.699°N 0.893°W

- Site of Special Scientific Interest
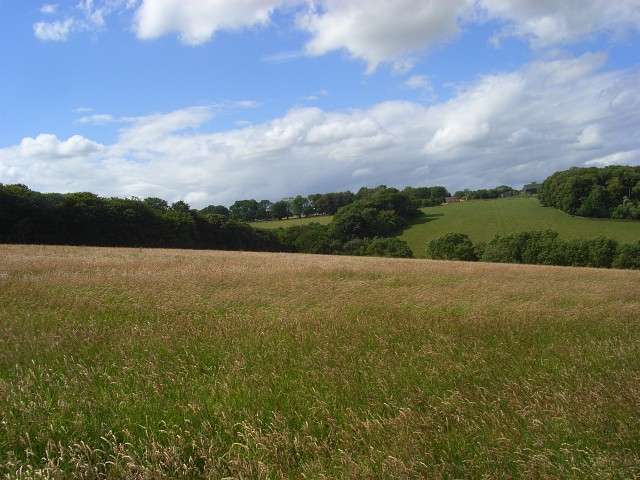
- Location of Chinnor Hill.
- Area of search: Oxfordshire
- Grid reference: SP 766 006
- Interest: Biological
- Area: 26.8 hectares (66 acres)
- Notification date: 1986
- Location map: Magic Map

Chinnor Hill is a 26.8-hectare (66-acre) biological Site of Special Scientific Interest east of Chinnor in Oxfordshire. It is managed by the Berkshire, Buckinghamshire and Oxfordshire Wildlife Trust.

This hill has species-rich calcareous grassland, juniper scrub, which is an uncommon habitat, mixed scrub and woodland. More than 300 species of vascular plant have been recorded and 65 of birds. Many passerines breed in the scrub, and thrushes such as redwings and fieldfares feed on berries in the winter.
