= Ewell =

Town in Surrey, England

Coordinates: 51.350°N 0.249°W

- Town
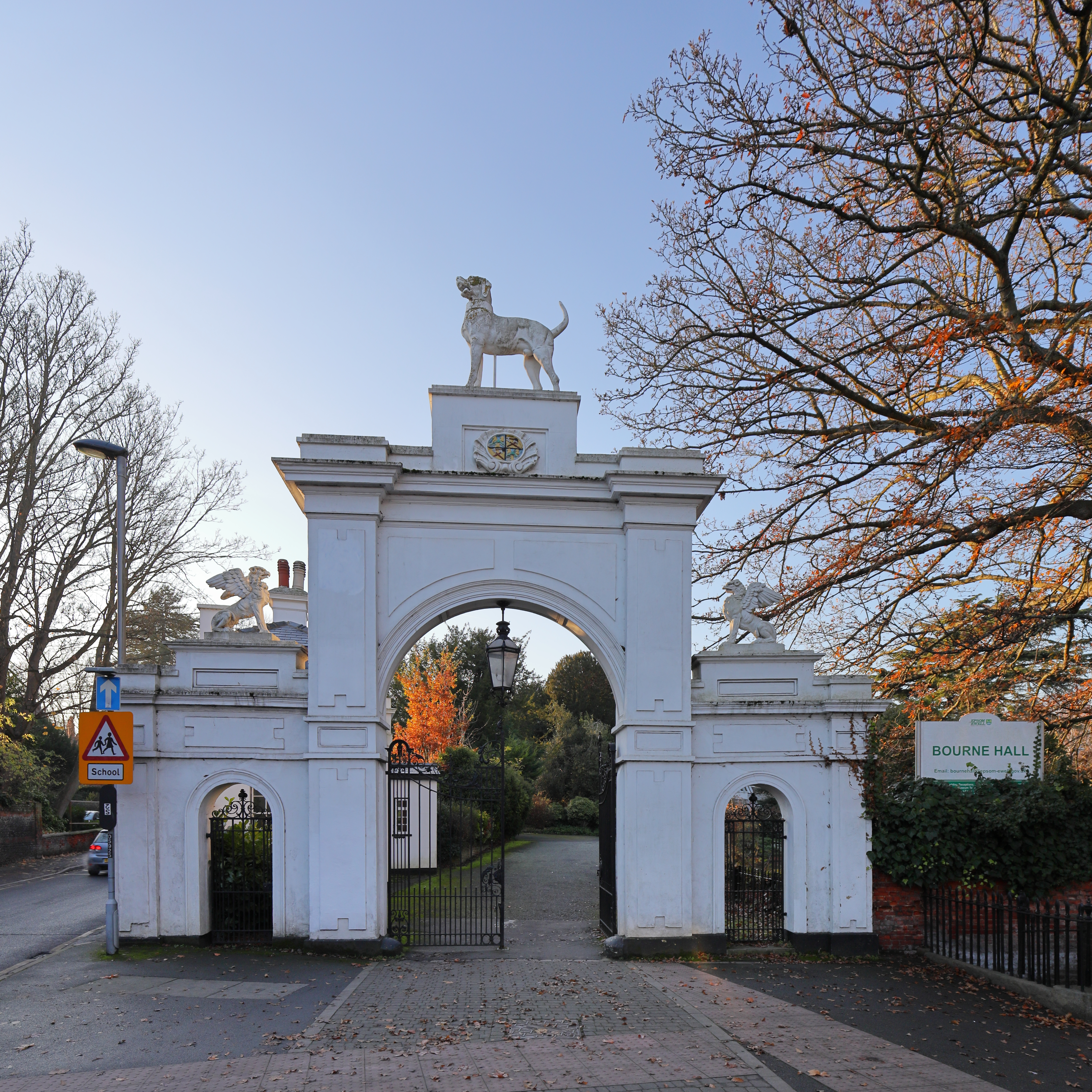
- Dog Gate to Bourne Hall gardens, Ewell

- Saint Mary the Virgin, parish church

- Location within Surrey
- Area: 14.09 km^{2} (5.44 sq mi)
- Population: 34,872 (2011 census)
  - Density: 2,475/km^{2} (6,410/sq mi)
- OS grid reference: TQ2263
  - London: 12.1 mi (19.5 km)
- District: Epsom and Ewell
- Shire county: Surrey
- Region: South East
- Country: England
- Sovereign state: United Kingdom
- Post town: EPSOM
- Postcode district: KT17 KT19
- Dialling code: 020
- Police: Surrey
- Fire: Surrey
- Ambulance: South East Coast
- UK Parliament: Epsom and Ewell

Ewell (/ˈjuːəl/ YOO-əl, inf. /ˈjuːl/ YOOL) is a town in the Epsom and Ewell district, in Surrey, England, 12 miles (19 kilometres) south of central London and two miles (three kilometres) northeast of Epsom. At the 2011 census, it had a population of 34,872. The majority (73%) was in the ABC1 social class, except the Ruxley Ward that is C2DE.

Ewell was founded as a spring line settlement, where the permeable chalk of the North Downs meets the impermeable London Clay, and the Hogsmill River (a tributary of the River Thames) still rises at a spring close to Bourne Hall in the village centre. Recorded in Domesday Book as Etwelle, the settlement was granted a market charter to hold a market in 1618. The town is contiguous with the Greater London suburbs.

== History ==
The name Ewell derives from Old English æwell, which means river source or spring. The second half of the name of the village of Temple Ewell in Kent has the same meaning.

Bronze Age remains have been found in Ewell and the Romans are likely to have encountered an existing religious site when they first arrived leaving pottery, bones, and a few other remains, which have been taken to the British Museum. Ewell is on a long line of spring line settlements founded along the foot of hills on a geological line between the chalk of the North Downs to the south, and the clay of the London Basin to the north.

The Roman road Stane Street from Chichester deviates from straight slightly at Ewell to pass by the central spring. Its successor, the A24 (London Road) runs from Merton to Ewell along the course of the Roman road, and leaves Ewell also with a by-pass connecting it to Epsom. (Note: It continues as since Roman times to Leatherhead and Dorking however terminates at the more modern resort of Worthing, five miles (eight kilometres) east of the small port and cathedral city of Chichester on the coast.)

Ewell was traditionally located within the Copthorne hundred.

Ewell appears in Domesday Book of 1086 as Etwelle. It was held by William the Conqueror. Its assets were: 13½ hides; 2 mills worth 10s, 16 ploughs, 14 acres (6 hectares) of meadow, woodland and herbage worth 111 hogs. It rendered £25 per year to its feudal system overlords; also £1 from the church in Leatherhead, it was held by Osbert de Ow and was attached to his manor. In the 13th century Ewell's current spelling appears, in the Testa de Nevill.

King Henry VIII established here in 1538 Nonsuch Palace on the borders of Cheam, considered one of his greatest building projects. The estate, now Nonsuch Park, a public park, was one of his favourite hunting grounds, although no trace of the palace remains, having been destroyed during the 17th century. In the same park, is Nonsuch Mansion a Grade II* listed 18th-century house occasionally open to visitors.

In 1618 Henry Lloyd, lord of the manor, was granted licence to hold a market in Ewell. The market died away in the early 19th century.

Samuel Pepys visited Ewell on numerous occasions in the 17th century and the area is mentioned several times between 1663 and 1665 in his diary, in which he spells it Yowell.

The enclosure (privatisation) of its common fields of 707 acres (286 hectares) in the east and its infertile land ('waste') of 495 acres (200 hectares) was carried out in 1801. In 1811 a National School was established sponsored by Mr. White and Mr. Brumfield. Thomas Calverley built the large architecturally listed home Ewell Castle in 1814 in an imitation castellated style and gave the school financial benefaction, which became available in 1860. In 1879 Ewell Court House, latterly a library was built with a grotto that survives.

Ewell was largely developed with semi detached housing in the 1930s, with a minority of the Ewell area built on after World War II. In the 1980s, an elderly lifelong resident of Ewell, named Digeance, recalled the pasture land and orchards that stretched north and west right across to Berrylands in the Royal Borough of Kingston upon Thames. This radical transformation is documented in the photography collected in the book Archive Photos – Epsom and Ewell. The suburban residential development across that area is mainly 1930s/40s semi-detached houses, although some Edwardian, Victorian and earlier architecture is still present. The Hogsmill Open Space gives an indication of Ewell's rural prewar history.

== Government and politics ==
There are two tiers of local government covering Ewell, at district and county level: Epsom and Ewell Borough Council, based in Epsom, and Surrey County Council, based in Reigate.

Ewell was an ancient parish. When elected parish and district councils were established in 1894 it was given a parish council and included in the Epsom Rural District. In 1933 the parish was absorbed into the neighbouring urban district of Epsom, at which point the parish council was disbanded, with the parish thereafter being an urban parish with no council of its own. The following year the urban district was renamed "Epsom and Ewell" in recognition of Ewell's inclusion. The urban district was made a municipal borough in 1937. In 1951 the parish had a population of 25,762. On 1 April 1974 the parish was abolished.

The town lies entirely within the parliamentary constituency of Epsom and Ewell, and is currently represented in parliament by Liberal Democrat Helen Maguire.

== Landmarks ==
=== Bourne Hall ===
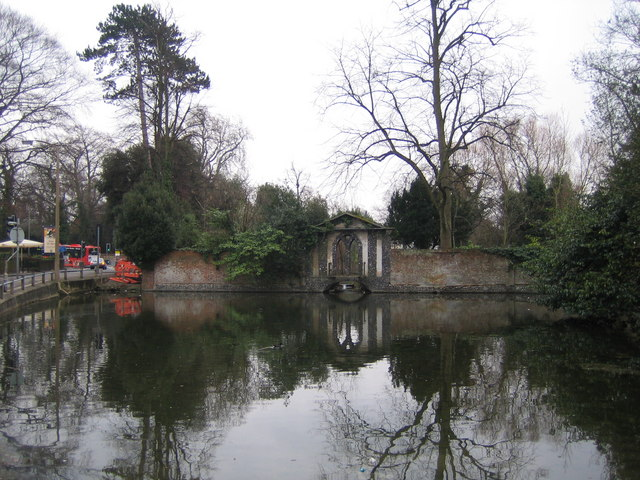
The pond, Bourne Hall grounds

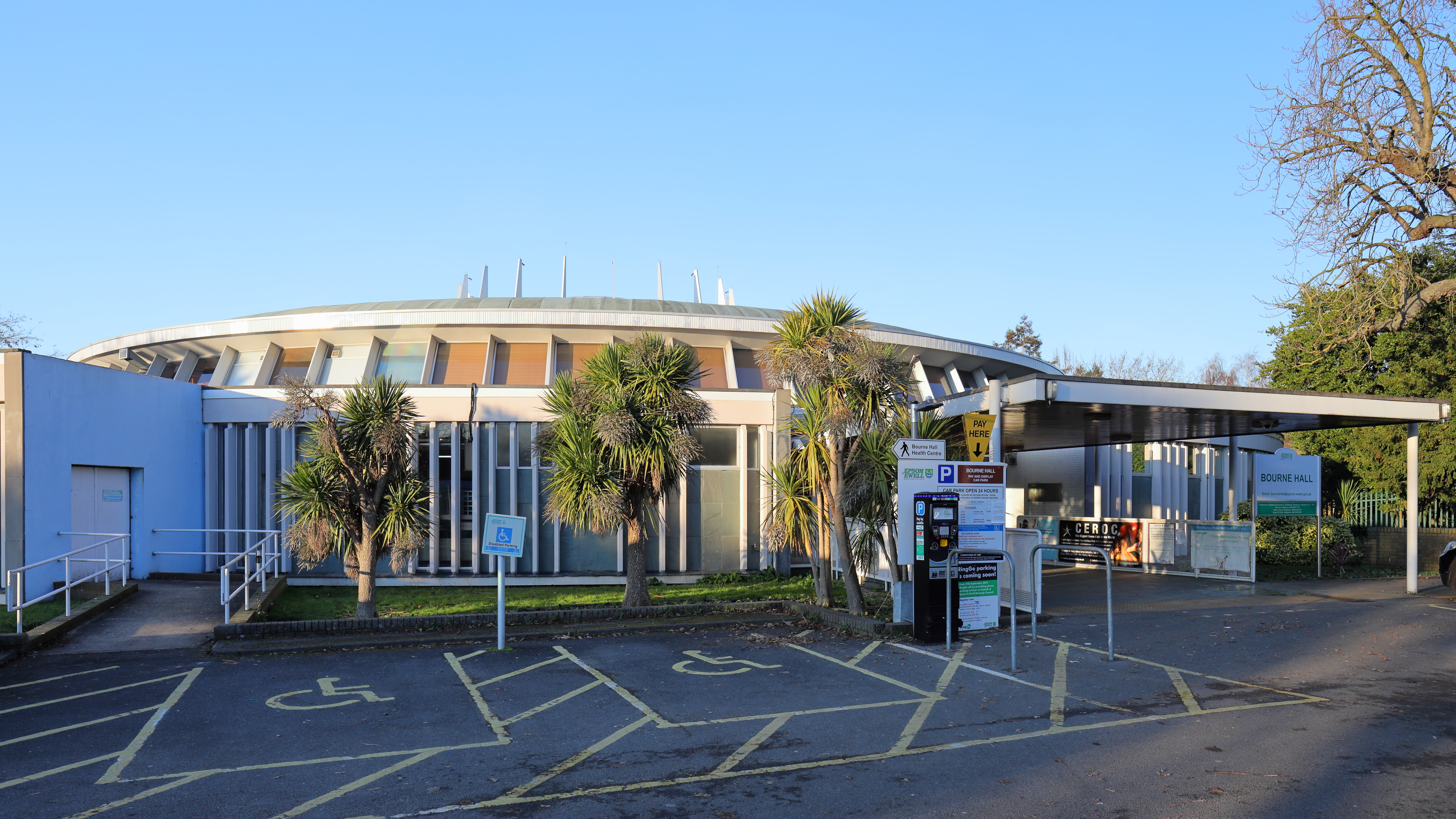
Bourne Hall

Ewell's largest landmark is Bourne Hall in the centre of the town. It is a modernist circular structure with a central glass dome, built in 1967–70 to a design by A. G. Sheppard Fidler and Associates. The building houses a public library, subterranean theatre, gymnasium, café and local museum, and holds gatherings such as fairs, yoga and karate lessons. It was Grade II listed by English Heritage in 2015 for reasons of architectural interest and also for historic interest as "an ambitious example of the expansion of the library service and the integration of community facilities and disabled access".

Bourne Hall is surrounded by a stream-side public park with a pond at one end and a fountain; these were formerly the grounds of Garbrand Hall, an 18th-century mansion, later used as a school and also called Bourne Hall, which the new building replaced. The garden wall, a 19th-century entrance arch to the gardens, the nearby lodge, and an 18th-century bridge inside the gateway were Grade II listed in 1954 and a waterwheel in 1976.

=== St Mary's Church ===
Ewell has a C of E Parish Church (Saint Mary the Virgin, Ewell), which was designed by Henry Clutton and consecrated in 1848. The current building stands in a prominent position near the centre of the town on old London Road. A replacement for an earlier church building on the site, it was built in a form of the Decorated Neo-Gothic style and faced with Swanage stone with Bath Stone mullions and tracery. The church is home to the 1889 'Father' Henry Willis pipe organ. The ruins of the old church's early medieval tower stand alone in parkland and are a Scheduled Ancient Monument.

=== Other landmarks ===
St Paul's Howell Hill is situated in East Ewell and is known locally due to its prominent presence on a roundabout and its contemporary design.

Unlike most parts of its borough, Ewell has telephone numbers using the London 020 area code, alongside Stoneleigh. (Note: Anomaly shared with East Molesey and Thames Ditton in Surrey, Chigwell and Loughton in Essex) Ewell also has an unusually large telephone exchange, beside The Spring pub, fitted with underground facilities designed to survive a nuclear conflict during the later years of the Cold War. It was transferred in 2000 from the Metropolitan Police, in whose district it had been placed since 1839, to the jurisdiction of Surrey Police.

== Economy ==
Ewell's town centre is the 400 m (1,300 ft) long High Street which contains two chain convenience stores, Sainsbury's Local and Co-op, in addition to a post office. There are no longer any banks in Ewell. The Green Man and the Ewell Tap public houses are located on the High Street, with three other pubs: the Eight Bells, the Wheatsheaf and the Spring located nearby on Kingston Road in the north of the town.

== Neighbourhoods ==
=== Ewell Town ===
The central, historic centre of Ewell containing the High Street, St Mary's, Bourne Hall, Ewell Castle School and immediate surrounding areas.

=== Ewell Court ===
Ewell Court is a residential area and ward to the northwest of Ewell Village. In the centre of the area is Ewell Court Park, which contains Ewell Court House and Ewell Court Lake. The volunteer-run Ewell Court Library is inside Ewell Court House. A large portion of the Hogsmill Open Space, a local nature reserve, is in this area, from the railway line near Ewell Village to Ruxley Lane. This contains several tributaries of the Hogsmill River, including the confluence with the Horton Stream near Ruxley Lane. Ewell Court is bounded to the northeast by the A240 (Kingston Road).

=== West Ewell ===
West Ewell is a large residential area with several local centres. Its main centre is the area around Ewell West railway station, which contains a parade of shops. Its principal roads are Chessington Road and Ruxley Lane. These are both B-roads which contain several parades of shops. A section of the Hogsmill Open Space, including the Bonesgate Stream is in the northern fringes of the area. Ruxley Farm Bridge is in the centre of Ruxley Lane over the Hogsmill River, replacing a ford, Ruxley Splash. West Ewell is served by buses travelling between Epsom and Kingston, as well as Chessington.

West Ewell covers two wards: West Ewell Ward, to the south of Ruxley Lane and Ruxley Ward, to the north.

=== East Ewell ===
This is an area of predominantly semi-detached housing dating from the 1930s. This area, to the east of the A24 Ewell Bypass is served by Ewell East railway station. The A232 runs through it, east-west.

A large part of Nonsuch Park, including the old Nonsuch Palace, can be found in East Ewell as can the remains of the derelict Cuddington Church. Warren Farm Local Nature Reserve is here, and Ewell East station serves Howell Hill mostly in East Ewell which also refers to the small nature reserve on its south edge.

=== Ewell Downs ===
An area of detached housing with several private roads. Located in the south of Ewell, between the centre and Epsom Downs

== Education ==
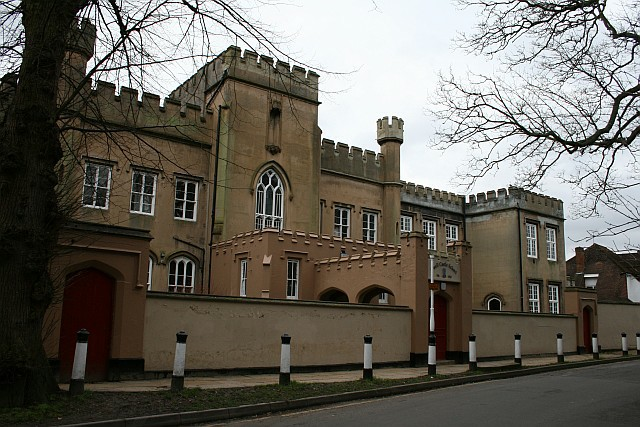
Ewell Castle School, Church Street

Closest to the town are at senior (secondary) level:

- private day school Ewell Castle School, on Church Street, Ewell Village
- boys (Mixed in Sixth Form) Academy Glyn School, on The Kingsway, just west of Ewell Village
- mixed comprehensive school Blenheim High School, Longmead Road, between West Ewell and Epsom.
- mixed comprehensive school Epsom and Ewell High School on Ruxley Lane, West Ewell

At further education level:

- North East Surrey College of Technology, East Ewell.

For the wider list of all schools in the borough, see borough of Epsom and Ewell.

== Parks and open spaces ==
=== Nonsuch Park ===
A historic park to the east of Ewell Village, extending into Stoneleigh and Cheam. Former site of 16th Century Nonsuch Palace, current site of Nonsuch Mansion.

=== Warren Farm ===
A local nature reserve in East Ewell owned by the Woodland Trust. Located adjacent to Nonsuch Park and Nonsuch High School.

=== Hogsmill Open Space ===
An extensive wildlife corridor, stretching from the Hogsmill source in Ewell Village and extending downstream along the course of the river. This stretches north-west through Ewell Court and West Ewell, extending out to Kingston. Contains three enclosed parks, including Bourne Hall (detailed above in the Landmarks section) and:

==== Ewell Court Park ====
An enclosed area incorporating Ewell Court lake and Ewell Court House (with a cafe) . The house was restored after the 2014 fire. The Ewell Court stream flows into the main Hogsmill River on the edge of the park. The Hogmsill acts as a natural park boundary, with fences containing pedestrian gates around the rest of the perimeter.

==== Poole Road Recreation Ground ====
An area of green space containing a playground and two grass football pitches.

The Harrier Centre can be found there, containing Ewell Athletics Track, home to Epsom and Ewell Harriers Athletics club. Found in 1890 (the oldest in Surrey), the club have trained at this track since the 1950s. Gauntlett Boxing Club have trained at the Harrier Centre since 2017.

=== Priest Hill Local Nature Reserve ===
Located in East Ewell, near to the A240.

=== London Road Recreation Ground ===
A small park on the northern edge of Ewell Village, containing a large playground and 2.3 hectares of open space

=== Gibraltar Recreation Ground ===
A park just west of Ewell Village, next to Ewell West railway station. Contains a bowling green, tennis courts, football pitches and a large playground.

== Sports, recreation and leisure ==
In Ewell Court, there is a King George's Field in memorial to King George V. Also at the King George's Field, there is Ewell Athletics Track, a UK Athletics Class B track where Epsom and Ewell Harriers, founded in 1890, have trained since the 1950s. The Harrier Centre, a small sports centre also containing a children's soft play area, was built as an addition to the athletics track in 2000. Ewell Tennis Club is on the western edge of Ewell Village.

Ewell is also home to Ewell St Mary's Morris Men. Founded in 1979, further to a bequest from the then Vicar, Peter Hogben, for the annual Village Fete – the Team danced into The Morris Ring in the late 1980s and now have many dances in their repertoire. They dance Cotswold Morris and sport black top hats, red and white baldrics and ribbons.

Ewell is on the London Outer Orbital Path (London Loop) walking route. The path heads through South Cheam into Warren Farm and Nonsuch Park via East Ewell, before crossing into Ewell Village passing Ewell Castle School. It passes through Bourne Hall (at the main source of the Hogsmill River) before heading along the Hogsmill Open Space past the Kingston borough border.

== Transport ==
Ewell is served by two railway stations: Ewell West, which has services towards London Waterloo, Dorking and Guildford, and Ewell East, which has services towards London Victoria, London Bridge, Dorking and Horsham. Both stations are in London fare zone 6.

Bus services in Ewell include the TfL-operated 293, 406, 418, 467, S2 and non-TfL operated E5 and E16 providing links to Morden, Kingston Upon Thames and Chessington.

== Demography and housing ==
2011 Census Homes
Ward	Detached	Semi-detached	Terraced	Flats and apartments	Caravans/temporary/mobile homes/houseboats	Shared between households
Cuddington	627	782	435	520	0	2
Ewell	799	482	402	756	0	0
Ewell Court	666	1,200	127	225	2	0
Nonsuch	1,733	114	22	60	0	0
Ruxley	342	690	501	980	12	0
West Ewell	272	1,257	562	307	1	0

2011 Census Households
Ward	Population	Households	% Owned outright	% Owned with a loan	hectares
Cuddington	5,934	2,366	39	43	135
Ewell	5,532	2,439	38	37	155
Ewell Court	5,417	2,220	49	40	146
Nonsuch	5,438	1,929	52	44	610
Ruxley	6,174	2,525	29	43	240
West Ewell	6,377	2,399	35	46	123

== In art ==
Pre-Raphaelite artist William Holman Hunt married and produced several works here. The doorway linking St Mary's church yard and the grounds of Glyn House are reproduced as the door on which Christ is knocking his painting The Light of the World.

The background for John Everett Millais' oil on canvas Ophelia was painted at the Hogsmill River in Ewell.

== In the media ==
In August 2005 the borough of Epsom and Ewell was rated the most desirable place to live in the United Kingdom by the British television programme The Best and Worst Place to Live in the UK; the following year's edition figured it in 8th place. The borough's low crime rate, good education results and large number of open spaces were all cited as its particularly attractive features, although being less commercial than the centres of Kingston or London, having a relative 'lack of entertainment facilities'.

== Notable people ==
Singer Petula Clark was born in Ewell in 1932, as well as the broadcaster James Whale, and TV presenter Michaela Strachan. Playwright John Osborne lived in Ewell as a boy. Michael Frayn, author and playwright, lived as a child in Hillside Road, off Queensmead Avenue, East Ewell.

In sport, footballer Ron Harris (Note: Played for Chelsea Football Club) lived in Ewell during the 1970s, cyclist Sean Yates in childhood, Trevor "Tosh" Chamberlain (Note: Played for Fulham Football Club) lived in the town, as did high jumper Phyllis Nicol. Michael "Venom" Page was a former resident.

== See also ==
- Fitznells Manor
- List of places of worship in Epsom and Ewell

== Notes and references ==
Notes
