= Cheam railway station =

National Rail station in London, England

Cheam
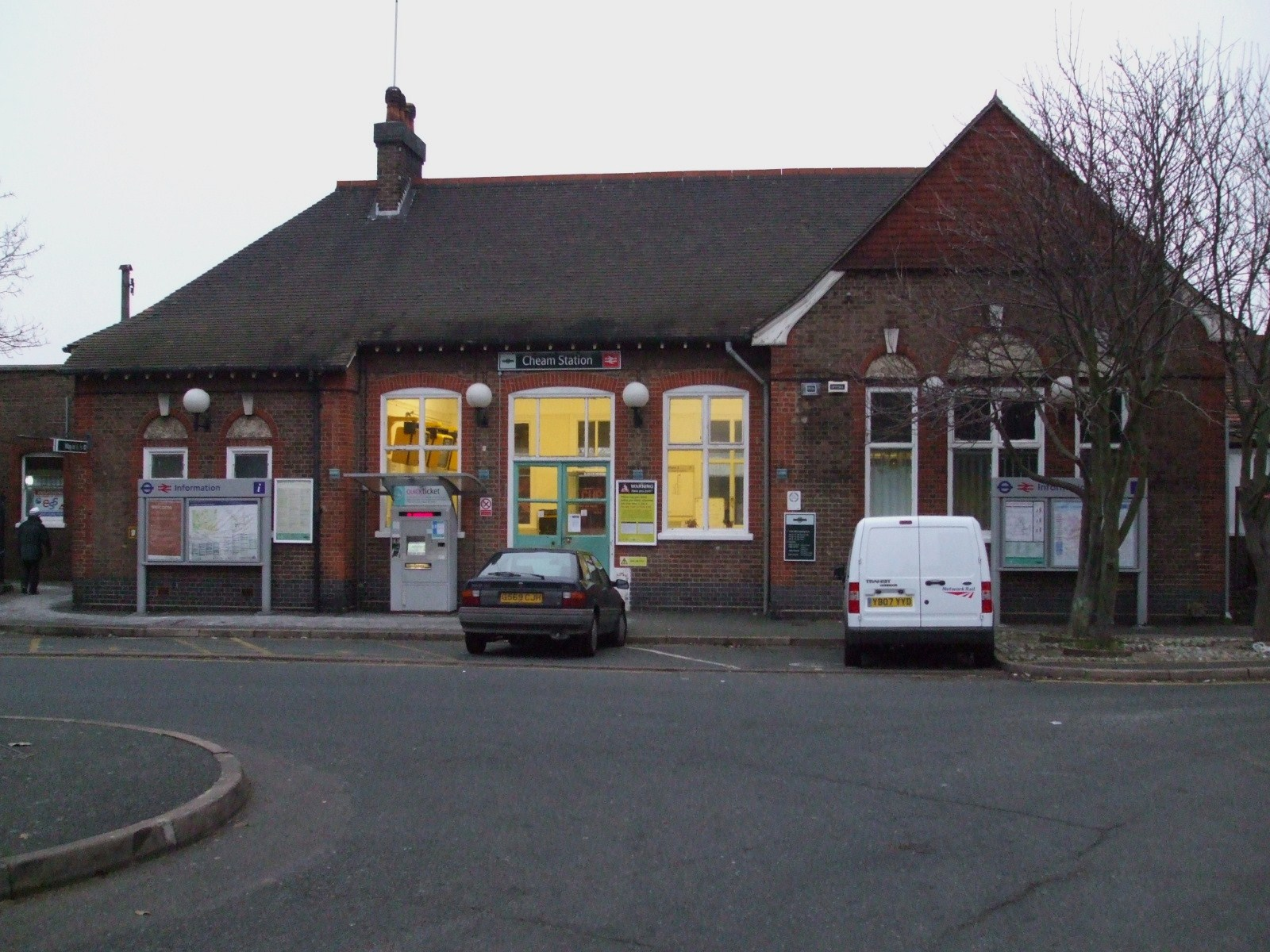
- Main building
- Interactive map of Cheam

General information
- Location: Cheam
- Local authority: London Borough of Sutton
- Managed by: Southern
- Station code: CHE
- DfT category: D
- Number of platforms: 2
- Accessible: Yes
- Fare zone: 5

National Rail annual entry and exit
- 2020–21: ▼0.265 million
- 2021–22: ▲0.665 million
- 2022–23: ▲0.790 million
- 2023–24: ▲0.843 million
- 2024–25: ▲0.933 million

Key dates
- 10 May 1847: Opened

Other information
- External links: Departures; Facilities
- Coordinates: 51.356°N 0.2147°W

Cheam railway station serves Cheam in the London Borough of Sutton. It is located on the Sutton & Mole Valley Lines section from Sutton to Epsom with trains to London Victoria and London Bridge both via Mitcham Junction and West Croydon.

== Location ==
Cheam Railway station is located between Cheam Village and South Cheam. This is approximately 200 meters south of Cheam High Street (A232), near its junction with the A217. The railway goes under the A217 (Belmont Rise) at the eastern end of the station.

== History ==
In 1844, Cheam was on the planned route for the London to Portsmouth atmospheric railway. The section of line between Croydon and Epsom was part of the London & Croydon Railway company who promoted the Clegg and Samuda atmospheric principle, utilizing a 15 in (380 mm) pipe. This project failed, and Cheam station became part of the London, Brighton and South Coast Railway on 10 May 1847.

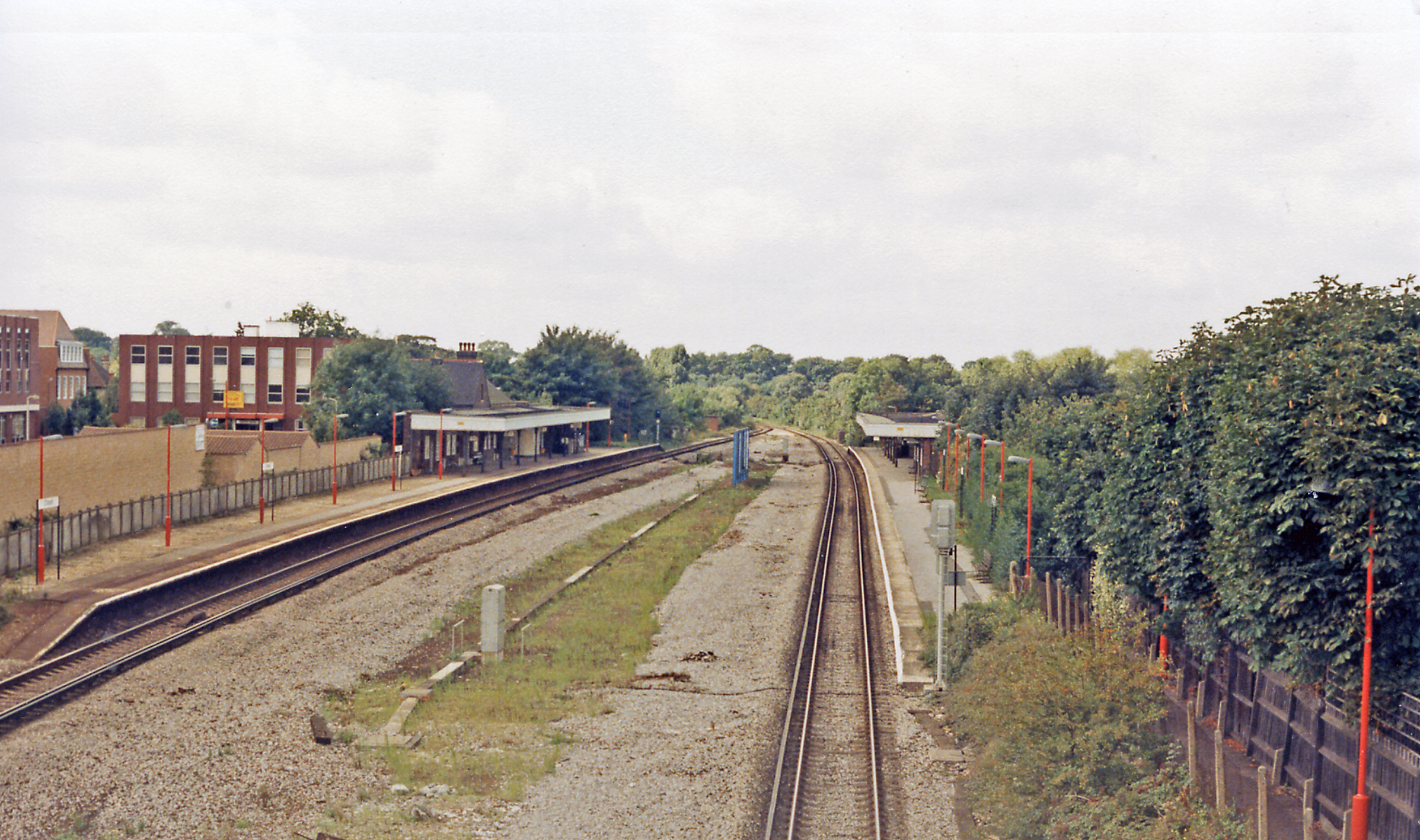
View from the A217 bridge in 1986

The station is almost 16 miles (26 km) from London Bridge station. Over the years, Cheam station expanded, and was rebuilt and the rail bed widened in preparation for the installation of AC overhead electric services, which would have included the building of an additional central platform island. Due to the outbreak of the First World War, the full planned expansion was cancelled and was never completed. Nevertheless, the through lines were still in place until 1978 after the Bognor Regis and Portsmouth express services were withdrawn from the Sutton and Dorking route to serve an expanding Gatwick Airport. The wide space between the tracks still remains and shows where the fast lines had been laid prior their removal. The brick main buildings are on the down side of the station.

== Services ==
All services at Cheam are operated by Southern using Class 377 EMUs.

The typical off-peak service in trains per hour is:

- 2 tph to London Victoria via Hackbridge
- 2 tph to London Bridge via West Croydon
- 2 tph to Epsom
- 2 tph to Dorking of which 1 continues to Horsham

On Saturday evenings (after approximately 18:45) and on Sundays, there is no service south of Dorking to Horsham.

Preceding station	National Rail	Following station
Sutton	Southern Sutton & Mole Valley Lines	Ewell East or Epsom

== Connections ==
London Buses route S2 serves the station.
