= Sue Riddlestone =

Sue Riddlestone is a British sustainability executive and social entrepreneur who is the chief executive and co-founder of Bioregional. She is known for her work on sustainable communities, the development of the One Planet Living framework, and her leadership in the creation of the BedZED eco-village in south London.

Riddlestone has worked on sustainable development policy and practice in the United Kingdom and internationally. She contributed to the sustainability strategy for the 2012 Summer Olympics and 2012 Summer Paralympics. She participated in United Nations efforts that led to the adoption of the Sustainable Development Goals (SDGs), particularly Goal 12 on Sustainable Consumption and Production. She has advised governments, businesses and developers on sustainable housing and communities.

== Career ==
=== Bioregional ===
Riddlestone co-founded Bioregional with her husband, Pooran Desai, in 1994. The organisation was established to develop practical solutions for sustainable living through businesses, products, services and community projects.

Under her leadership, Bioregional initiated the development of the BedZED (Beddington Zero Energy Development) eco-village in south London, which was conceived in 1997 and completed in 2002.

=== One Planet Living ===
In 2003, Riddlestone co-founded the One Planet Living initiative following the experience gained through BedZED. The framework provides principles and guidance for planning, delivering and communicating sustainability across communities, organisations, cities and developments.

One Planet Living has since been applied across five continents and has been used in real estate developments valued at more than 30 billion dollars.

=== Public policy ===
Riddlestone has contributed to environmental policy in the United Kingdom and internationally.

In 2003, she authored All New Homes Should Be Zero Carbon, a paper that informed the UK Government's zero-carbon homes policy adopted in 2006. She later served on the UK Government's Eco-towns Challenge Panel and was lead author of the 2008 report What Makes an Eco-town, published with CABE, which informed eco-town planning policy.

She has also served as a London Sustainable Development Commissioner and as a board member of Catalyst 2030, where she has chaired work on government partnerships and United Nations advocacy.

== Other activities ==
Riddlestone was elected an Ashoka Fellow in 2019.

She has spoken and participated in sustainability initiatives including the launch of the Climate Changemaker Playbook, a collaboration between the Skoll Centre and Ashoka.

== Awards and honours ==
Riddlestone was appointed Officer of the Order of the British Empire (OBE) in 2013 for services to sustainable business and to the London 2012 Olympic and Paralympic Games. Her other honours include:

- Ashoka Fellow (2019)
- Urban Re-Inventor Award from the Academy of Urbanism (2021)
- Global Good Awards – Individual Leader of the Year (Gold) (2019)
- Schwab Foundation Social Entrepreneur of the Year (2011, jointly with Pooran Desai)
- Skoll Award for Social Entrepreneurship
- Ernst & Young Entrepreneur of the Year, London and South East Region (2011)
- Climate Week Award – Most Inspirational Leader (2012, jointly with Pooran Desai)
- Named among Building Design magazine's Top 50 Green Leaders (2012, jointly with Pooran Desai)

== See also ==
- Bioregional
- BedZED
- Sustainable development
- Sustainable Development Goals
