= Therapia Lane Depot =

Tram depot in Croydon, United Kingdom

Coordinates: 51.3871°N 0.1342°W

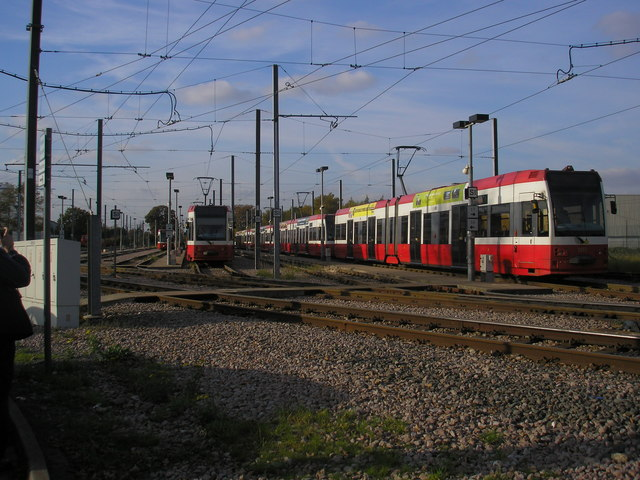
Therapia Lane Tram Depot

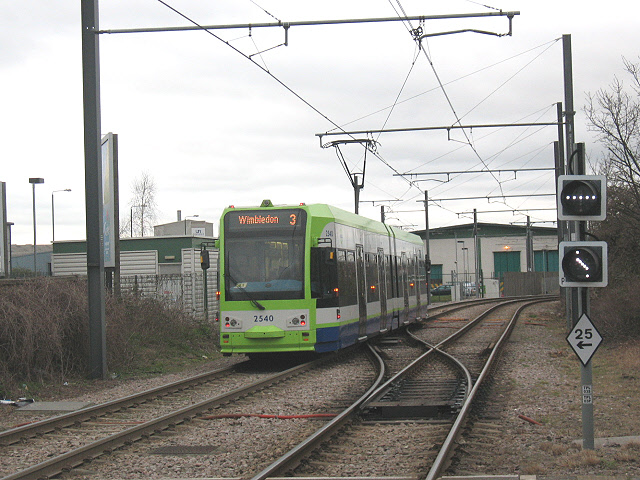
A tram approaching Therapia Lane tram stop, with the depot buildings in the background

Therapia Lane depot is a tram depot, situated in the London Borough of Sutton between Therapia Lane and Beddington Lane. Built on the site of former railway sidings, all tram maintenance, repairs and control functions are based in a purpose-built building, erected in 1998.

The depot has sufficient stabling for up to 24 tram sets, and a double-track workshop with all required facilities to perform almost all maintenance. Additionally, system control room is located within the building, as well as a base for the British Transport Police to monitor the network.

In December 2025, the upgrades were completed on the depot that eliminated the use of fossil fuels in its operations, with the installation of solar panels, electric heaters, and heat pumps to replace gas powered boilers.
