= Epsom Town railway station =

Former railway station in England

Coordinates: 51°20′06″N 0°15′40″W

Epsom Town
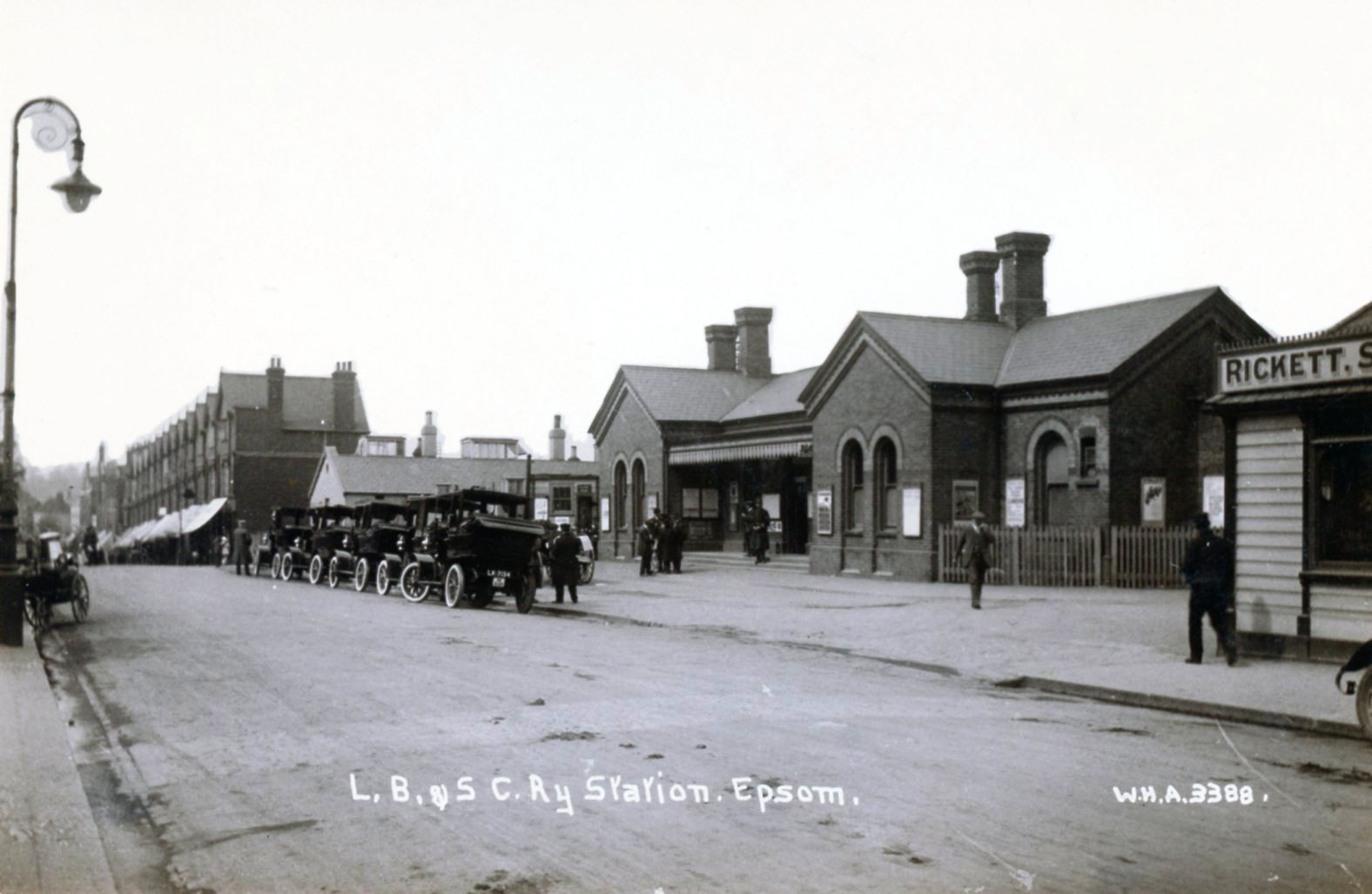
- Epsom Town station in the 1900s (Applebee's postcard).

General information
- Location: Epsom, Borough of Epsom and Ewell; England
- Platforms: 2

Other information
- Status: Disused

Key dates
- 10 May 1847: opened
- 3 March 1929: station closed and replaced by a rebuilt Epsom railway station
Location

Epsom Town railway station is a closed railway station that served the town of Epsom in Surrey, England. For many years, Epsom had two railway stations, one built by the LSWR in 1859, and this station, built by the LBSCR twelve years earlier. It was located on Upper High Street and is less than ten minutes' walk from the town's other station. It closed in 1929 when the former LSWR station was rebuilt and expanded to four platforms.

== History ==
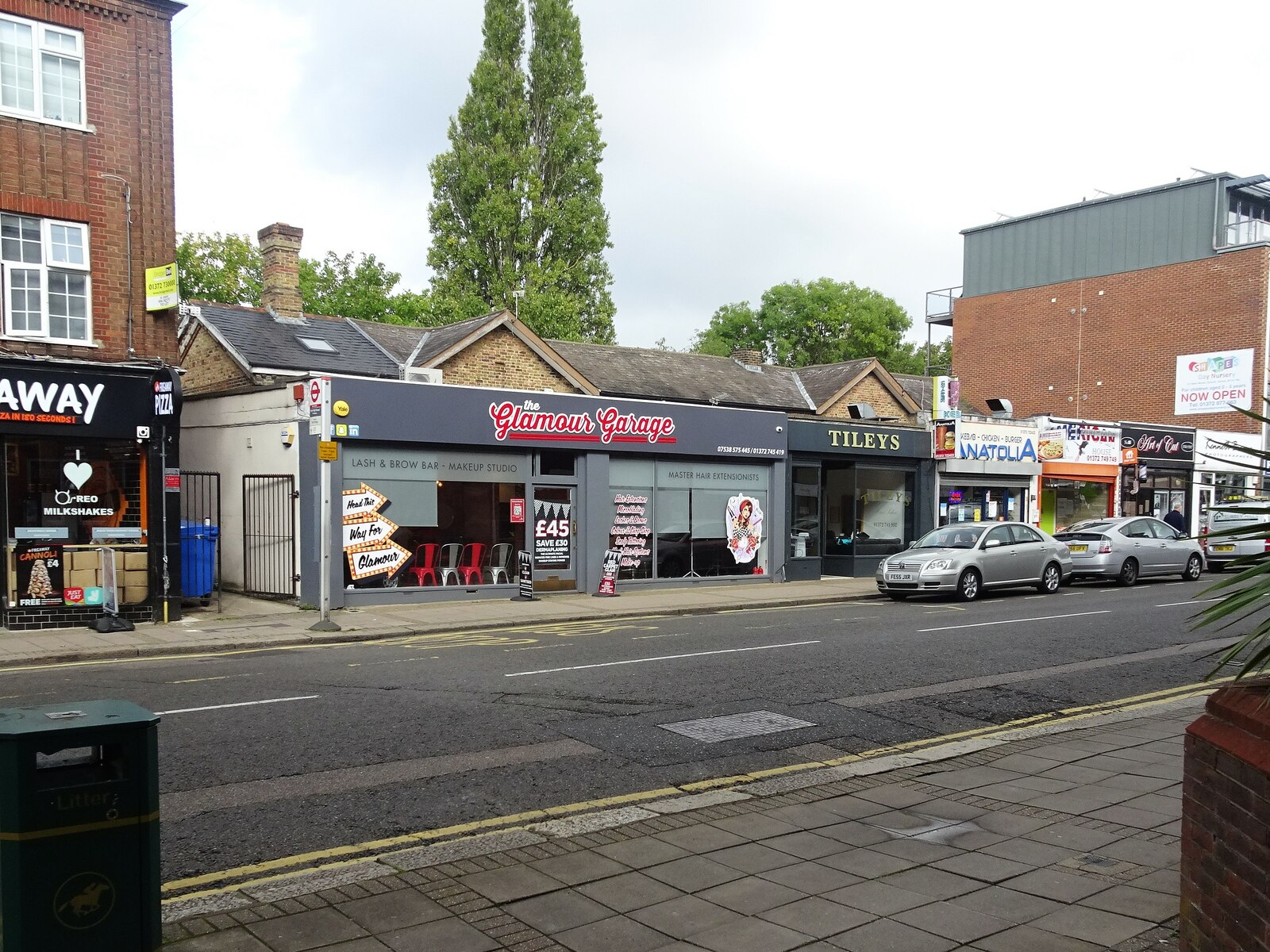
The old station building, now mostly obscured by modern shop fronts (date 2020).

The railway first reached the town in 1847 when an extension of the London, Brighton and South Coast Railway (LBSCR) from West Croydon was opened with a terminus in the former Station Road (now Upper High Street). The station was initially named Epsom, subsequently known as Epsom Town from c.1870 to c.1900, and again from 1923 to 1929.

In 1859 a joint venture between the LBSCR and the London and South Western Railway (LSWR) extended the LSWR from Wimbledon to Epsom, where it joined with the LBSCR, and then ran on to Leatherhead. The lines were connected south of the LBSCR station and a new Epsom station was established on the present site. However competition between the companies remained and the new station was operated by the LSWR only, with the tracks configured so that LBSCR trains ran non-stop on the central tracks.

In 1867 the line was extended south from Leatherhead to Dorking and Horsham, and in 1885 a branch from Leatherhead was built to Effingham Junction, where it connected to the line from Surbiton to Guildford. These extensions provided greater connections for Epsom to much of the rest of Surrey.

After the First World War, the railway companies were merged into the Southern Railway, which set about removing duplication. In 1929 work was completed on building a completely new station on the site of the former LSWR station and the tracks at Epsom were rearranged so that the two island platforms provided cross-platform interchange, although as late as the 1960s there were survivals of different systems of the lines of the two former railway companies in that the semaphore signals on the up platforms to London were upper quadrant (on platform 3) for trains to Victoria and London Bridge, but were lower quadrant (on platform 4) for the Waterloo line. The station was closed in 1929, (though some of the building remains abandoned and bricked up behind modern developments on Upper High Street, visible from the line from Ewell East).

Preceding station	Disused railways	Following station
Ewell East; Line and station open	London, Brighton and South Coast Railway; Sutton and Mole Valley Lines	Ashtead; Line and station open
