= Beddington Lane railway station =

Disused railway station in Beddington, London

Beddington Lane
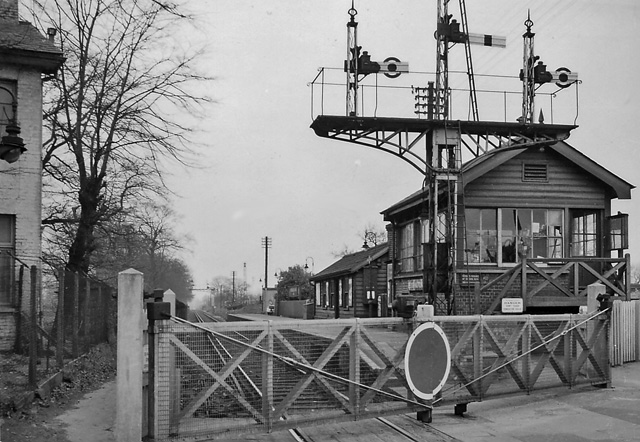
- View in 1961
- Interactive map of Beddington Lane

General information
- Location: Beddington
- Local authority: Sutton
- Owner: Wimbledon and Croydon Railway
- Number of platforms: 1

Key dates
- 22 October 1855: Opened
- 2 June 1997: Closed
- Replaced by: Beddington Lane tram stop

Other information
- Coordinates: 51.38961°N 0.14199°W

Beddington Lane railway station was a single-platform station on the West Croydon to Wimbledon Line. Situated in a semi-rural location, the nearest major settlements were Beddington and Mitcham.

== History ==
After the Surrey Iron Railway went out of business in 1846, a new railway was built on the line by the Wimbledon and Croydon Railway, which opened the station on 22 October 1855. It was originally named Beddington but was renamed in January 1887 to Beddington Lane. In 1919 it became Beddington Lane Halt, but reverted to Beddington Lane on 5 May 1969.

The station closed with the line after the last train ran on 31 May 1997. The station was demolished shortly after closure and Beddington Lane tram stop was built on the site.

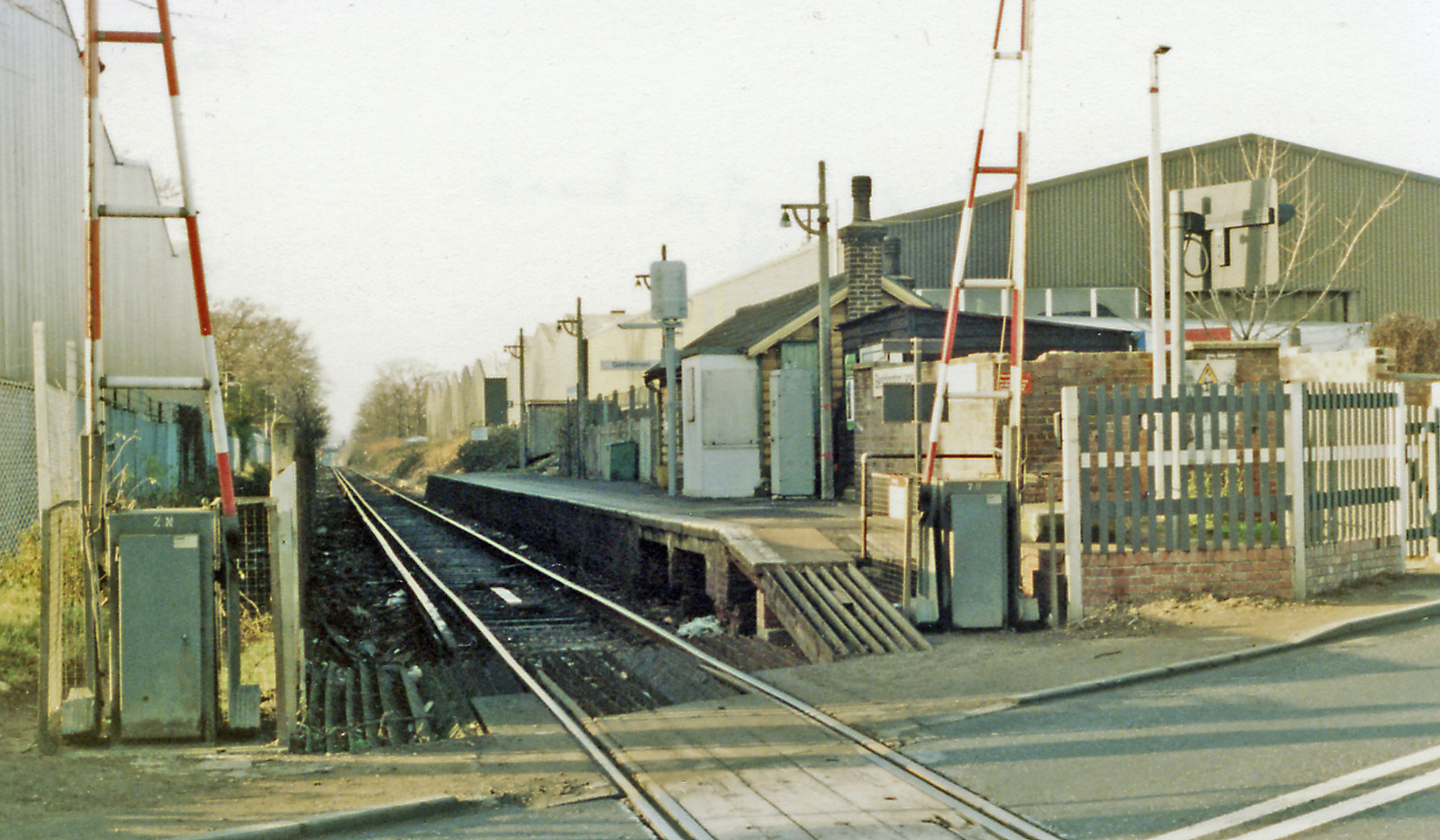
View in 1983

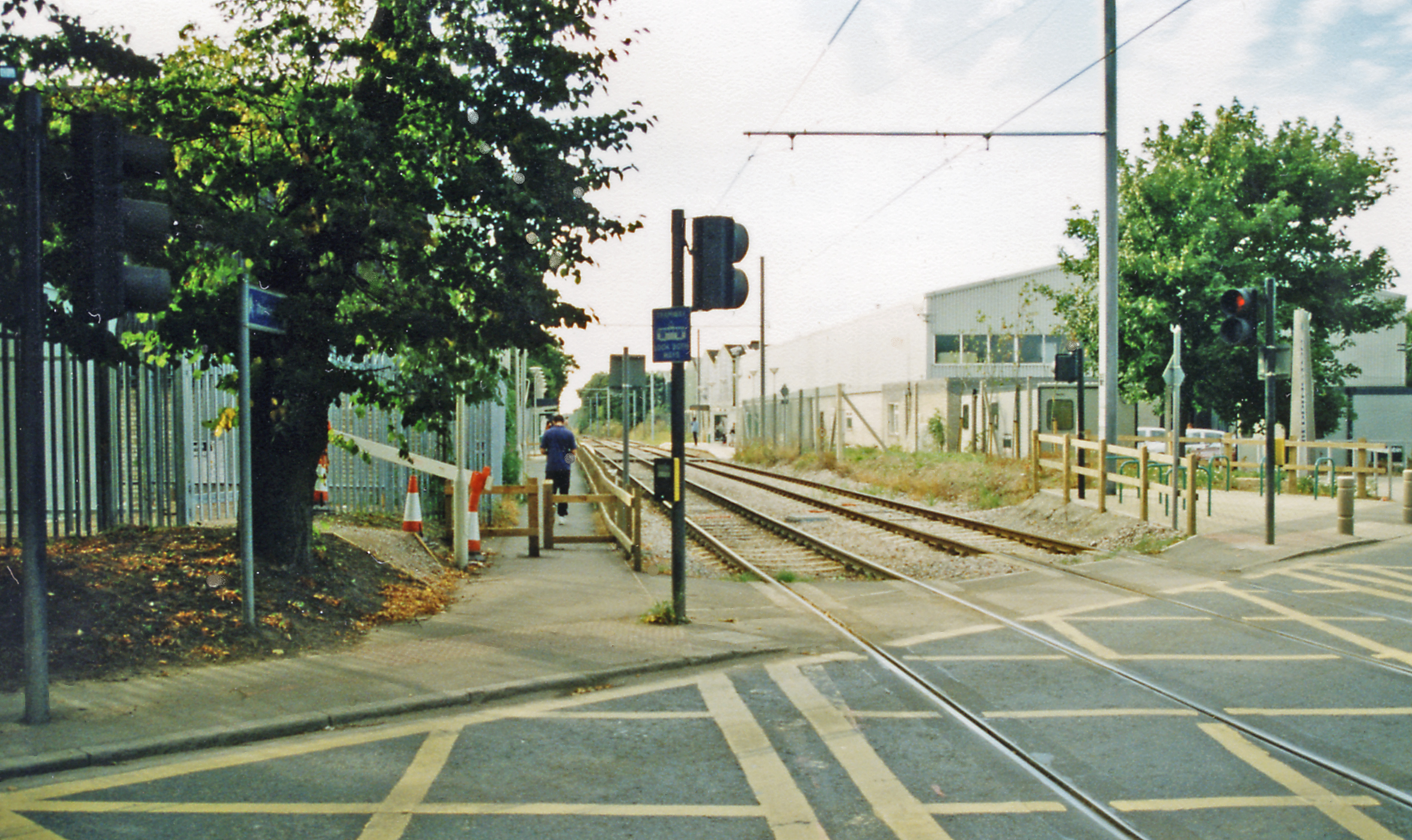
The tram stop in 2000

Preceding station	Disused railways	Following station
Mitcham Junction	Connex South Central; West Croydon to Wimbledon Line	Waddon Marsh
