= Bioregional =

Organization

- Founded: 1992 as 'Bioregional Development Group'
- Founder: Sue Riddlestone, Pooran Desai
- Type: Limited company and Charitable trust
- Purpose: Sustainability, Sustainable development, Environmentalism
- Location: London, UK
- Region served: World
- Method: Social enterprise, training
- Revenue: £1,380,000 Pound Sterling (2006-7)
- Website: bioregional.com

Bioregional is a British entrepreneurial charity, which aims to invent and deliver practical solutions for sustainability. It was founded in 1992 on the belief that overconsumption of resources was the driving force behind environmental degradation, and set out to find new ways for people to meet more of their needs from local resources.

== History ==
Bioregional was founded in 1994 by Sue Riddlestone OBE and Pooran Desai OBE, and began operations in the Sutton Ecology Centre. They first worked on local environmental projects, including the promotion of closed loop recycling in London and Surrey, reviving lavender production in Mitcham and Carshalton, setting up Croydon's TreeStation to turn waste municipal wood into biomass, and establishing the Bioregional Charcoal Company Ltd who help a network of local charcoal producers sell to major retail stores. These projects reflected Bioregional's aim of setting up social enterprises that could make the use of local and waste resources mainstream.

Bioregional began to expand in the late 1990s, and with the completion of BedZED they moved into their present offices in Hackbridge, London Borough of Sutton. Using the learnings from BedZED they developed the One Planet Living programme with WWF, which is the framework for all sustainable communities projects and has an equal influence over their vision as the original bioregionalism focus. Currently a One Planet Living communities is being built in Brighton.

Bioregional currently has around 40 staff in London, as well as regional offices in China, Canada, South Africa, Kenya, Greece, Mexico, and Australia.

Founded in 2005, Bioregional North America is an affiliated Canadian non-profit organization that specializes in fostering sustainable behavior change and collaborative consumption amongst occupants in new and existing buildings across the United States and Canada.

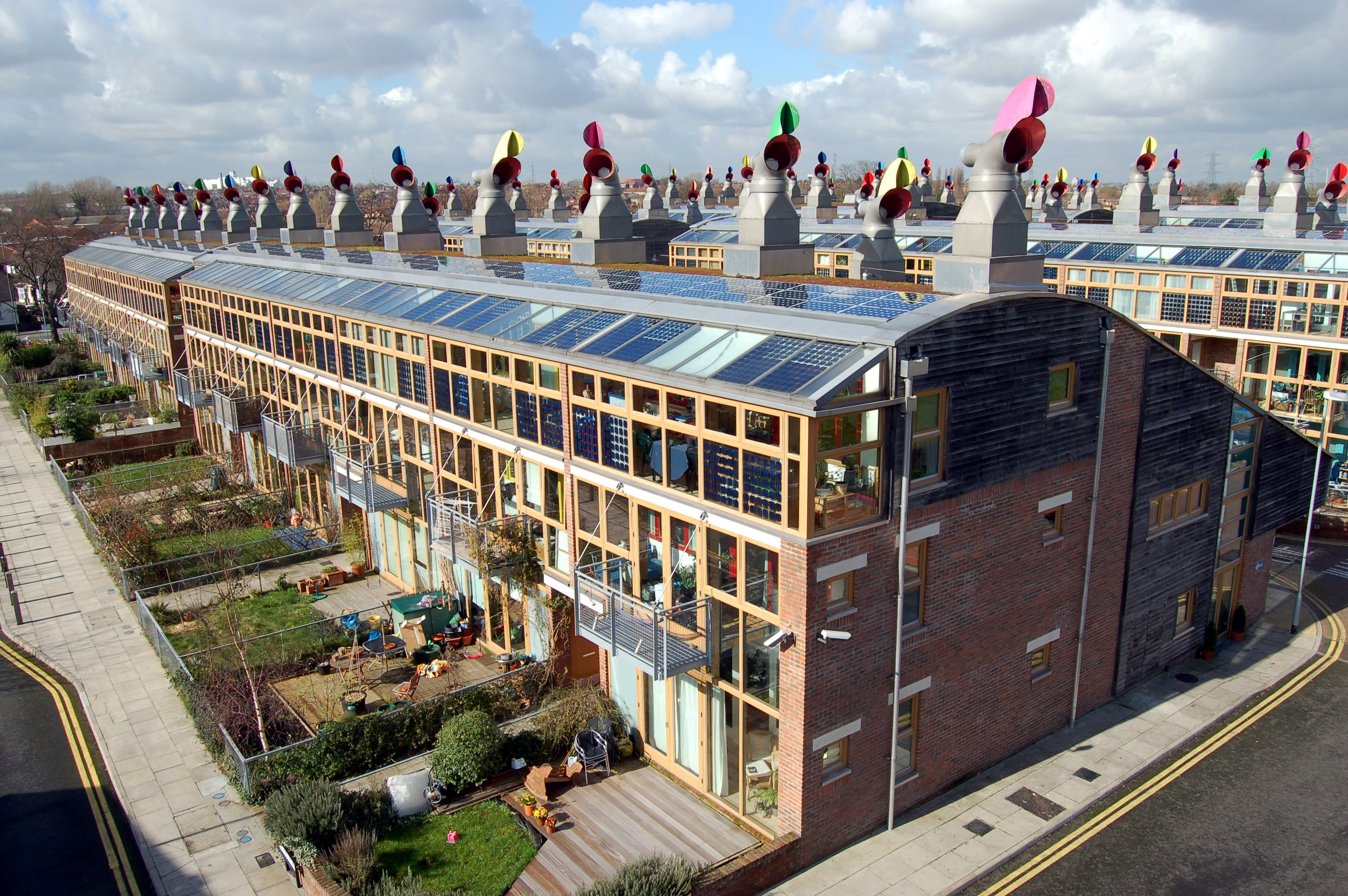
BedZED the UK's largest eco-village.

== Awards ==
- See also awards won for the BedZED project
- 2024 - Business Green - Consultancy of the Year
- 2011 - Bioregional's founders Sue Riddlestone OBE and Pooran Desai OBE were named Social Entrepreneurs of the Year at the Davos World Economic Forum by the Schwab Foundation for Social Entrepreneurship
- 2009 - Bioregional's founders Sue Riddlestone OBE and Pooran Desai OBE won the Skoll Social Entrepreneur Award.
- June 2007 - Observer ethical awards for Bioregional MiniMills, Invention of the year.
- May 2006 - Ashden Award for Sustainable Energy for Croydon TreeStation
