= Epsom railway station =

Railway station in Surrey, England

Coordinates: 51°20′02″N 0°16′08″W

Epsom
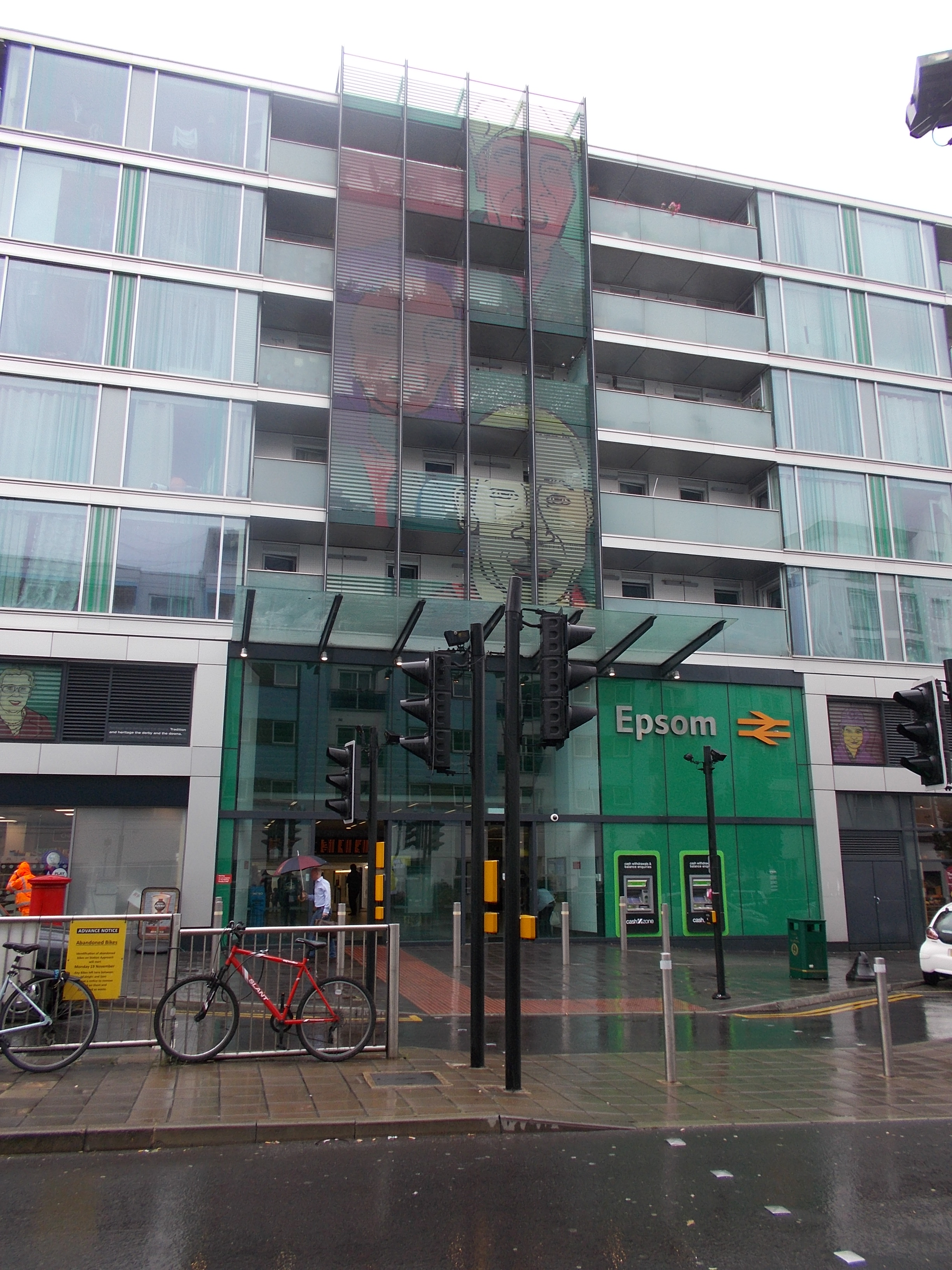
- The station in July 2019
- Interactive map of Epsom

General information
- Location: Epsom
- Local authority: Borough of Epsom and Ewell
- Grid reference: TQ206609
- Managed by: Southern
- Station code: EPS
- DfT category: C1
- Number of platforms: 4
- Accessible: Yes
- Fare zone: A

National Rail annual entry and exit
- 2020–21: ▼0.967 million
- Interchange: ▼57,889
- 2021–22: ▲2.334 million
- Interchange: ▲0.126 million
- 2022–23: ▲2.887 million
- Interchange: ▼0.113 million
- 2023–24: ▲3.135 million
- Interchange: ▲0.116 million
- 2024–25: ▲3.342 million
- Interchange: ▲0.118 million

Key dates
- 1 February 1859: opened
- 1929: station rebuilt

Other information
- External links: Departures; Facilities

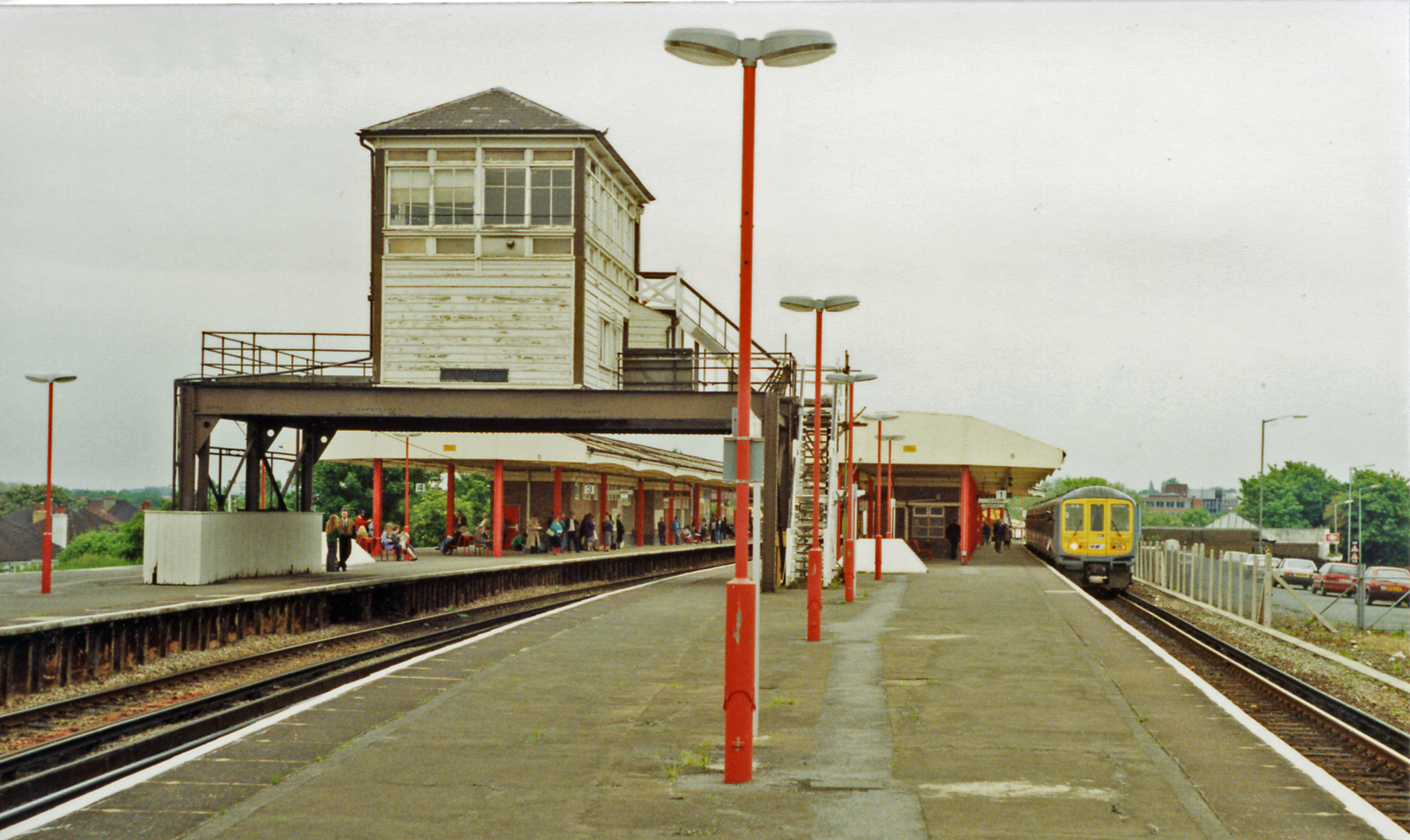
View north east from the west end of the down platform with signal box in 1991

Epsom railway station serves the town of Epsom in Surrey, England. It is located off Waterloo Road and is less than two minutes' walk from the town's high street. It is 14 miles 18 chains (22.9 km) down the line from London Waterloo.

== History ==
The railway first reached the town in 1847 when an extension of the London, Brighton and South Coast Railway (LBSCR) from West Croydon was opened with a terminus in the former Station Road (now Upper High Street). This station was initially named Epsom, subsequently renamed Epsom Town.

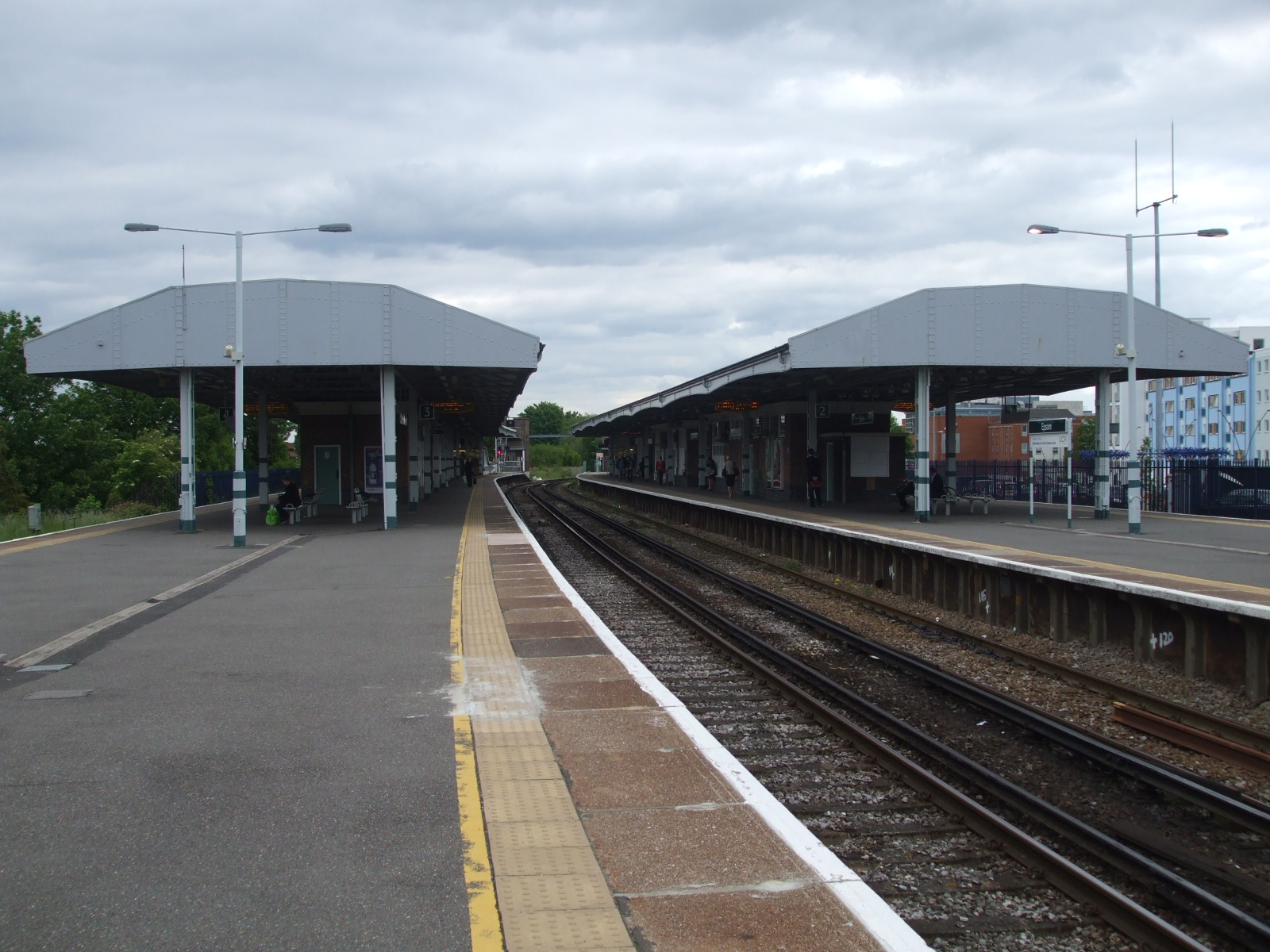
View from the platforms looking north.

Wimbledon and Dorking, and Epsom and Leatherhead Railways (Epsom Joint Station) Act 1859
- Act of Parliament
- Parliament of the United Kingdom
- Long title: An Act for providing a Joint Station at Epsom for the Use of the Wimbledon and Dorking and Epsom and Leatherhead Railway Companies; and for other Purposes.
- Citation: 22 Vict. c. iii

Dates
- Royal assent: 8 April 1859

In 1859 a joint venture between the LBSCR and the London and South Western Railway (LSWR) extended the LSWR from Wimbledon to Epsom, where it joined with the LBSCR, and then ran on to Leatherhead. The lines were connected south of the LBSCR station and a new Epsom station was established on the present site by the Wimbledon and Dorking, and Epsom and Leatherhead Railways (Epsom Joint Station) Act 1859 (22 Vict. c. iii). However competition between the companies remained and the new station was operated by the LSWR only, with the tracks configured so that LBSCR trains ran non-stop on the central tracks.

In 1867 the line was extended south from Leatherhead to Dorking and Horsham, and in 1885 a branch from Leatherhead was built to Effingham Junction, where it connected to the line from Surbiton to Guildford. These extensions provided greater connections for Epsom to much of the rest of Surrey.

After the First World War, the railway companies were merged into the Southern Railway, which set about removing duplication. In 1929 work was completed on building a completely new station on the site of the former LSWR station and the tracks at Epsom were rearranged so that the two island platforms provided cross-platform interchange, although as late as the 1960s there were survivals of different systems of the lines of the two former railway companies in that the semaphore signals on the up platforms to London were upper quadrant (on platform 3) for trains to Victoria and London Bridge, but were lower quadrant (on platform 4) for the Waterloo line. The former LBSCR station Epsom Town was closed in 1929, (though some of the building remains abandoned and bricked up behind modern developments on Upper High Street, visible from the line from Ewell East).

When Thameslink services started in 1988 by British Rail its secondary southern route ran to Epsom via Elephant & Castle, West Croydon and Sutton, continuing to Guildford. Thameslink services to Epsom were withdrawn in 1994.

For many years the southern ends of the platforms had a large signal box above them, dating from 1929. It was not listed, and despite extensive roof repairs it was demolished in March 1992.

The Oyster pay-as-you-go facility was extended to Epsom on 25 February 2019, allowing Oyster cards and contactless cards to be used.

== Derailment incident: 12 September 2006 ==
Train 2D57, the 19:09 service from London Waterloo to Effingham Junction, became derailed on the approach to Epsom at about 19:42 on Tuesday 12 September 2006. The train was formed of two four-car class 455 electric multiple units (EMUs). The leading bogie of the fourth coach was derailed towards the left as it passed over a set of trailing points on a right-hand curve at about 17 miles per hour (27 km/h). The train came to a stop partially in Epsom station, and passengers were quickly evacuated onto the platform. There were no injuries, and there was only minor damage to the train and the track.

As the train approached Epsom, the driver shut off power and reduced speed to comply with the 20 miles per hour (32 km/h) permanent speed restriction round the curve into the station, entering the curve at 19.2 mph (30.9 km/h). He felt a judder, and looked back, observing blue flashes and smoke from the rear of the train. He assumed there was a fault with the train, and attempted to coast into the station. As the fourth coach came into his field of vision, the driver saw that it was derailed and made an emergency brake application. The train then stopped within five seconds.

In the report by the Rail Accident Investigation Branch into the accident, the maintenance of track and points was heavily criticised. The removal of a remote rail lubricator by Network Rail was also criticised.

== Redevelopment ==
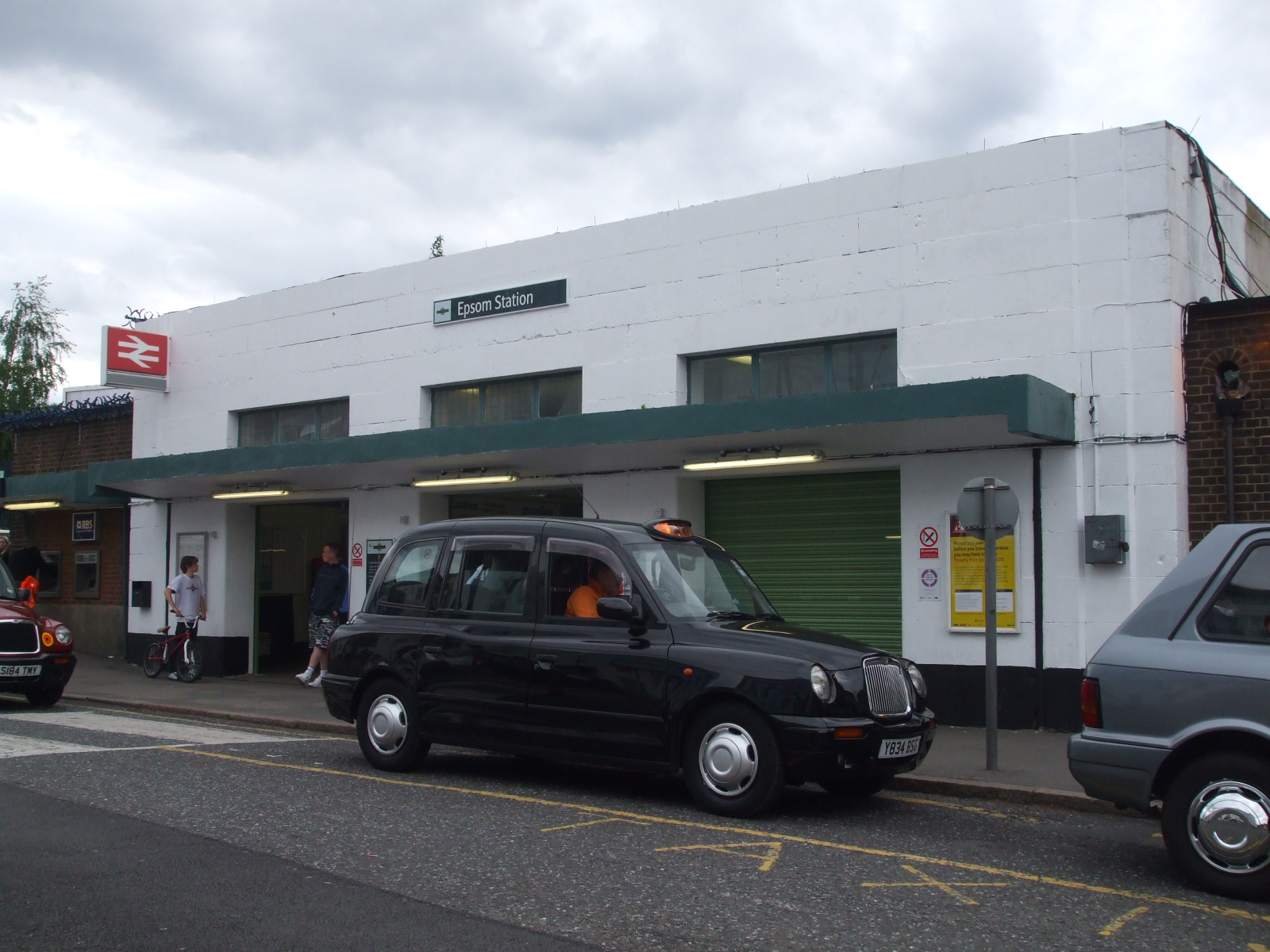
The old station building in 2009

Redevelopment of Epsom station began in November 2010 and was completed in July 2013.

== Services ==
Services at Epsom are operated by Southern and South Western Railway.

The typical off-peak service in trains per hour is:

- 2 tph to London Victoria via Hackbridge
- 2 tph to London Bridge via West Croydon
- 2 tph to London Waterloo via Wimbledon
- 3 tph to Dorking of which 1 continues to Horsham
- 1 tph to Guildford

Additional services call at the station during the peak hours.

On Saturday evenings (after approximately 18:45) and on Sundays, there is no service south of Dorking to Horsham.

Preceding station	National Rail	Following station
Ewell East	Southern Sutton & Mole Valley Lines	Ashtead
Ewell West	South Western Railway Mole Valley Line	Ashtead
	Disused railways	
Leatherhead	Network SouthEast Thameslink	Sutton
