= Ewell East railway station =

National Rail station in Surrey, England

Ewell East
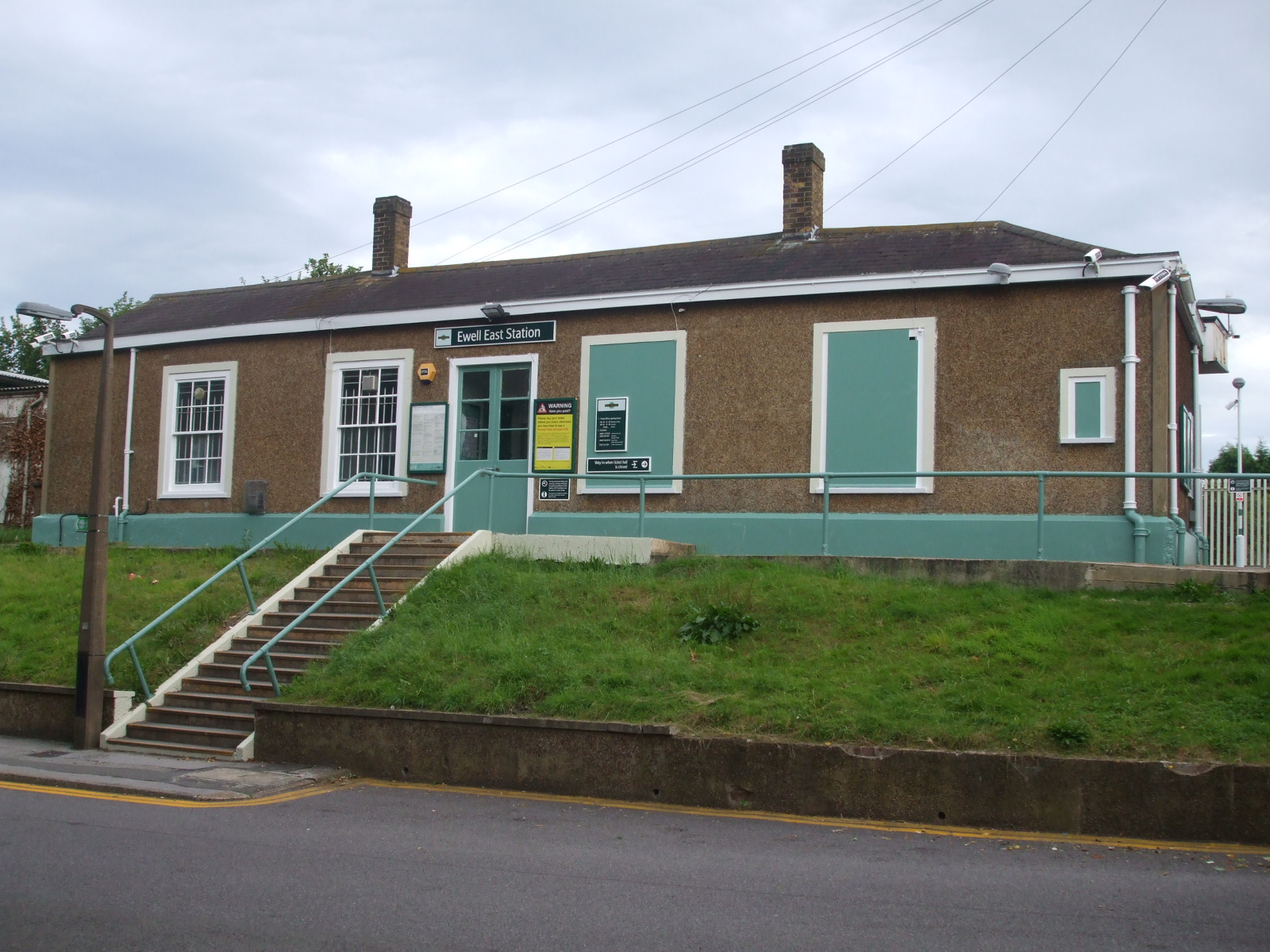
- Station building
- Interactive map of Ewell East

General information
- Location: Ewell
- Local authority: Borough of Epsom and Ewell
- Managed by: Southern
- Station code: EWE
- DfT category: E
- Number of platforms: 2
- Accessible: Yes
- Fare zone: 6

National Rail annual entry and exit
- 2020–21: ▼0.168 million
- 2021–22: ▲0.389 million
- 2022–23: ▲0.425 million
- 2023–24: ▲0.452 million
- 2024–25: ▲0.490 million

Key dates
- 10 May 1847: Opened

Other information
- External links: Departures; Facilities
- Coordinates: 51.3451°N 0.2419°W

Ewell East is one of two stations serving the town of Ewell in Surrey, England. It has two platforms, one for services to Sutton, West Croydon and London, the other for services to Epsom. The ticket office and main entrance is on the London-bound side, accessed from Cheam Road. On the Epsom-bound side, there is an additional entrance from a footpath linking the Cheam Road with Reigate Road near the North East Surrey College of Technology.

It was opened on 10 May 1847 with the Croydon and Epsom Railway. This was subsumed into the London, Brighton and South Coast Railway. Train service is now provided by Southern.

Ewell East has been part of London fare zone 6 since January 2008.

== Services ==
All services at Ewell East are operated by Southern using Class 377 EMUs.

The typical off-peak service in trains per hour is:

- 1 tph to London Victoria via Hackbridge
- 2 tph to London Bridge via West Croydon
- 2 tph to Epsom
- 1 tph to Horsham via Dorking

On Saturday evenings (after approximately 18:45) and on Sundays, there is no service south of Dorking to Horsham.

Preceding station	National Rail	Following station
Cheam	Southern Sutton & Mole Valley Lines	Epsom

== Gallery ==
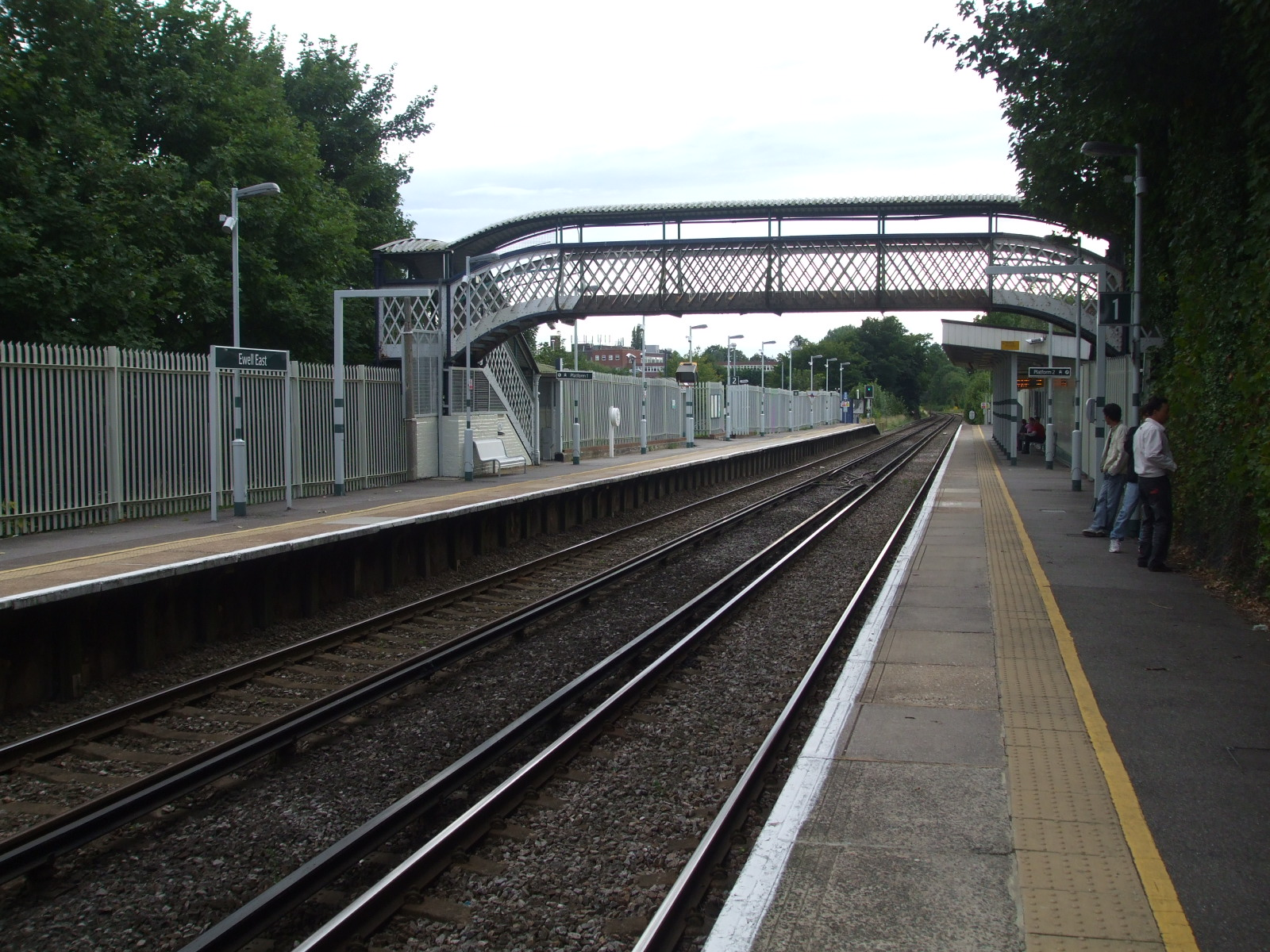
Platforms looking south

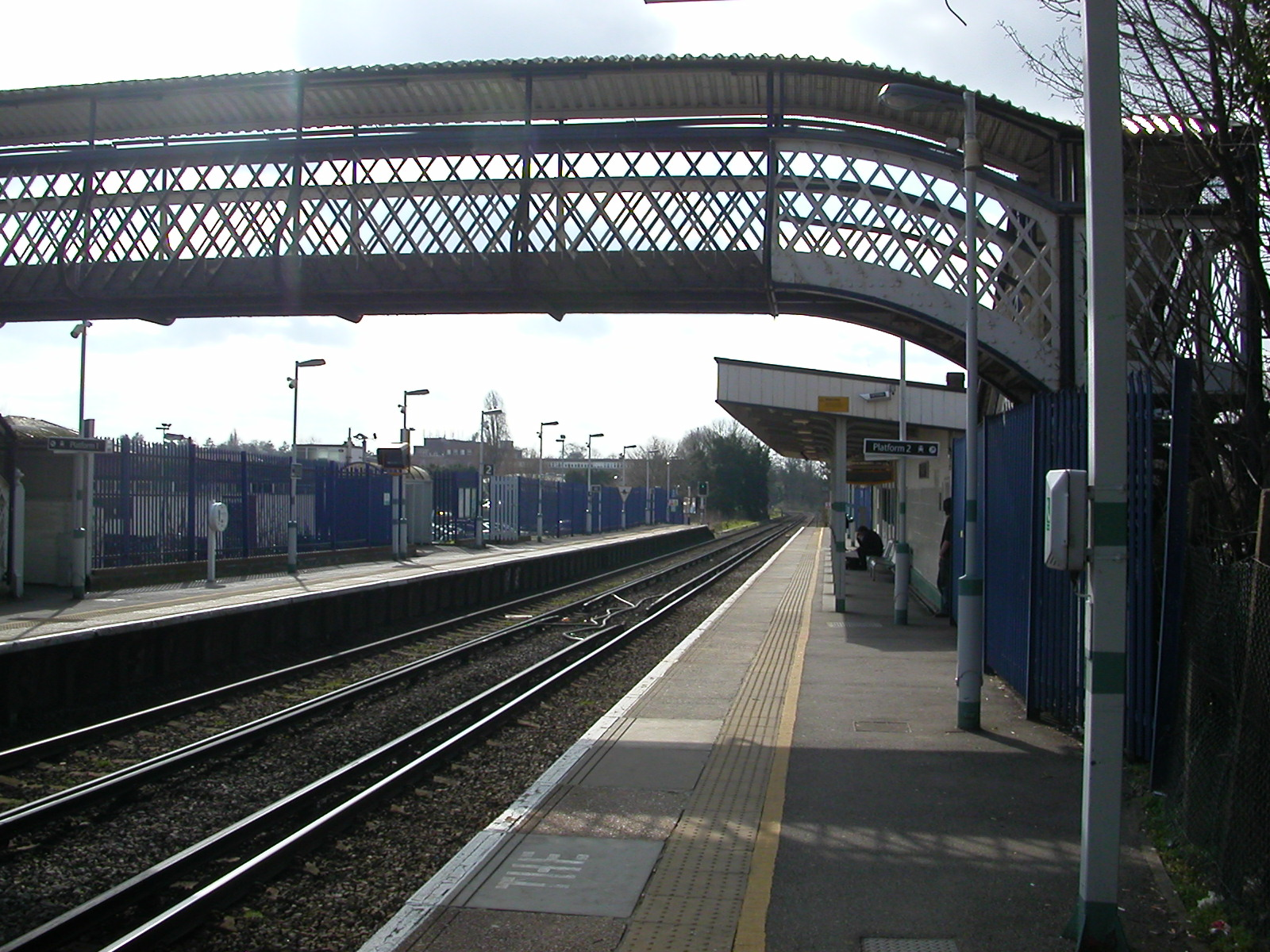
The footbridge and platforms, looking south towards Epsom

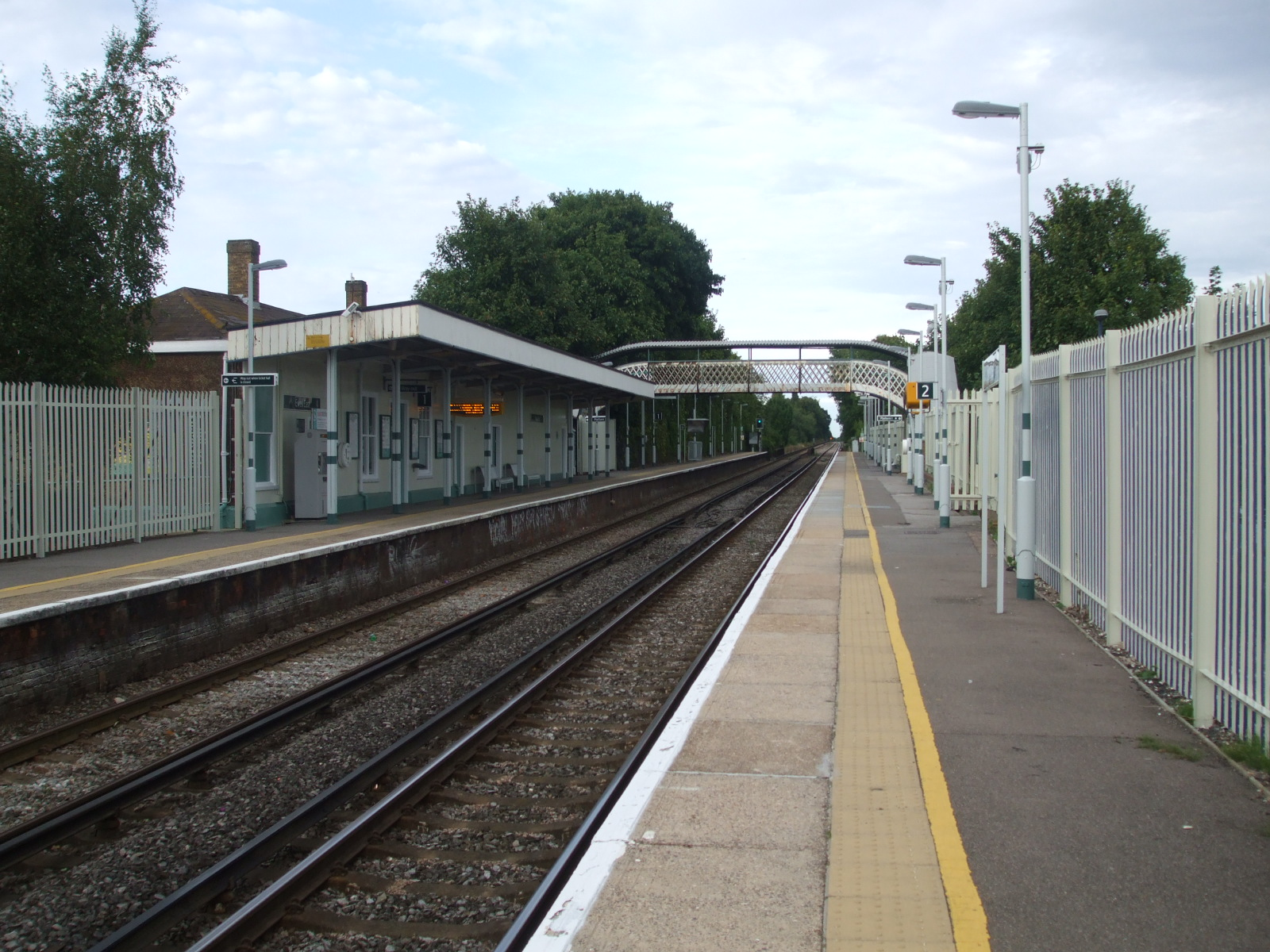
Platforms looking north

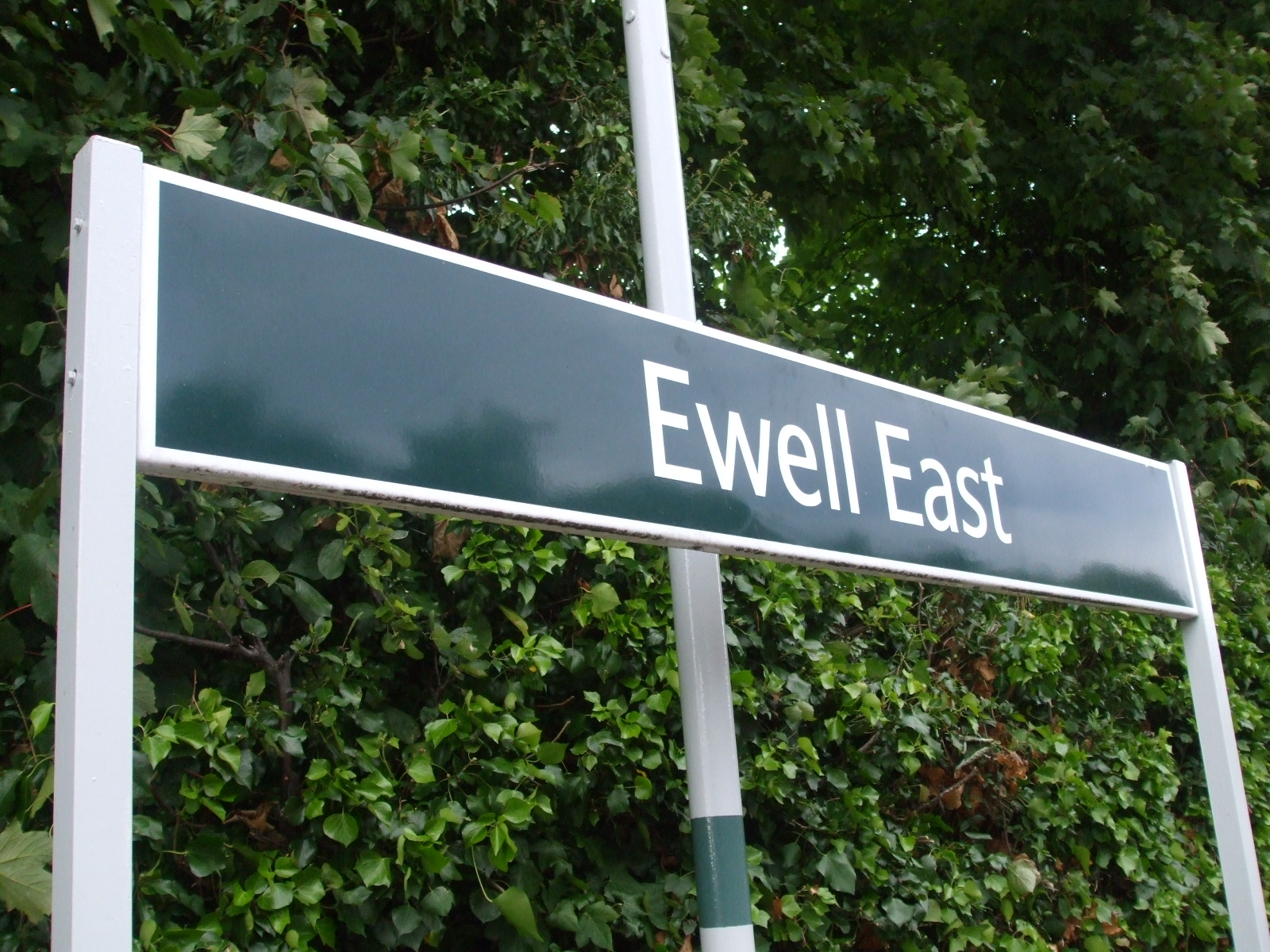
Platform signage in Southern colours

== See also ==
- Ewell West railway station
