= Therapia Lane tram stop =

Tramlink tram stop in London, England

Therapia Lane
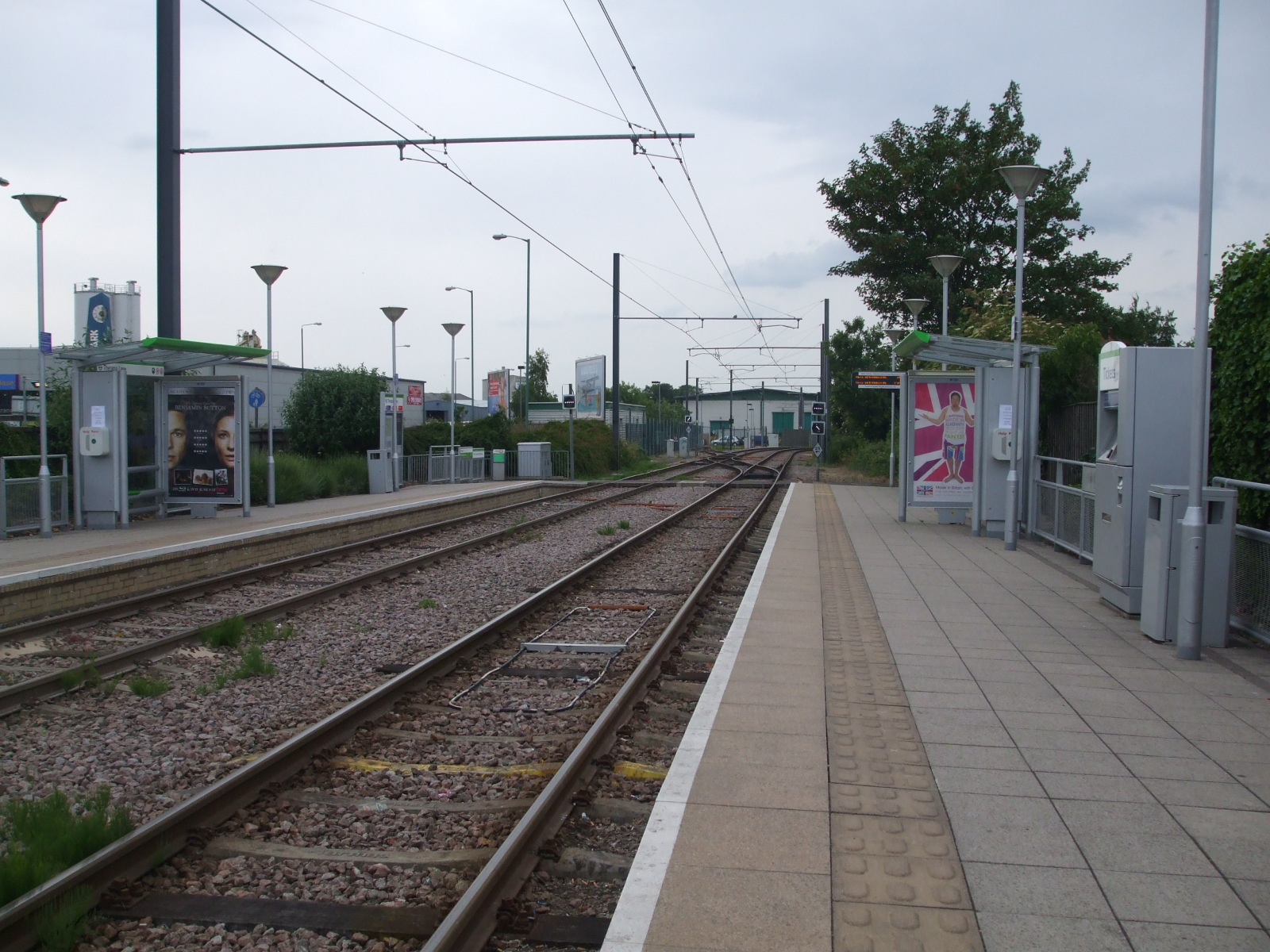
- Looking west

General information
- Location: Therapia Lane, Sutton
- Coordinates: 51.3857°N 0.1291°W
- Operated by: Tramlink
- Platforms: 2

Construction
- Structure type: At-grade
- Accessible: Yes

Other information
- Status: Unstaffed
- Website: Official website

History
- Opened: 30 May 2000
Location
- Location in Sutton

Therapia Lane tram stop is a light rail stop on the Tramlink service close to the Purley Way commercial area. The stop is in the London Borough of Sutton close to the boundary with Croydon. It is one of two Tramlink stops within Sutton borough, the other being Beddington Lane.

Just to the west of the stop is Therapia Lane Depot Staff Halt, a two platform stop used only by staff getting to or from Therapia Lane depot, and not permitted for public use. The stop had been out of use since 21 March 2020 due to its narrow short platforms preventing social distancing during the COVID-19 pandemic. However, as of 2025 the stop is still regularly used.

== Services ==
The typical off-peak service in trams per hour from Therapia Lane is:

- 6 tph in each direction between Beckenham Junction and Wimbledon
- 6 tph in each direction between Elmers End and Wimbledon

Services are operated using Bombardier CR4000 and Stadler Variobahn model low-floor trams.

| Preceding station | Tramlink | Following station |
|---|---|---|
| Beddington Lane towards Wimbledon | Tramlink; Wimbledon to Beckenham Junction | Ampere Way towards Beckenham Junction |
| Beddington Lane towards Wimbledon | Tramlink; Wimbledon to Elmers End | Ampere Way towards Elmers End |

== Connections ==
London Buses routes 463 and S4 serve the tram stop.

Free interchange for journeys made within an hour is available between trams and buses as part of Transport for London's Hopper Fare.
