= Hackbridge =

Coordinates: 51.3738°N 0.1509°W

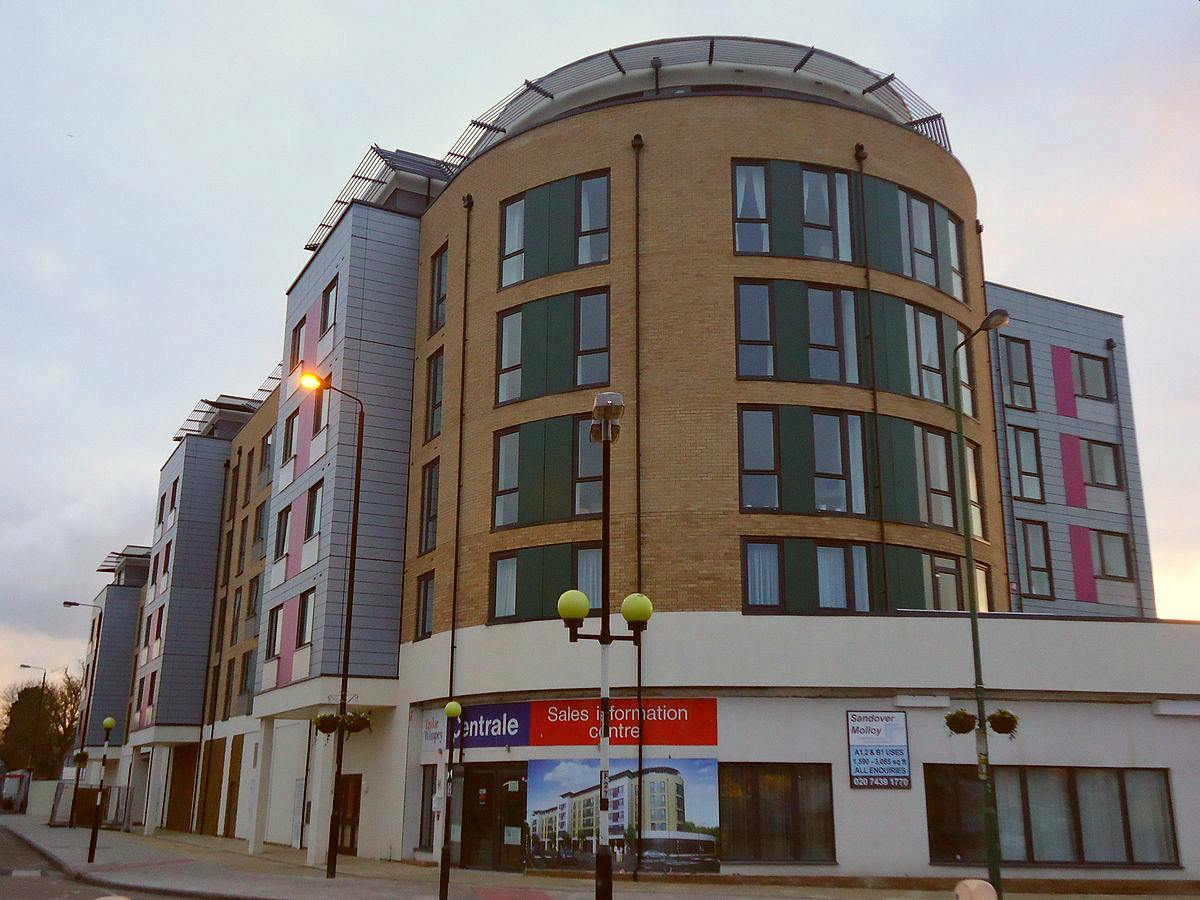
- 2013 apartment building in London Road opposite Hackbridge railway station

- Location within Greater London
- OS grid reference: TQ285685
- London borough: Sutton
- Ceremonial county: Greater London
- Region: London
- Country: England
- Sovereign state: United Kingdom
- Post town: WALLINGTON
- Postcode district: SM6
- Dialling code: 020
- Police: Metropolitan
- Fire: London
- Ambulance: London
- UK Parliament: Carshalton and Wallington
- London Assembly: Croydon and Sutton

Hackbridge is a suburb in the London Borough of Sutton, south-west London, just over two miles north-east of the town of Sutton itself. It is 8.8 miles (15 km) south-west of Charing Cross.

Hackbridge is part of the Hackbridge ward for elections to Sutton London Borough Council.

== Toponymy ==
The district takes its name from Hack Bridge, a bridge over the River bridge", or "bridge of the hogs". Early versions include Hakebridge, Hagbridge and Hogbridge.

== Hackbridge Masterplan and New Mill Quarter ==
The London Borough of Sutton is working to make Hackbridge the "UK's first truly sustainable suburb". There has been a regeneration scheme in Hackbridge which has a number of developments on many sites. These are mentioned as part of the Hackbridge Regeneration. Detailed plans include proposals for new eco-friendly homes, more shops, leisure and community facilities, jobs, sustainable transport and pedestrian/cycle initiatives, improved networks and open spaces.

A key part of this is a £150m plan to redevelop the one million square foot former Felnex industrial estate, which in 2016 gained redevelopment approval from the Greater London Authority. The development, described as "one of the greenest places to live in the UK", is to be centred on a public square and will see 725 homes built, as well as a new supermarket, doctor's surgery, care home, offices and workshops, additional shops and a bus interchange. Work was expected to begin as soon as detailed consent was obtained for the first phase, which was expected to be in early 2013.

One of the housing developments is the Barratt-built New Mill Quarter which is providing 440 new homes with commercial and retail space. It is the largest new residential development in the area.

== BedZED ==
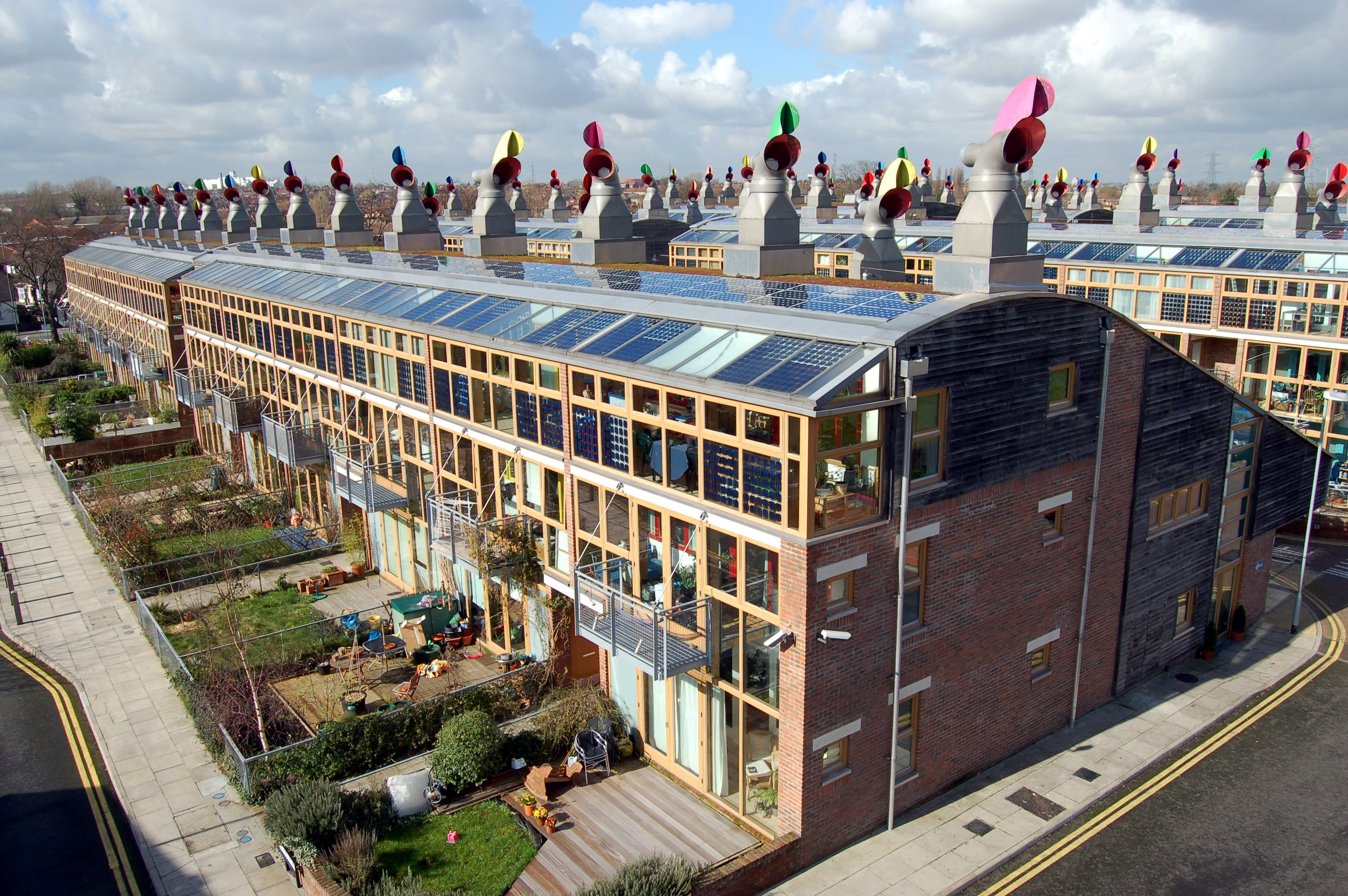
General view of BedZED

Hackbridge has already achieved success in its green agenda in the form of the BedZED (Beddington Zero Energy Development) eco-friendly housing development, around 500 yards north of Hackbridge railway station, which is in Zone 4. Designed to create zero carbon emissions, it was the first large scale community to do so. BedZED utilises a number of innovative technologies to enable it to operate with zero energy use. It has attracted wide interest over the past decade since it was built, and, among other examples of recognition, it was shortlisted for the Stirling Prize for architecture in 2003. Key features of BedZED include:

- Zero energy — The project is designed to use only energy from renewable sources generated on site. There are 777 square metres (8,360 sq ft) of solar panels.
- High quality — The apartments are finished to a high standard to attract the eco-minded urban professional.
- Energy efficient — The houses face south to take advantage of solar gain, are triple glazed, and have high thermal insulation.
- Water efficient — Most rain water falling on the site is collected and reused.

== Geography ==
Hackbridge is located three miles away from the town of Mitcham and is located 1.3 miles away from the area of Wallington

Location

Hackbridge is located on the River Wandle in the London Borough of Sutton, about almost three miles north east of the town of Sutton itself.

Architecture

Hackbridge has a fairly wide range of architecture, but is mainly Edwardian and early 20th century in the central shopping area with surrounding suburbs in Tudorbethan semi-detached style - a number of Post War Modernist social housing schemes have been demolished in recent years.

There are also a number of 21st century buildings, the most notable being the environmentally-friendly BedZED development (see above); but a further example is the large and just completed (in 2013) Centrale apartment building (see photo) located in London Road, opposite the railway station. The former Durand Close Council estate is also being regenerated as a mixed tenure development by the Lavender Housing Partnership over the period 2003–2018.

Churches

The parish church of Hackbridge was built in 1931 (see photo of interior). The architect was H.P. Burke-Downing, and it is located opposite BedZED on the London Road.

Open Space

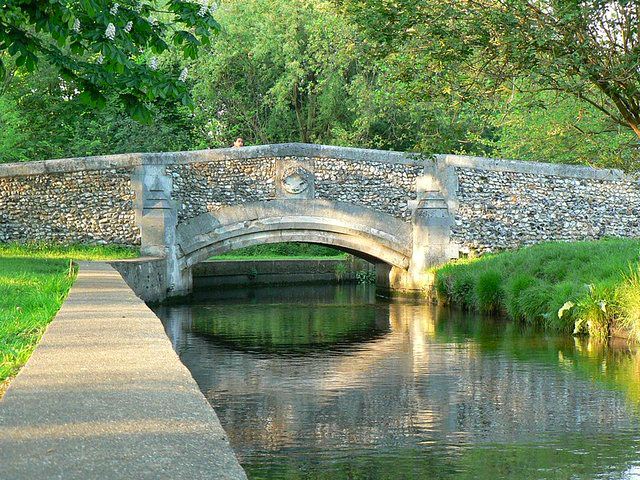
The River Wandle within Beddington Park

Beddington Park, through which the River Wandle flows, is a quarter of a mile (400 metres) south of Hackbridge railway station. It is nearly 100 acres (40 hectares) in size and is maintained by the London Borough of Sutton. It was originally part of the Deer Park attached to Carew Manor, a grand country house built in the Tudor period, which stands to this day. It is a large area of open grassland with small clumps of trees, with an area of more formal gardens near the Grange restaurant, as well as the lake and pond. The main lake in the south west of the park was originally a mill pond. There are many paths and a number of ornamental bridges (see photo), which cross the stream which feeds the lake: this is part of the River Wandle (a Thames tributary), and the park is on the Wandle Trail. Part of the park is managed as a wildlife site.

== Sport ==
Nearest professional football clubs:

- Crystal Palace F.C.
- Sutton United

Nearest Non League football clubs:

- Tooting and Mitcham United F.C. play approximately 0.5 miles away from Hackbridge.
- Carshalton Athletic F.C. play approximately 0.5 miles away from Hackbridge.
- Streatham-Croydon RFC play approximately 3.2 - 4.0 miles away from Hackbridge

== Education ==
Primary education

- Hackbridge Primary School

== Famous past residents ==
- Tracey Ullman grew up in Hackbridge.
- Tony Power: Songwriter

== Transport ==
Rail

Hackbridge railway station is served by train services to London Victoria, London Blackfriars, London Bridge, Sutton, Wimbledon, London St Pancras, St Albans and Luton. Trains are operated by Thameslink and Southern. The station is in Travel Card Zone 4 and the journey time to London Victoria is 25 minutes.

Bus

Hackbridge is served by Transport for London bus routes: 80, 127 and 151.

Tram

The nearest Tramlink stop to Hackbridge is at Mitcham Junction. Trams go to Wimbledon and Croydon.

== Dogs' Home ==
Hackbridge was home to the first country dogs' home, opened by the Duke and Duchess of Portland in 1898.
