= Durand Close =

Coordinates: 51.3796°N 0.1665°W

Durand Close was a housing estate situated at grid reference TQ 277 661 in Carshalton, Greater London. It held over 300 homes when it was built in the 1960s. In 2009, the estate was demolished to make way for an £83m redevelopment by Rydon Construction Ltd. The River Wandle passes through the estate from Culvers Avenue, with another opening at Buckhurst Avenue and also exits at Buckhurst Avenue.

== History ==
Records have shown that before the estate was built, the estate was once a Manor House called the 'Limes'. The manor house was replaced by a horticultural nursery between the two world wars.

== Facilities ==
When the estate was first built there were twelve blocks of maisonettes and flats, a sheltered accommodation for the elderly, an underground carpark, a basketball court, playing fields, a playground, a newsagents, a green grocers and a launderette.

The launderette later became a hairdresser. When the hairdresser closed, it became a community centre named The Durand Centre. When the owner of the green grocery died, the owners of the newsagent brought the green grocery and removed the wall between them to make the shop bigger. The underground car park was closed and half of it was converted into the new Riverside Centre in 1999. The carpark remained closed.

The children's playground was demolished in the 1990s and was paved over in 2001, and a new park was added in the heart of the estate.

The Durand Centre was closed in 2000 when the Riverside Centre opened to the public. In 2003, the vacant lot became the Lavender Housing Office.
