= Beddington Lane tram stop =

Tramlink tram stop in London, England

Beddington Lane
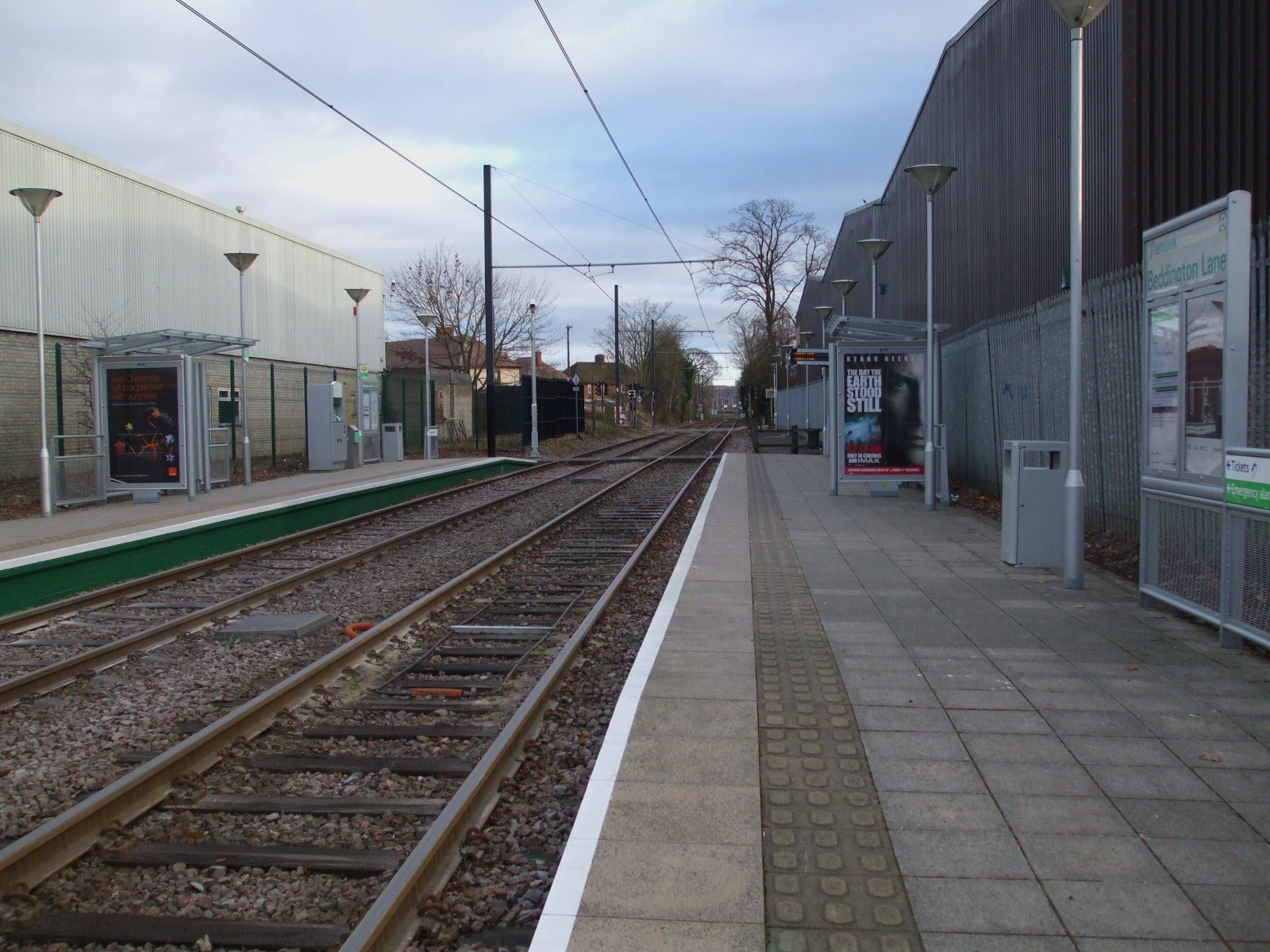
- Looking east

General information
- Location: Beddington Lane, Sutton
- Coordinates: 51.3895°N 0.1429°W
- Operated by: Tramlink
- Platforms: 2

Construction
- Structure type: At-grade
- Accessible: Yes

Other information
- Status: Unstaffed
- Website: Official website

History
- Opened: 30 May 2000

Key dates
- 31 May 1997: Beddington Lane station closed
Location
- Location in Sutton

Beddington Lane tram stop is a stop on the Tramlink tramway. There was previously a railway station on this site, on the single track line from Wimbledon to West Croydon, which closed in 1997 in order for it to be converted for Tramlink use. The stop is accessible from the east from Beddington Lane, and also from the pathway leading to the west and south. In late 2014, the track immediately to the west of the tram stop was doubled, though further west the bridge carrying trams over the main line at Mitcham Junction is still single-track.

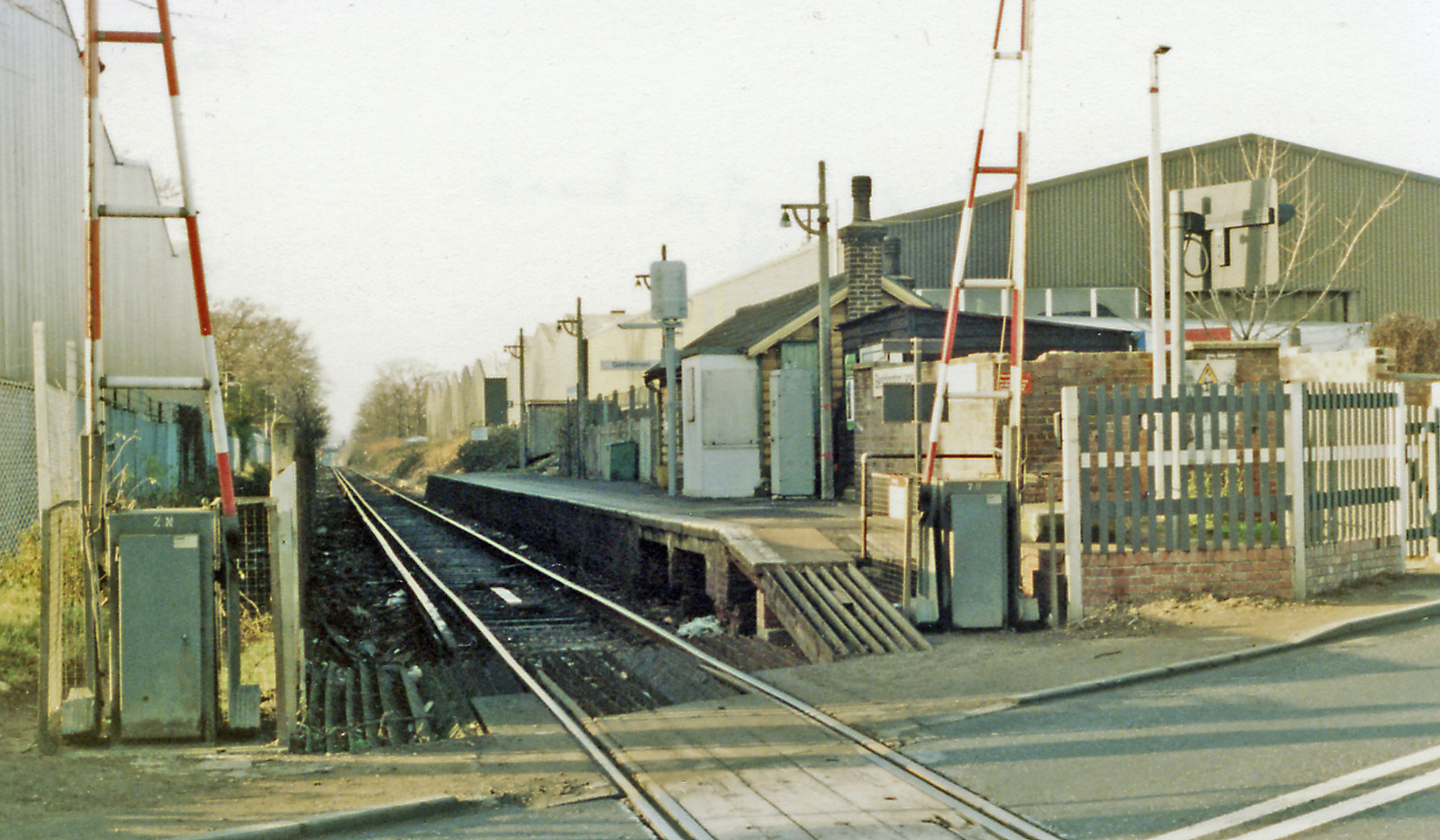
View in 1983

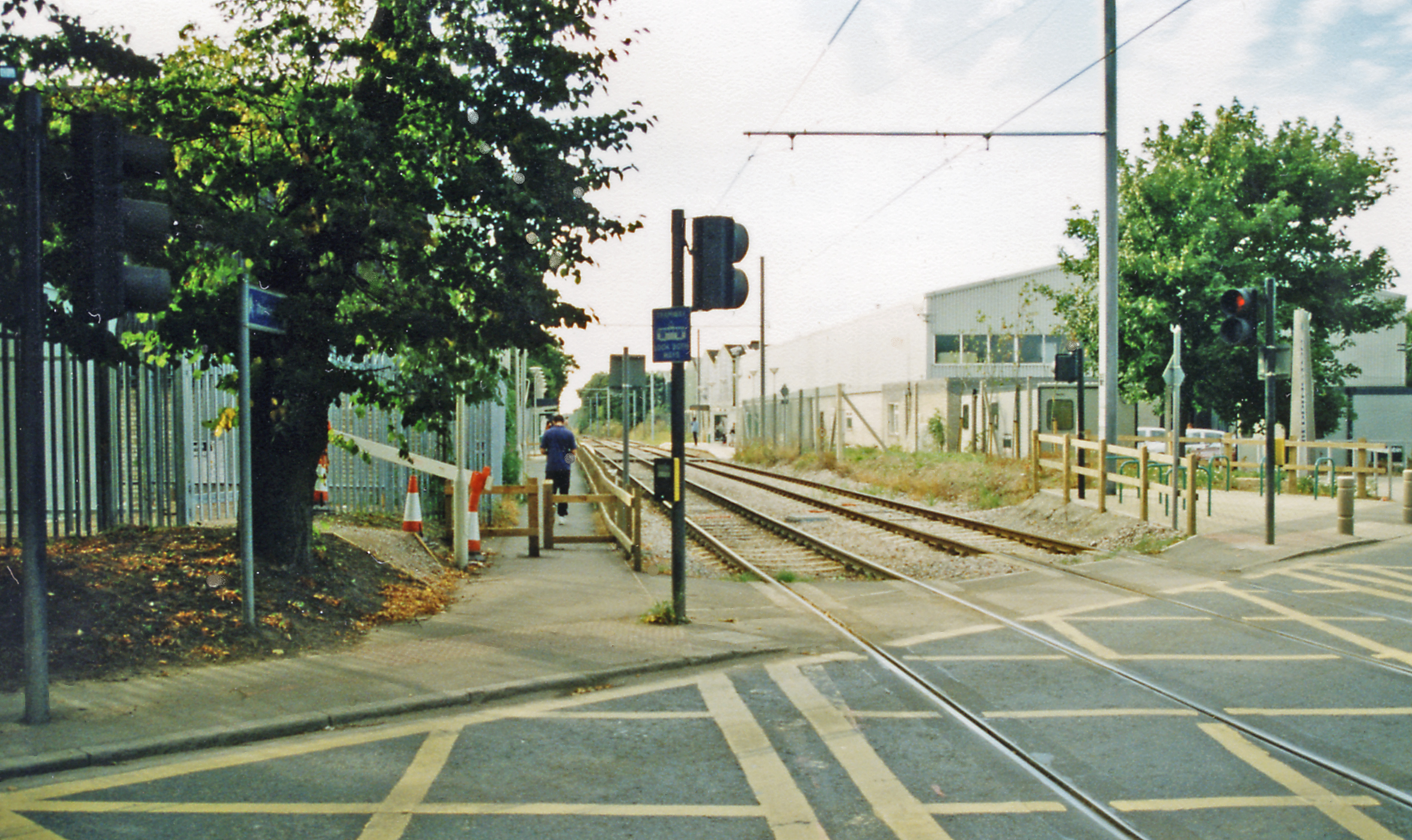
The tram stop

It is one of two Tramlink stops within the London Borough of Sutton, the other being Therapia Lane.

== Services ==
The typical off-peak service in trams per hour from Beddington Lane is:

- 6 tph in each direction between Beckenham Junction and Wimbledon
- 6 tph in each direction between Elmers End and Wimbledon

Services are operated using Bombardier CR4000 and Stadler Variobahn model low-floor trams.

Preceding station	Tramlink	Following station
Mitcham Junction towards Wimbledon	Tramlink; Wimbledon to Beckenham Junction	Therapia Lane towards Beckenham Junction
Mitcham Junction towards Wimbledon	Tramlink; Wimbledon to Elmers End	Therapia Lane towards Elmers End

== Connections ==
London Buses routes 463 and 633 serve the tram stop.

Free interchange for journeys made within an hour is available between trams and buses as part of Transport for London's Hopper Fare.
