= Mitcham Junction station =

Railway station and tram stop in Merton, London

Mitcham Junction
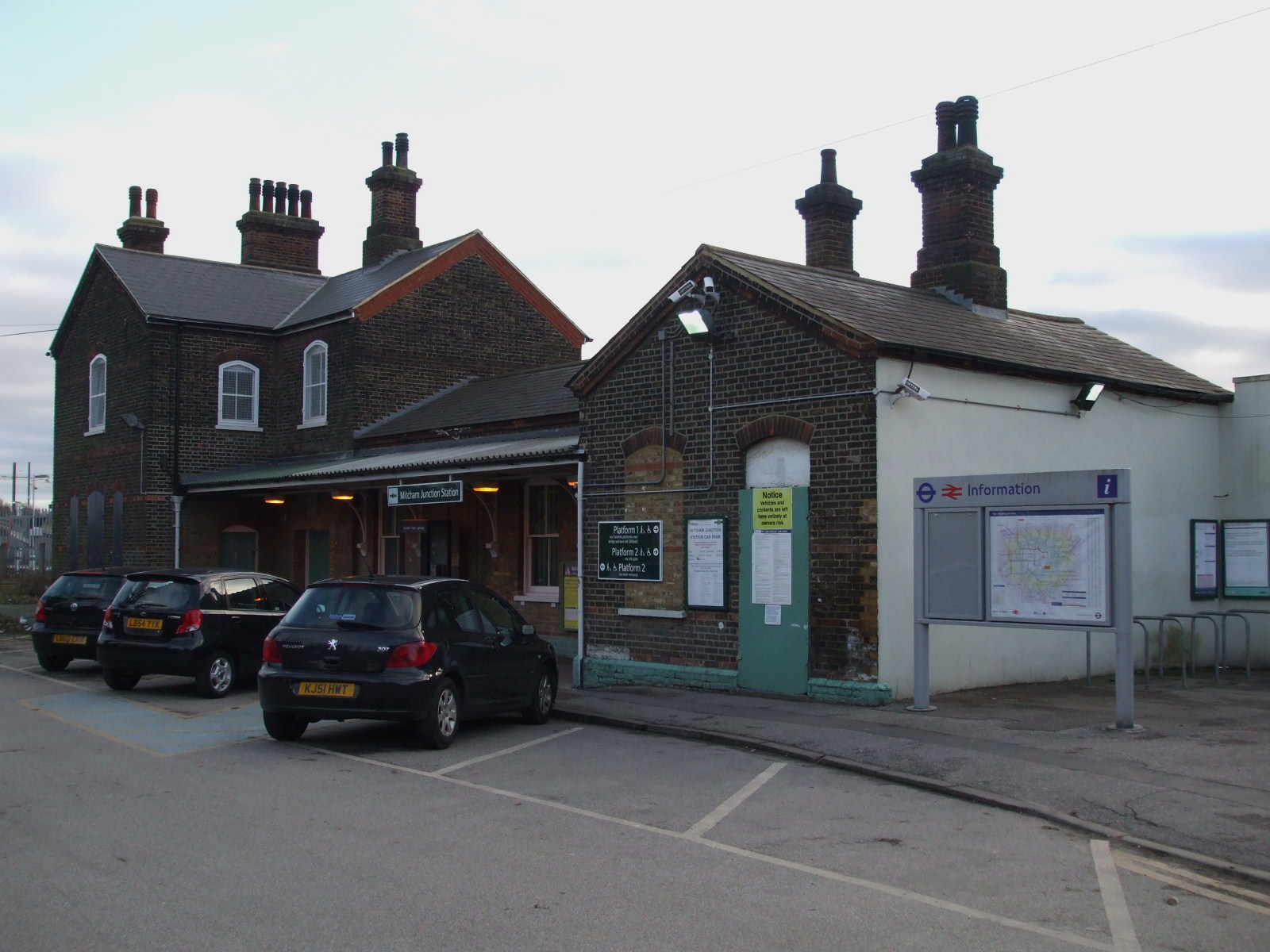
- Interactive map of Mitcham Junction

General information
- Location: Mitcham
- Local authority: London Borough of Merton
- Managed by: Southern
- Station code: MIJ
- DfT category: E
- Number of platforms: 4
- Accessible: Yes
- Fare zone: 4

National Rail annual entry and exit
- 2021–22: ▲0.324 million
- 2022–23: ▲0.350 million
- 2023–24: ▲0.379 million
- 2024–25: ▲0.408 million
- 2025–26: ▲0.437 million

Key dates
- 1 October 1868: Opened
- 3 March 1929: Electrified to Epsom
- 31 May 1997: West Croydon to Wimbledon Line Closed
- 30 May 2000: Tramlink opened

Other information
- External links: Departures; Facilities
- Coordinates: 51.393°N 0.1576°W

Mitcham Junction is a National Rail station served by Southern and Thameslink trains. It also has a Tramlink stop. It is in the London Borough of Merton and is in London fare zone 4.

The station opened on 1 October 1868 specifically to provide an interchange between the new "South London & Sutton Junction Railway", later re-branded as part of the Portsmouth Line, and the existing "Wimbledon & Croydon Railway".

Despite its name, Mitcham Junction is no longer a railway junction; one of the lines that crossed here (the W&CR) has become a grade-separated tramline, the Croydon Tramlink. Only the Portsmouth Line remains, used by services from Sutton and beyond to London Victoria, and from Sutton to London Blackfriars and beyond. The line still has sharp curves at either end of the station where the junctions were located and speed is limited to 30 miles per hour (48 km/h).

The platforms can accommodate 7 coaches. For longer trains, selective door opening is used.

== Location ==
Mitcham Junction is not near the centre of Mitcham but on Mitcham Common next to Mitcham Golf Club, and not far from the historic Cricket Green Conservation Area. The nearest railway station to the commercial centre of Mitcham is Mitcham Eastfields, between Mitcham Junction and Streatham, which opened in June 2008.

== Services ==
=== National Rail ===
National Rail services at Mitcham Junction are operated by Southern and Thameslink using Class 377 and 700 EMUs, respectively.

The typical off-peak service in trains per hour is:

- 2 tph to London Victoria
- 2 tph to St Albans City via Herne Hill
- 2 tph to Sutton
- 2 tph to Dorking of which 1 continues to Horsham

During the peak hours, additional services between London Victoria and Epsom also call at the station, as well as a single return journey between Sutton and London Bridge.

On Saturday evenings (after approximately 18:45) and on Sundays, there is no service south of Dorking to Horsham.

=== Tramlink ===
The typical off-peak service in trams per hour from Mitcham Junction is:

- 6 tph in each direction between Beckenham Junction and Wimbledon
- 6 tph in each direction between Elmers End and Wimbledon

Services are operated using Bombardier CR4000 and Stadler Variobahn model low-floor trams.

Preceding station	National Rail	Following station
Mitcham Eastfields	Southern Sutton & Mole Valley Lines	Hackbridge
Mitcham Eastfields	Thameslink Sutton & Mole Valley Lines	Hackbridge
Preceding station	Tramlink	Following station
Mitcham towards Wimbledon	Tramlink; Wimbledon to Beckenham Junction	Beddington Lane towards Beckenham Junction
Mitcham towards Wimbledon	Tramlink; Wimbledon to Elmers End	Beddington Lane towards Elmers End
Disused railways
Mitcham	Connex South Central West Croydon to Wimbledon Line	Beddington Lane

== Connections ==
London Buses routes 127 and S1 serve the station and tram stop.
