= BedZED =

Housing development in Hackbridge, London

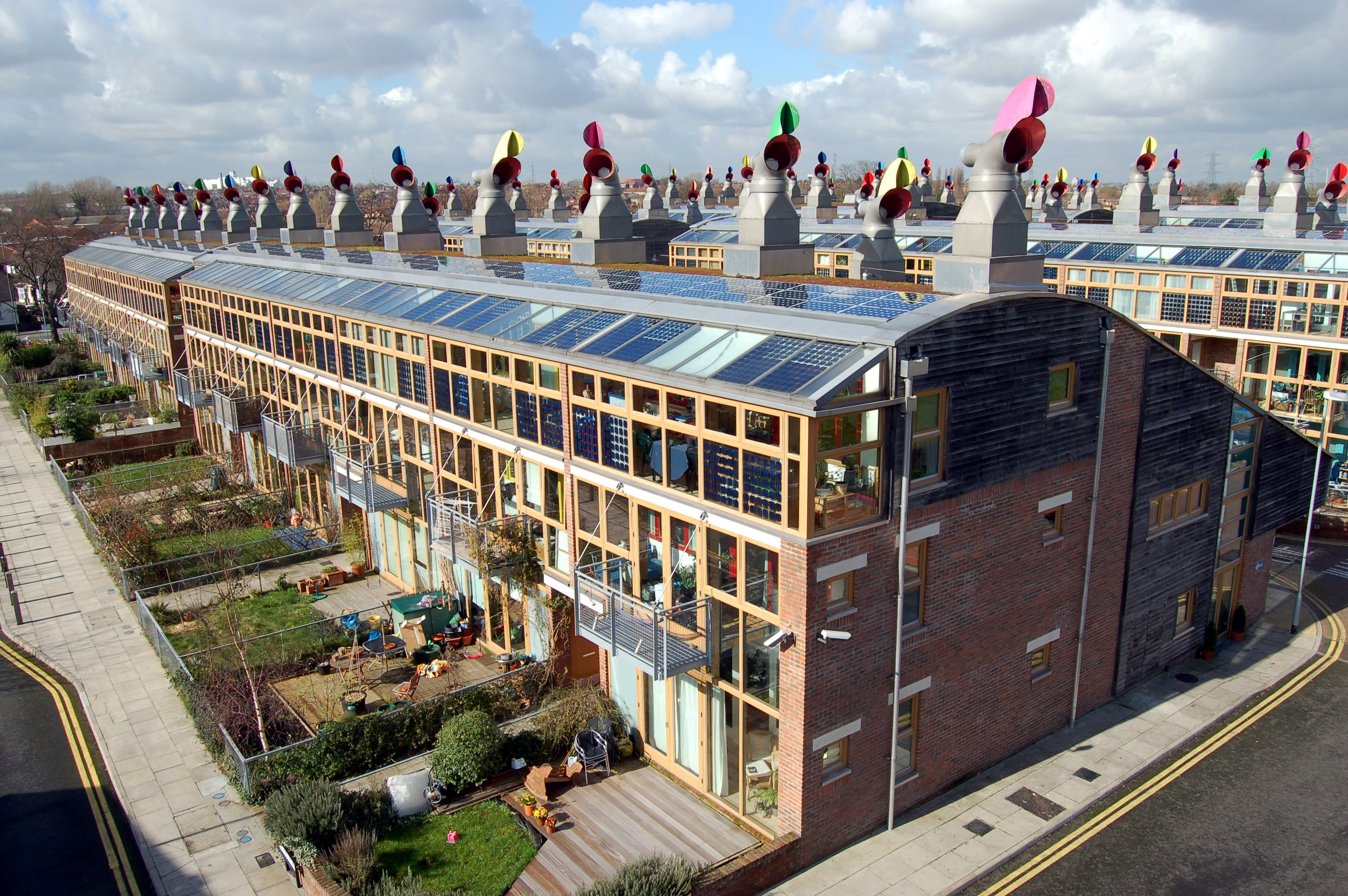
- BedZED Ecovillage
- Interactive map of BedZED

General information
- Location: Hackbridge, London Borough of Sutton
- Coordinates: 51°22′55.5″N 00°09′21.67″W
- Status: Environmentally friendly housing development

Construction
- Constructed: 2000–2002

Other information
- Governing body: Peabody Trust

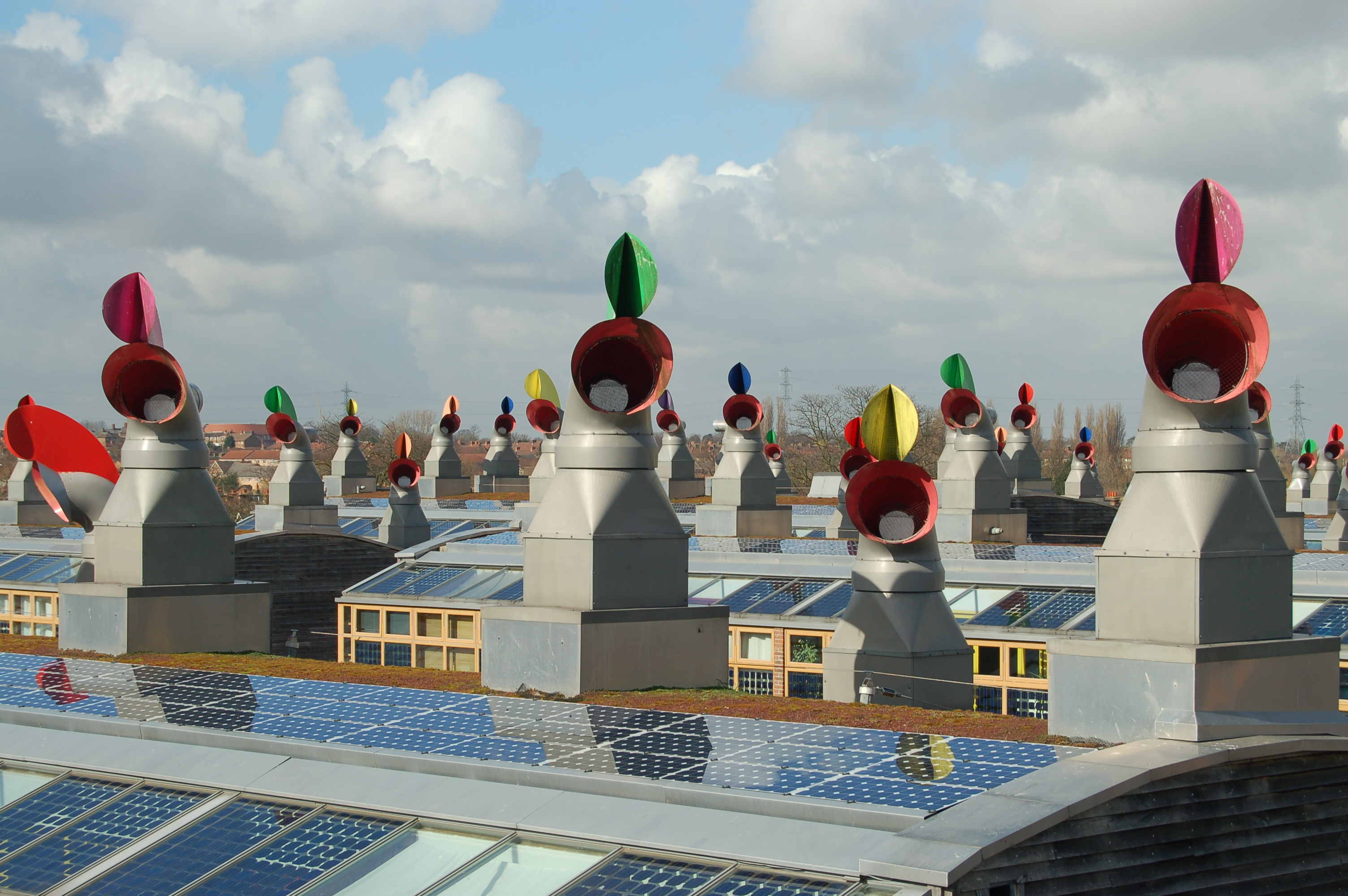
Roofs

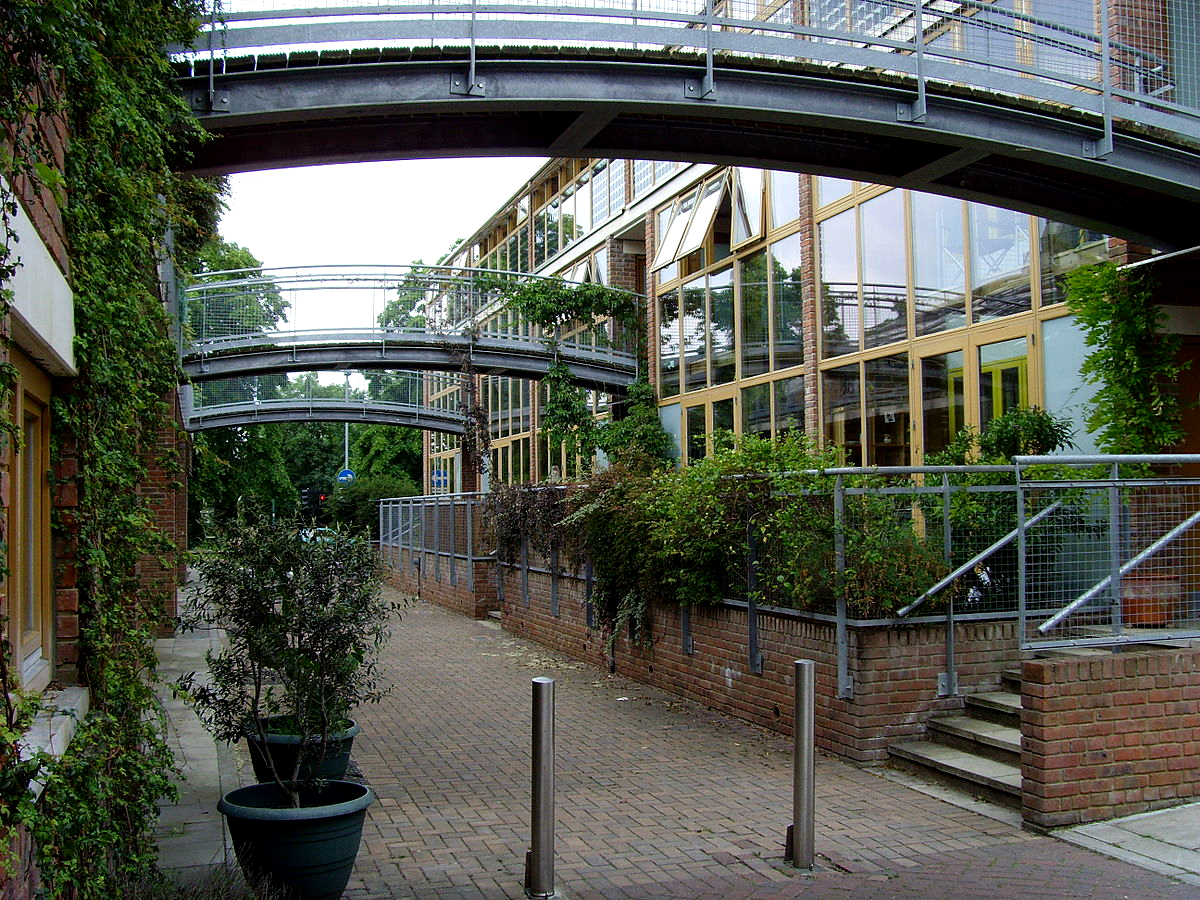
Street in BedZED

Beddington Zero Energy Development (BedZED) is an environmentally friendly housing development in Hackbridge, London, England. It is in the London Borough of Sutton, 2 miles (3 km) north-east of the town of Sutton itself. Designed to create zero carbon emissions, it was the first large scale community to do so.

== Background ==
BedZED was designed by the architect Bill Dunster to be carbon neutral. The project was led by the Peabody Trust in partnership with Bill Dunster Architects, Ellis & Moore Consulting Engineers, BioRegional, Arup and the cost consultants Gardiner and Theobald. The project was the first construction project where a local authority sold land at below market value to make sustainable development economically viable.

The 82 homes and 1,405 square metres (15,120 ft^{2}) of work space was built within the period of 2000–2002. The project was shortlisted for the Stirling Prize in 2003.

== Performance ==
Monitoring conducted in 2003 found that BedZED had achieved these reductions in comparison to UK averages:

- Space-heating requirements were 88% less.
- Hot-water consumption was 57% less.
- The electrical power used, at 3 kilowatt hours per person per day, was 25% less than the UK average; 11% of this was produced by solar panels. The remainder normally would be produced by a combined-heat-and-power plant fuelled by wood chips, but the installation company's financial problems have delayed use of the plant.
- Mains-water consumption was reduced by 50%, or 67% compared to a power-shower household.
- The residents' car mileage was 65% less.

== Problems ==
A review of the BedZed development in 2010 drew mainly positive conclusions: residents and neighbours were largely happy. However, a few significant failures were highlighted, for example:

- The biomass wood chip boiler (biomass gasifier) was no longer in operation and the backup power source, a gas boiler, was used from 2005–2017. The downdraft wood chip gasifier CHP (combined heat and power) had reliability problems due to technical problems and the intermittent schedule of operation (no late-night operation) imposed by the local authority. However, BedZED switched from gas back to a biomass pellet boiler in 2017 which provides heat for the district heating network but not electricity, which is now sourced from the grid on a green tariff. The biomass pellets are now sourced from Spain, not from local wood waste.
- The 'Living Machine' water recycling facility had been unable to clean the water sufficiently. The cost of the facility also made it unviable.
- Passive heating from the sunspaces had been insufficient.
- Because of its location, the development requires the constant use of cars by residents. This negates its fundamental raison d'être, other than as an interesting experiment.

The results show that the average ecological footprint of a BedZED resident is 4.67 global hectares (2.6 planets), which is 89% of the baseline. This would reduce to 4.32 global hectares (2.4 planets) if the energy was all zero carbon. However, a keen resident at BedZED (if the CHP was working) could achieve an ecological footprint of 3.0 global hectares (1.7 planets) which is 57% of the average. The target was 1 planet.

== Awards ==
- 2003 – RIBA journal sustainability award – the judges said "BedZED goes way beyond the standard environmental checklist by challenging both the way we live and work... Until now, pioneering communities have often been attained at the expense of architectural ambition but at BedZED the architects have been highly innovative."
- 2003 – Ashden Awards – for projects building on the experience of BedZED

== See also ==
- Passive solar building design
- BioRegional
