= Hackbridge railway station =

National Rail station in London, England

Hackbridge
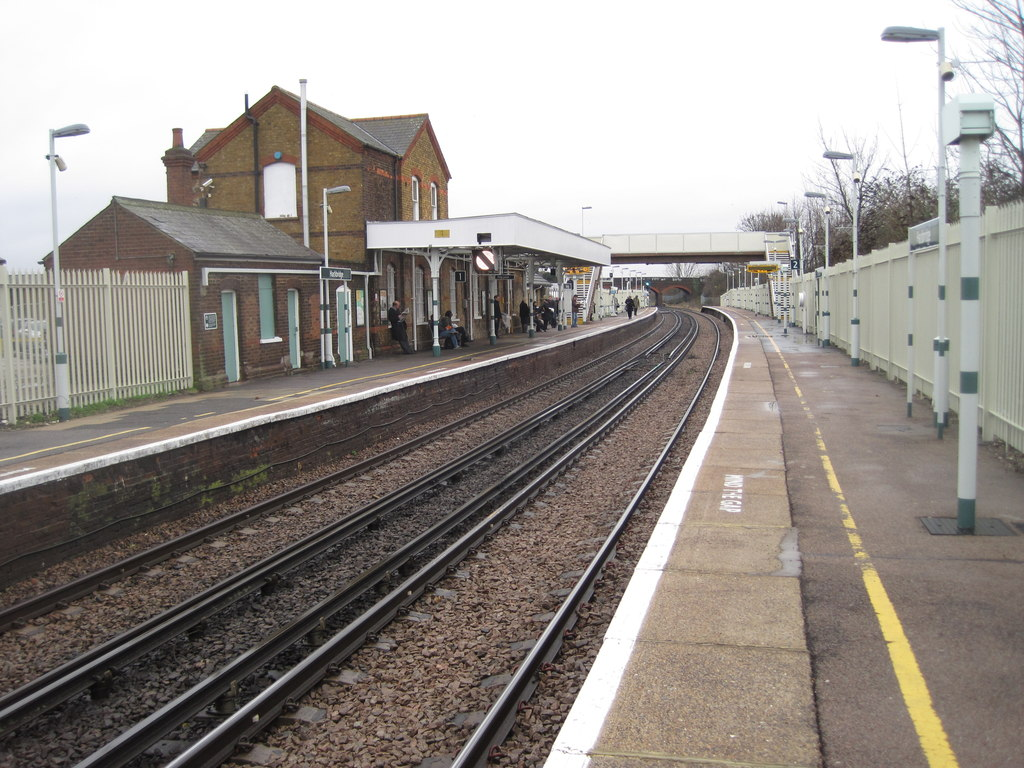
- Interactive map of Hackbridge

General information
- Location: Hackbridge
- Local authority: London Borough of Sutton
- Managed by: Southern
- Station code: HCB
- DfT category: E
- Number of platforms: 2
- Accessible: Yes
- Fare zone: 4

National Rail annual entry and exit
- 2021–22: ▲0.566 million
- 2022–23: ▲0.722 million
- 2023–24: ▲0.845 million
- 2024–25: ▲0.911 million
- 2025–26: ▲0.951 million

Key dates
- 1 October 1868: Opened
- 3 March 1929: Electrified

Other information
- External links: Departures; Facilities
- Coordinates: 51.3778°N 0.1539°W

Hackbridge railway station is a railway station at Hackbridge in the London Borough of Sutton in South London. The station is served by Southern and Thameslink. It is in London fare zone 4.

The station platforms can accommodate up to 7 coaches. Where trains are longer than this, selective door opening is used.

== Services ==
Services at Hackbridge are operated by Southern and Thameslink using Class 377 and 700 EMUs.

The typical off-peak service in trains per hour is:

- 2 tph to London Victoria
- 2 tph to St Albans City via Herne Hill
- 2 tph to Sutton
- 2 tph to Dorking of which 1 continues to Horsham

During the peak hours, additional services between London Victoria and Epsom also call at the station, as well as a single return journey between Sutton and London Bridge.

On Saturday evenings (after approximately 18:45) and on Sundays, there is no service south of Dorking to Horsham.

Preceding station	National Rail	Following station
Mitcham Junction	Southern Sutton & Mole Valley Lines	Carshalton
Mitcham Junction	Thameslink Sutton & Mole Valley Lines	Carshalton

== Connections ==
London Buses routes 151 and 127 serve the station.
