= Leatherhead railway station =

Railway station in Surrey, England

Leatherhead
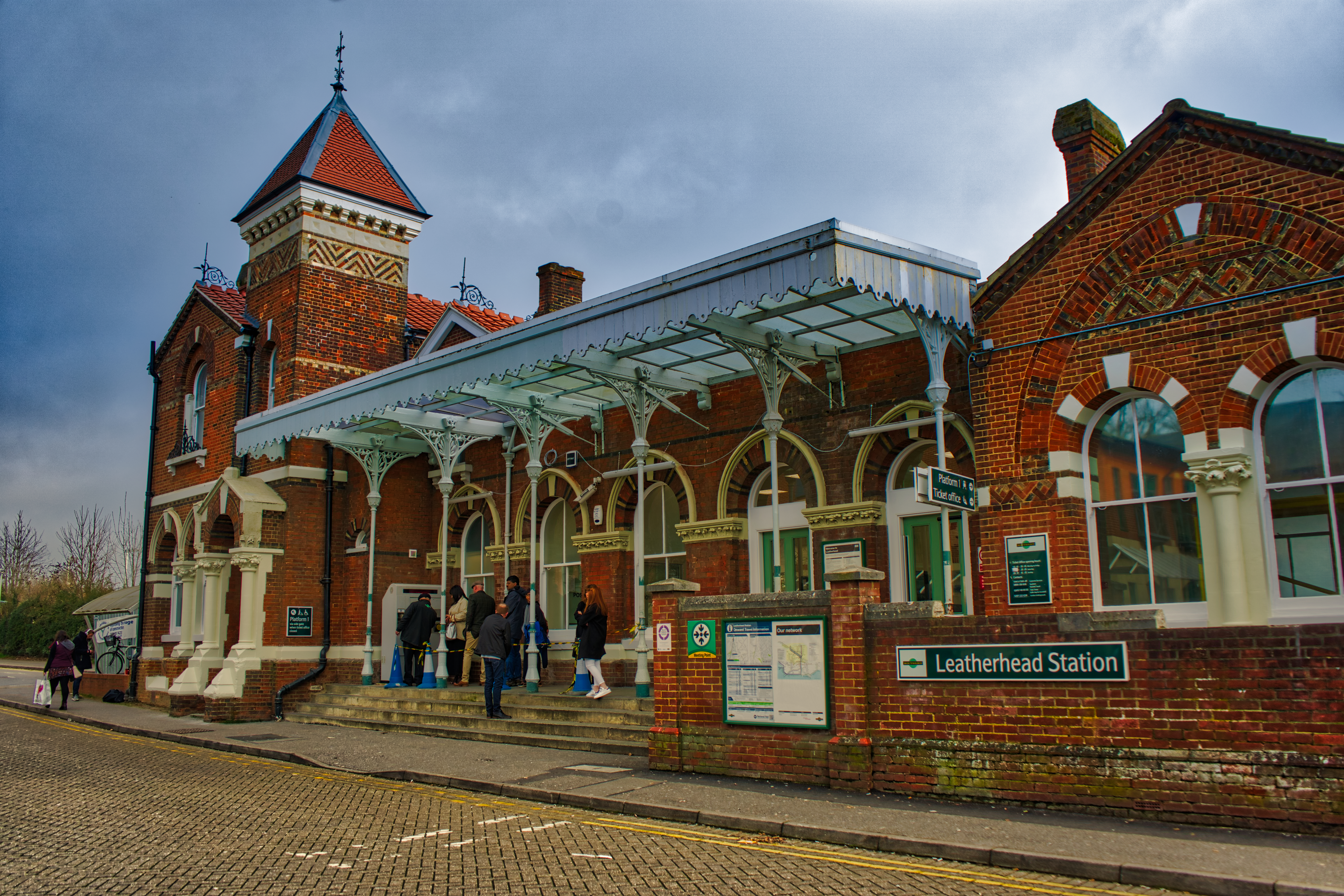
- The entrance to Leatherhead railway station

General information
- Location: Leatherhead, District of Mole Valley; England
- Coordinates: 51.299°N 0.333°W
- Grid reference: TQ163568
- Managed by: Southern
- Platforms: 2

Other information
- Station code: LHD
- Classification: DfT category C2

History
- Original company: London, Brighton and South Coast Railway
- Pre-grouping: London, Brighton and South Coast Railway
- Post-grouping: Southern Railway

Key dates
- 1 February 1859: First station opened by E&LR
- 4 March 1867: LBSCR station opened
- 1885: LSWR station opened
- 1927: LSWR station closed

Passengers
- 2020/21: ▼0.382 million
- Interchange: ▼8,378
- 2021/22: ▲0.929 million
- Interchange: ▲19,938
- 2022/23: ▲1.185 million
- Interchange: ▼15,946
- 2023/24: ▲1.374 million
- Interchange: ▼13,976
- 2024/25: ▲1.481 million
- Interchange: ▼12,718
Location
Notes
- Passenger statistics from the Office of Rail and Road

Leatherhead railway station is in Leatherhead, Surrey, England. It is managed by Southern, with services provided by them and South Western Railway. It is 18 miles 2 chains (29 km) from London Waterloo.

Two train operating companies serve the station due to its location at the junction of the Victoria or London Bridge – Horsham via Dorking line and the Waterloo – Guildford line via Wimbledon, Leatherhead and Effingham Junction on the New Guildford Line. (Note: The Horsham line rejoins the Brighton Main Line-cum-Arun Valley Line at Horsham and at Balham in London; the New Guildford via Epsom line rejoins its via Cobham route at Effingham Junction and at Raynes Park in London) Both are secondary routes to the major towns. The two lines were originally constructed and owned by separate railway companies. From 1923 until 1948 they were under the same ownership as part of the Southern Railway. Following nationalisation in 1948 the routes were operated as part of British Railways until 1996.

== History ==
In 1847 the London, Brighton and South Coast Railway (LBSCR) Company opened a line from West Croydon via Sutton and Cheam to Epsom (the Croydon and Epsom Railway). The London and South Western Railway (LSWR) Company supported a proposed Wimbledon and Dorking Railway (WDR), which proposed connecting the named towns via Epsom, partly as the company wanted a share of the lucrative Epsom race traffic. In 1857, before the scheme could be approved, the independent Epsom and Leatherhead Railway (ELR) was incorporated, pre-empting the central part of the WDR route. The ELR opened on 1 February 1859, initially consisting of an isolated single-track line from Epsom to Leatherhead with an intermediate station at Ashtead. When the truncated northern part of the WDR from Wimbledon to Epsom opened on 4 April 1859 it connected end-on to the ELR at their Epsom station.

The LBSCR connected to the ELR in 1859 by extending from their existing Epsom terminus, which was renamed "Epsom Town". The junction was at the north end of the ELR's station. The LBSCR did not have access to the platforms of this station, which were used exclusively by LSWR services. A year after opening, the ELR was acquired by the LSWR, but operated by a Joint Committee of the LSWR and LBSCR.

In 1863 the company was vested jointly in the LSWR and LBSCR by Act of Parliament. Initially the companies shared the stations at Ashtead and Leatherhead, but maintained separate stations at Epsom.

In 1867 the LBSCR-promoted Horsham, Dorking and Leatherhead Railway was opened from Leatherhead via Dorking to Horsham on the Mid-Sussex Line. The LBSCR built a new, separate station to serve Leatherhead located some 700m to the south of the former joint station. A fine 4 arch viaduct was constructed across the River Mole, carrying the line to Dorking. It is Grade II listed.

The original ELR station continued to be used by the LSWR until 2 February 1885, when a new station located further south and to the south west of the LBSCR station was opened. The new LSWR station was a single-storey brick-built structure in a neo-classical Italianate style, typical of the company's designs of the 1880s. The LSWR also constructed a two-road engine shed and turntable at its station's southern end, south of Station Road above the River Mole. It replaced a smaller structure that lay to the north of Kingston Road and served the original ELR station. The original engine shed survived until the 1980s. For many years through the 1970s and 80s it was used as a workshop by Ryebrook Motors.

The LSWR constructed an extension from Leatherhead to join the New Guildford Line (from Surbiton via Cobham to Guildford) at Effingham Junction running via Bookham. It opened on 2 February 1885. A curving five-arch viaduct was built to cross the River Mole just to the south west of the station and north of the engine shed.

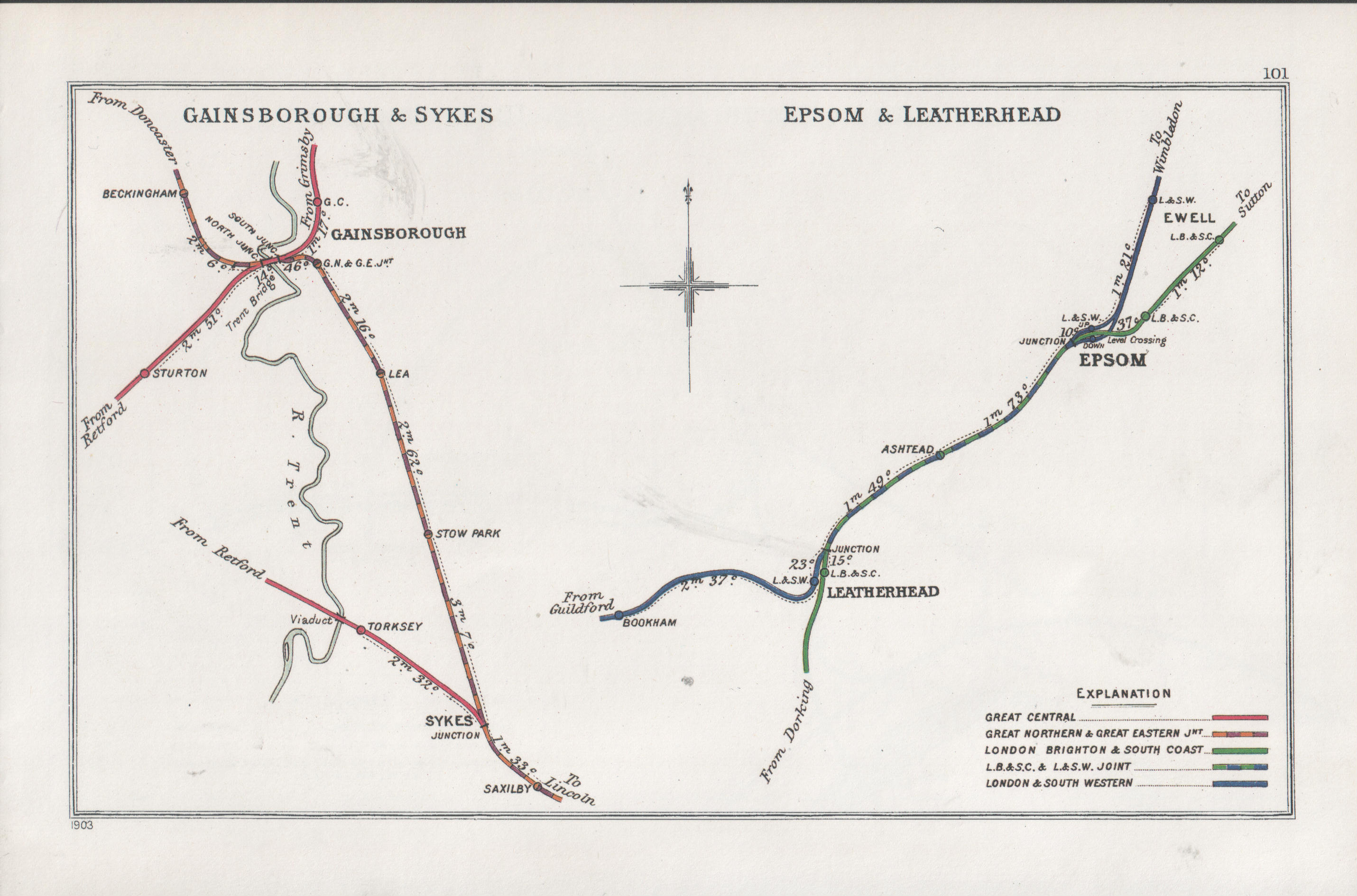
Extract from a 1903 Railway Clearing House Junction Diagram showing railways in the vicinity of Leatherhead (current station is marked L.B.&S.C.)

Under the grouping of 1923, the LBSCR and LSWR became part of the Southern Railway. The lines through Leatherhead were electrified in 1925, third rail services starting between Waterloo and Dorking (North) and Bookham and the Guildford New Line on 12 July.

The duplication of stations serving the town ended in 1927 when the line from Guildford was diverted to join the LBSCR line to the south of the LBSCR station, entailing the construction of a new bridge across Station Road. The LBSCR station continues to serve all trains today.

The LSWR station was closed, with all trains using the LBSCR station, from 10 July 1927.) The engine shed and facilities were closed and demolished. The LSWR station's running lines were used for EMU/carriage berthing until the mid 1970s. The station buildings gradually fell into disrepair. The use of the truncated running lines as sidings ceased, and the tracks were finally removed in the 1980s. The station buildings on the up line were demolished and offices built on the site and part of the approach road. Part of the covered steps up from road level to down platform level remain in a derelict state (2020).

The LBSCR stationmaster's house, an integral part of the main up side buildings, is now in use as the archive and library of The Railway Correspondence & Travel Society.

In the 1930s, it was planned to build a new loop line from Motspur Park on the LSWR Raynes Park – Leatherhead line. The branch opened on 29 May 1938 from Motspur Park to Tolworth, with an intermediate station at Malden Manor, and to Chessington North and Chessington South on 28 May 1939. However the outbreak of World War II halted construction. The establishment of the Metropolitan Green Belt around London, first proposed by the Greater London Regional Planning Committee in 1935, and the subsequent designation of Ashtead Common as a Site of Special Scientific Interest in 1955, led to the abandonment of the line's extension. It continues to operate to Chessington South as the Chessington Branch Line. Parliamentary powers for the Chessington South – Leatherhead line lapsed in 1962. Land through North Leatherhead reserved for the railway was subsequently used for a small section of route of the M25 motorway and its junction with the A243.

Ticket barriers were installed in 2011.

== Architecture ==
The present station is a Grade II listed building. It was designed by Charles Driver in a Neo-Romanesque style and constructed in red brick with stone and polychrome brick dressings, and red tile roofs. The up side range of buildings includes the station master's house with Italianate tower, ticket office and booking hall. The down side buildings include waiting rooms, goods rooms and an extensive screen wall. A passenger subway links the two ranges of buildings.

== Services ==
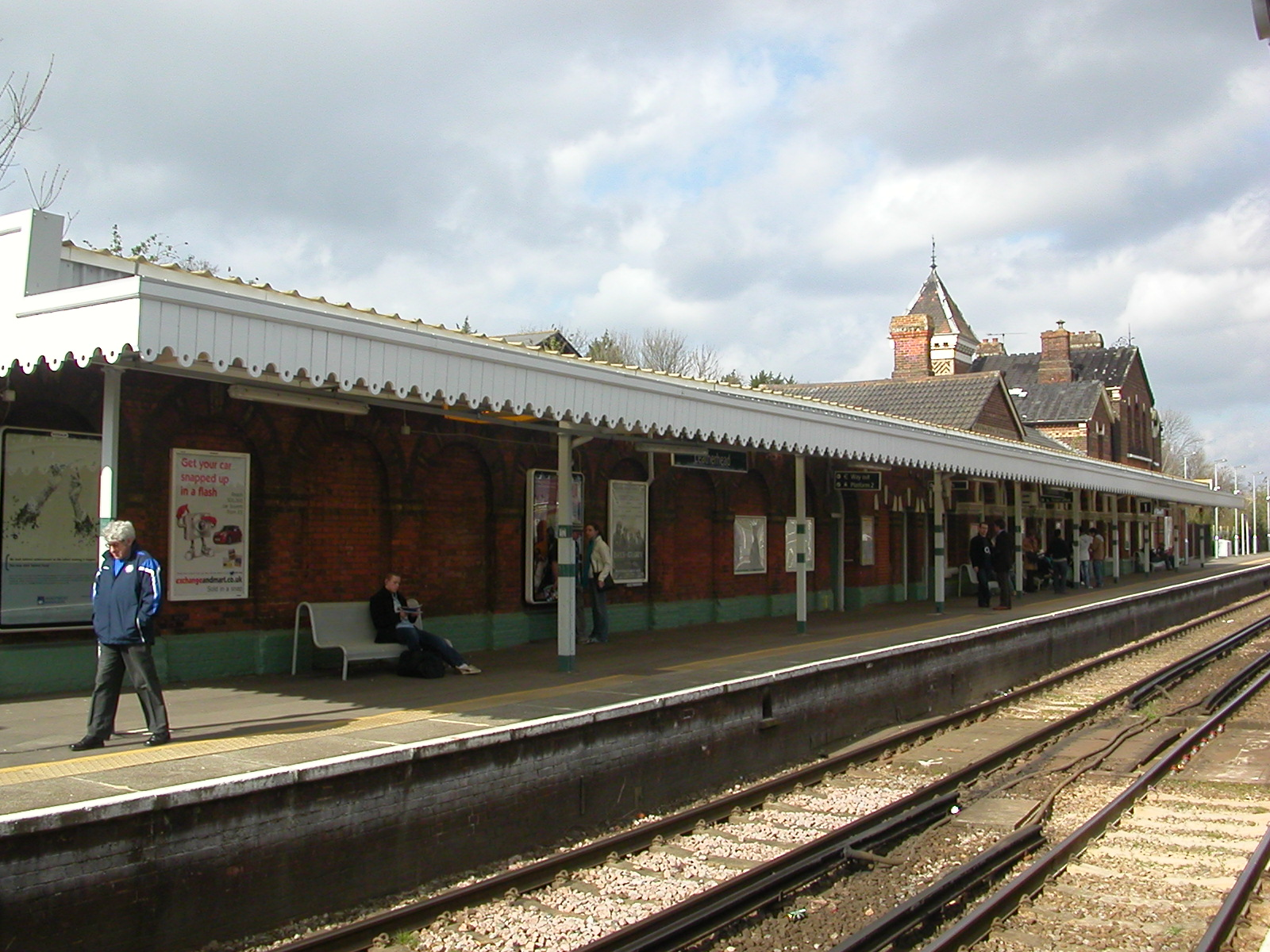
Up platform buildings.

The typical off-peak service in trains per hour is:

- 2 tph to London Victoria via Sutton and Mitcham Junction
- 2 tph to London Waterloo via Wimbledon
- 3 tph to Dorking of which 1 continues to Horsham
- 1 tph to Guildford

On Saturday evenings (after approximately 18:45) and on Sundays, there is no service south of Dorking to Horsham.

Preceding station	National Rail	Following station
Ashtead	Southern Sutton & Mole Valley Lines	Box Hill & Westhumble or Dorking
Ashtead	South Western Railway Mole Valley Line	Box Hill & Westhumble
Ashtead	South Western Railway Mole Valley Line	Bookham
	Disused railways	
Effingham Junction	Network SouthEast Thameslink	Epsom

== Connections ==
London Buses route 465 and Falcon Buses routes 408 and 479 serve the station.
