= Portsmouth line =

Railway line in London, United Kingdom

Portsmouth Line

Overview
- Status: Operational
- Owner: LBSCR/LSWR; Southern Railway; British Railways; Network Rail
- Locale: Greater London; Surrey; West Sussex
- Termini: Peckham Rye; Horsham

Service
- Type: Heavy rail
- System: National Rail
- Operator(s): South Western Railway; Southern; Thameslink

History
- Commenced: 1847
- Completed: 1868

Technical
- Track gauge: 1,435 mm (4 ft 8 1/2 in) standard gauge
- Electrification: 750 V DC third rail

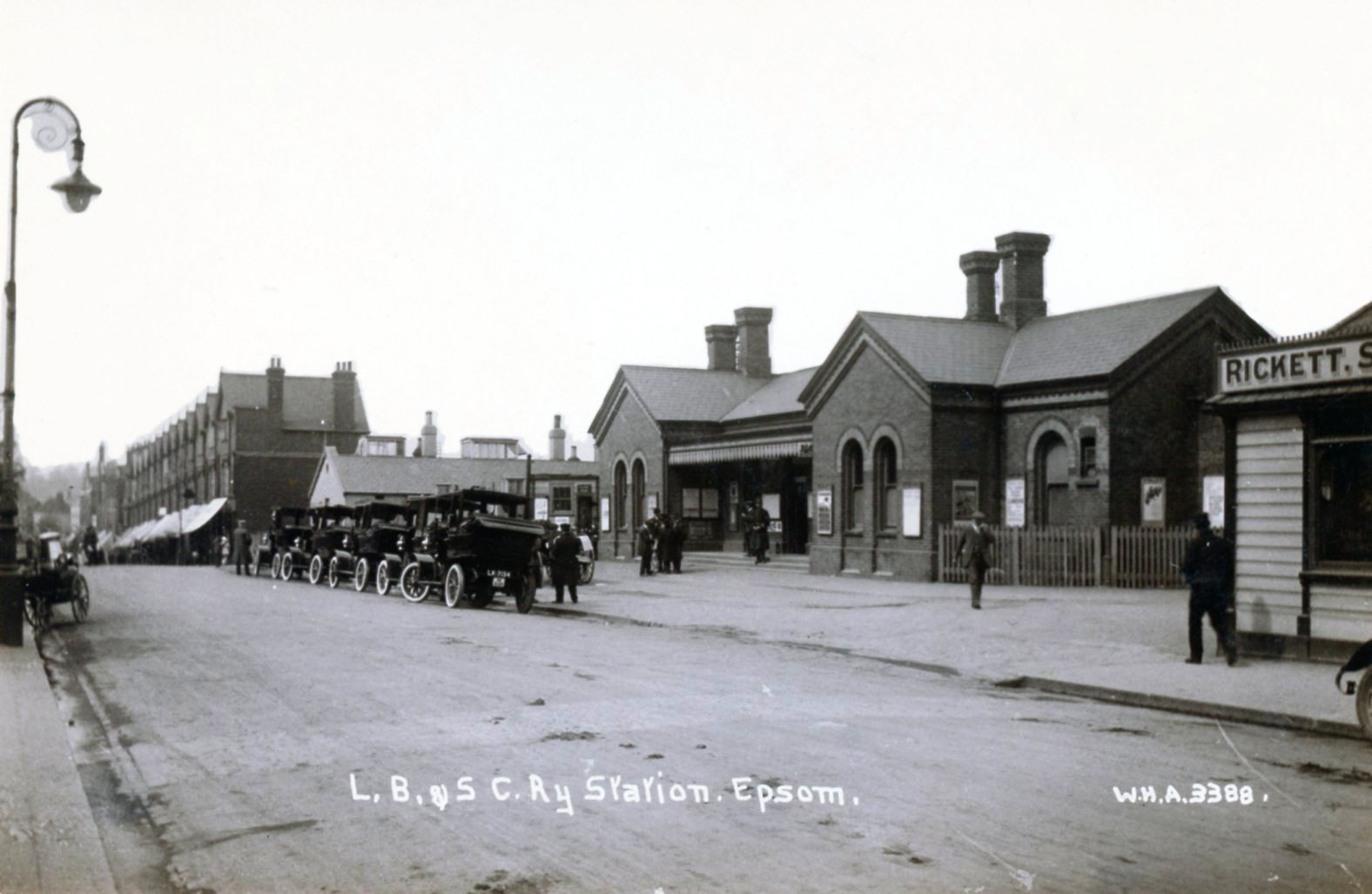
Epsom Town station, pre-Grouping

The Portsmouth line is a secondary main line originally built by the London, Brighton and South Coast Railway and the London and South Western Railway between 1847 and 1868. It leaves the South London Line (Atlantic Lines) at Peckham Rye, with connections to the Victoria branch of the Brighton Main Line at Streatham, and continues via Sutton, Epsom and Dorking to join the Mid-Sussex Line (Note: Also known as the "Arun Valley Line", although that name is sometimes used only for the section from Horsham to Arundel, the actual Arun valley.) at Horsham.

As of 2022, the line is predominantly a commuter line and there are no scheduled services running along the entire route. The current service pattern can be divided into three sections. The first of these runs from Peckham Rye to Streatham (Southern), with trains then switching on to the Brighton Main Line towards Selhurst and Caterham; the second is the Streatham to Sutton section (Thameslink), part of the Sutton Loop Line, and the third runs from Sutton to Horsham (Southern), with trains originating from London Victoria and joining the Portsmouth line south of Streatham.

== Names ==
The Portsmouth line refers to the preferred route from London to Portsmouth on the former LB&SCR system, and particularly the cutoff from Peckham Rye to Horsham. It is not generally applied north of Peckham Rye or south of Horsham because those lines have well-known identities established before the Portsmouth connection was completed: the South London Line, the Mid-Sussex Line and the West Coastway Line.

For a time passenger services on the Portsmouth line and some associated branches were timetabled and marketed as the Sutton & Mole Valley Lines. Since 2007 that name no longer appears in Southern or National Rail publications.

The Portsmouth Line should not be confused with the Portsmouth Direct Line (originally called the "Direct Portsmouth Railway"). The Portsmouth Direct, before the Grouping part of the LSWR system, (Note: The DPR was built speculatively by the contractor Thomas Brassey then acquired by the LSWR.) has been the primary route from London to Portsmouth since it opened. It leaves the South West Main Line at Woking and runs via Guildford to Havant. From Havant to Portsmouth Harbour it shares the LBSCR route.

From Portcreek Junction to Portsmouth the route was owned and operated jointly by the LBSCR and LSWR, and that section is known as the Portsmouth Joint Line. (Note: From 1880 also including a line from Ryde St John's Road to Ryde Pier Head on the Isle of Wight, linked to Portsmouth Harbour by a ferry service.)

== History ==
Early railways to Portsmouth were far from direct. In 1841 the LSWR opened a branch from Eastleigh (on the London-Southampton main line) to Gosport, with a ferry across the harbour to Portsmouth. By 1847 the LBSCR had extended its West Coastway Line from Chichester to Portsmouth Town, with trains from Brighton, and from London Bridge with a reversal (or change) at Brighton. (Note: The Cliftonville Curve, which allows direct access from the Brighton Main Line to the West Coastway at Hove, was not opened until 1879.) In 1848 the LSWR opened a branch from Fareham on the Gosport line to join the LBSCR at Portcreek Junction, and negotiated with the LBSCR for joint ownership of the line to the Portsmouth terminus. Surprisingly over such a distance the two routes from London were almost identical in length, the Brighton route being shorter by just 51 chains (94m 43ch from London Bridge via Brighton, vs. 95m 14ch from Waterloo via Eastleigh). (Note: From Waterloo only after 10 October 1848. For the 3 months from the opening of the Fareham-Cosham line until the Nine Elms-Waterloo viaduct opened the LSWR route had been shorter by 1m19ch (93m 75ch from Nine Elms).)

Portsmouth Town station, from the Illustrated London News, 1882

For a decade these remained the only lines into Portsmouth. The people of Portsmouth and particularly the Admiralty thought such roundabout routes were unsatisfactory for a major naval base, especially when the rival port of Southampton, and Brighton, a mere seaside resort, were served by fast direct lines from London. Various schemes were proposed for shorter lines, including routes via Horsham and via the Wey Valley. The eventual winner was the Direct Portsmouth Railway, authorised in 1853 and opened in 1858. This extended the LSWR Godalming branch to meet the LBSCR West Coastway at Havant. It was operated and later acquired by the LSWR, and quickly became the most popular route to Portsmouth, despite initial obstructive tactics by the LBSCR at Havant.

This put the LBSCR at a disadvantage, but over the following decade they developed a number of lines in Surrey and West Sussex that substantially improved their Portsmouth service.

Thus the route that eventually became the Portsmouth Line was built in stages over an extended period:

=== Along The North Downs ===
==== Arrival at Epsom ====
Sutton and Epsom were first reached by an extension of the London and Croydon Railway (L&CR) from West Croydon. This was promoted by the L&CR as an independent company, the Croydon and Epsom Railway (C&ER), and was originally proposed to be an atmospheric railway.

In 1846 the C&ER merged with the L&CR, the London & Brighton Railway and others to form the LBSCR, and in 1847 the Croydon and Epsom route was completed as a conventional locomotive-hauled line under LBSCR auspices. It ran via Wallington, Sutton, Cheam and Ewell to an Epsom station on the east side of town.

==== Extending to Leatherhead ====
Twelve years later the independent Epsom and Leatherhead Railway (ELR) built a line from a new station on the west side of Epsom to Leatherhead, opening in February 1859 as a single line with just one intermediate station, at Ashtead. The LSWR-promoted Wimbledon and Dorking Railway connected end-on at Epsom, opening in April 1859. On 8 Aug 1859 the LBSCR opened an extension from its existing Epsom station to the ELR. Within a year the ELR was jointly acquired by the LSWR and LBSCR.

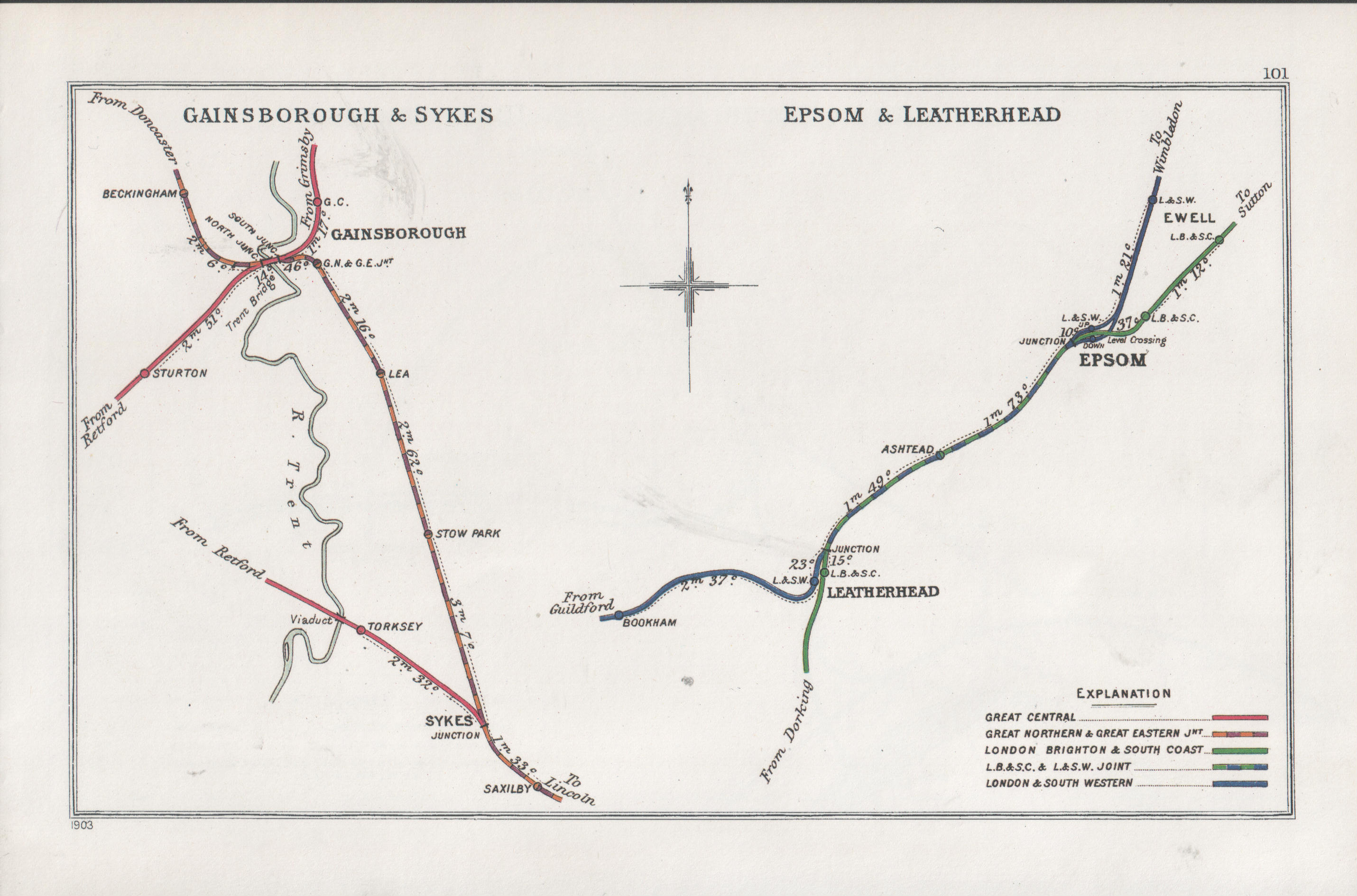
The original Epsom and Leatherhead junctions (after the opening of the Bookham Branch) with separate LBSCR and LSWR stations in both towns.

=== Avoiding Brighton ===
==== Horsham and The Arun Valley ====
A single-line branch from the Brighton Main Line at Three Bridges to Horsham, later known as the Mid-Sussex Line, had opened in 1848. It was extended down the Arun Valley to Petworth via Pulborough in 1859 (eventually reaching Midhurst in 1866). In 1862 it was doubled throughout, and the following year it was extended from Hardham Junction, south of Pulborough, to Arundel Junction on the West Coastway Line. This, in 1863, gave the LBSCR a more direct path from London to Chichester and Portsmouth than the long detour via Brighton, although it followed two-thirds of the Brighton Main Line before turning cross-country.

==== The Mole Valley: Leatherhead to Horsham ====
In 1862 the Horsham, Dorking and Leatherhead Railway (HDLR) was authorised to provide a link from the Mid-Sussex Line at Horsham to Leatherhead, crossing the North Downs via the Mole Valley between Dorking and Leatherhead. The line connected to the ELR just east of the existing Leatherhead station, which became a terminus used by LSWR services only. The HDLR provided a new through station just across the road, the one still in use today. At Dorking there was a south-to-west spur to the South Eastern Railway's Reading, Guildford and Reigate Railway, but this was never used for regular services.

When the HDLR opened in 1867 it created an LBSCR route to Portsmouth that avoided much of the busy Brighton Main Line, although it was actually longer than the Mid-Sussex/Arun Valley route, (Note: 88m 31ch from Victoria to Portsmouth Town via West Croydon and Sutton, against 85m 45ch via Three Bridges) and still used the congested lines through Norwood Junction and Selhurst.

=== The Sutton cutoff ===
So far the LBSCR route to Epsom and beyond had been via the Wallington (West Croydon to Sutton) line but in 1868, only a year after the Horsham to Leatherhead connection, they opened a line from Peckham Rye to Sutton via Tulse Hill and Mitcham Junction. Although it primarily filled gaps in the LBSCR suburban network it also improved the route to Portsmouth, being slightly shorter than via Wallington, (Note: Victoria to Portsmouth Town was now 85m 26ch, the shortest ever route on the LBSCR, but still far longer than the Portsmouth Direct at 73m 38ch from Waterloo.) and bypassed the bottlenecks at Norwood Junction and Selhurst; so it was promoted as a new "Portsmouth Line".

Contemporary maps label it the "South London & Sutton Junction Railway" suggesting that, as with other sections of the Portsmouth Line, this part may initially have been vested in an independent company to insulate the LBSCR from financial problems; although there is no evidence that they used such a vehicle for either construction or operation of the line.

==== Connections ====
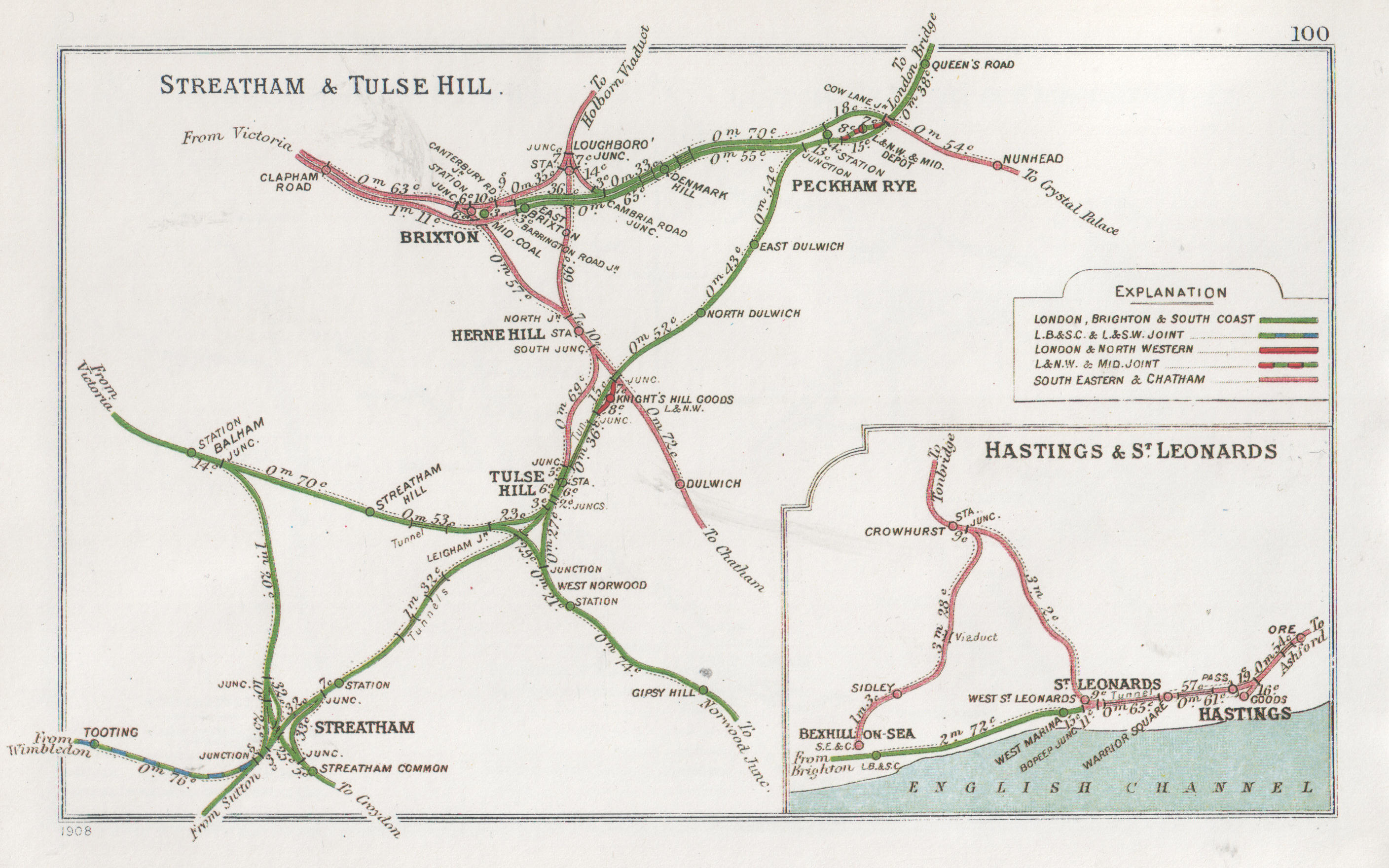
Peckham Rye, Tulse Hill and Streatham Junctions in 1914

On opening in 1868 the Sutton line had many links, all but one to other LBSCR lines:

- A branch from the Chatham Main Line (LCDR) at Herne Hill to Tulse Hill
- Chords from Tulse Hill up to the Crystal Palace Line in both directions
- The Brighton Main Line junctions at Streatham:
  - a double-track SW to SE chord from Streatham (Streatham Junction) down to the Slow Lines at Streatham Common
  - a double-track flying junction SE to SW from the Slow Lines (Streatham North Junction) to the Portsmouth (Streatham South Junction)
  - a separate single-track chord with crossovers up from the Fast Lines
- The Wimbledon Loop branching off west at Streatham South Junction
- Crossing the Wimbledon and Croydon Railway at Mitcham Junction, a new station created specifically for this interchange
- At Sutton the line from West Croydon via Wallington joins in a trailing direction, and the Epsom Downs Branch turns away to the south

==== Engineering ====
The section from Peckham Rye to Streatham passes through the grounds of Dulwich College and relatively hilly terrain, which required some costly engineering works:

- A brick-lined cutting leading to North Dulwich station
- An ornate brick-arch viaduct through the College grounds, with several cast-iron road overbridges
- Knights Hill Tunnel
- Leigham Tunnel
- Streatham Tunnel

The arches of the viaduct and the south portal of Knight's Hill Tunnel are adorned with the monogram "AC", in tribute to the landowner Alleyn's College, as Dulwich College was known at the time the line was built.

Mitcham Junction station is approached from both directions by severe curves that turn the Portsmouth Line through 90-degrees to join the alignment of the Wimbledon-Croydon line (running NW-SE), then back to resume its broadly SW alignment. (Note: The curves on the Portsmouth Line remain, but in 1997 the Wimbledon-Croydon tracks were converted to a grade-separated tram line, with a flyover crossing the Portsmouth Line south of Mitcham Junction.)

=== Later Connections ===
Inside the LSWR Leatherhead station, when it was a through station on the Bookham branch

In 1885 the LSWR opened the New Guildford Line from Surbiton to Guildford via Cobham. This included a branch from Effingham Junction (Note: At this stage just a junction in the Guildford direction; Effingham Junction station was not opened until 1888.) via Bookham to the Portsmouth Line at Leatherhead. This turned the old LSWR terminal at Leatherhead into a through station, and enabled a "Guildford via Epsom" service which continues to this day.

After the Grouping, in 1927 the Southern Railway diverted the Bookham line to join the HDLR to the west of the LBSCR station, which then became the only Leatherhead station. A stump of the original ELR/LSWR line was retained for carriage sidings.

Also in 1927 the Southern Railway completely rebuilt Epsom LSWR station and layout to give the LBSCR (Sutton) line access to the platforms. Epsom Town was closed to passengers in 1929, and became the main goods station for the area, relieving the cramped yard at Epsom (LSWR).

One of the last new lines to be built in Britain before the HS1 era was the Wimbledon and Sutton Railway (W&SR), from Wimbledon through Merton and Morden, to join the Portsmouth Line in the up direction south of Sutton. Construction began in 1927 (Note: Proposals for the W&SR had been around since 1910, but the Great War and then the Grouping delayed implementation for 17 years.) and was completed in 1930. The Wimbledon & Sutton line is now part of a circular route from Streatham, via the Portsmouth Line to Sutton, the W&SR to Wimbledon, then the Wimbledon Loop (northern branch) back to Streatham.

== Technical information ==
=== Tunnels ===
There are five tunnels, built between 1860 and 1867:

Knight's Hill Tunnel, 331 yards (303 m) long, between North Dulwich and Tulse Hill has a very ornate southern portal, surmounted by the arms of Alleyn's College, the local landowners. The southern portal is framed by pilasters on each of which are two ball finials (stone spheres); it can be seen from Tulse Hill station. The northern portal, which is hidden in a cutting, is quite plain.

Leigham Tunnel, 302 yards (276 m) long, is between Tulse Hill and Streatham Tunnel. It is also called Higher Leigham or Leigham Vale Tunnel to distinguish it from Leigham Court Tunnel on the Crystal Palace Line between Streatham Hill and Leigham Junction.

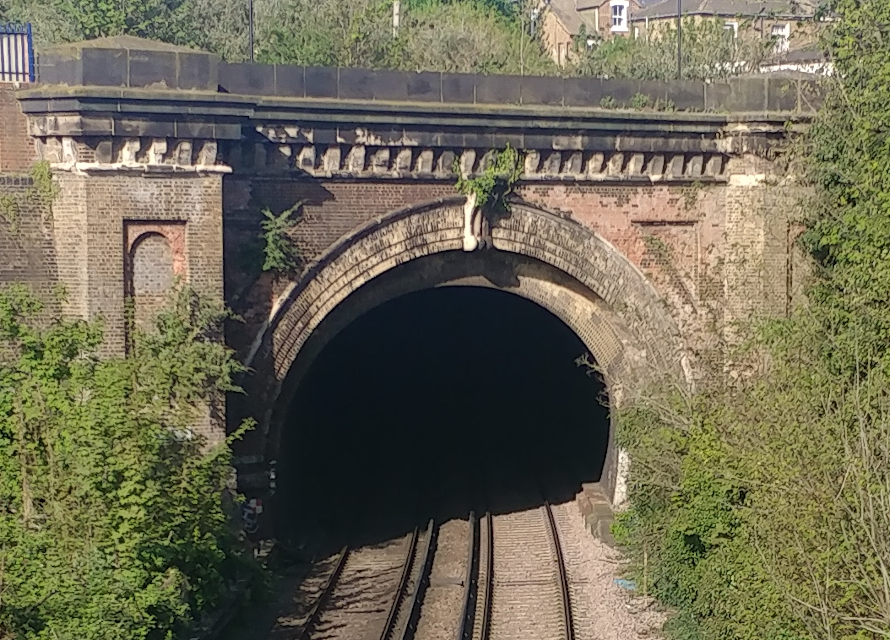
Streatham Tunnel, South Portal

Streatham Tunnel, 220 yards (200 m) long, between Leigham Tunnel and Streatham station. It is on a curve and most unusual in that the southern portal is a skewed arch, with decorative details including massive stone capping, dentils and panelled brickwork.

Mickleham Tunnel is midway between Leatherhead and Box Hill & Westhumble. It is 524 yards (479 m) long and runs through the lower chalk of Norbury Park, entering the hillside immediately north of one of the three viaducts over the River Mole. Restrictions imposed by the landowner, Thomas Grissell, meant that vertical ventilation shafts could not be constructed. The tunnel portals were given lavish architectural treatment.

Betchworth Tunnel is 0.25 miles (0.40 km) south of Dorking. It is 385 yards (352 m) long with a maximum gradient of 1 in 80 (1.25 per cent). It runs through the upper greensand of the Deepdene Ridge to the east of the town. Construction difficulties delayed the opening south of Dorking. It collapsed on 27 July 1887, remaining closed for over six months.

=== Viaducts ===
The viaduct across the grounds of Dulwich College already mentioned includes some decorated cast-iron underbridges: West Dulwich, Croxted Road Bridge (image 5).

Between Leatherhead and Dorking are a number of brick-arch viaducts over the River Mole, not as elaborate as the Dulwich viaduct but still notable: River Mole viaducts, images 3-5. Mickleham Tunnel exits directly onto one of them.

=== Sectional References ===
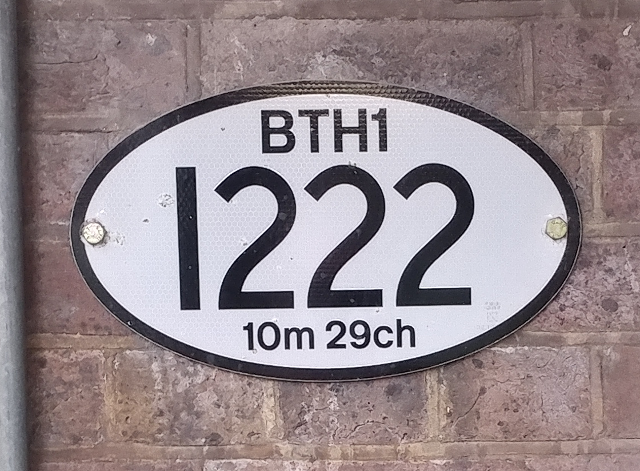
ELR Plate showing BTH1 mileage at Mitcham Junction

The Portsmouth Line is most of the Line of Route (LOR) SO680, Bermondsey Junction to Horsham, although that also includes part of what was historically known as the South London Line, (Note: The South London Line that existed from 1912 to 2012 has been significantly altered, including re-instatement of Old Kent Road Junction, new crossovers between the Brighton (ATL) and Chatham (CAT) roads, and severing the connection to the Brighton side of Victoria at Battersea Park.) from South Bermondsey to Peckham Rye.

Because of the fragmentary origins of the Portsmouth Line, for engineering purposes it comprises several distinct sections with different mileage origins. Corresponding to LOR SO680 is the Engineer's Line Reference (ELR) BTH ("Bermondsey to Horsham"), which is divided into 3 sections with mileage breaks at Sutton and Epsom.

The route from the two LBSCR London termini to Portsmouth uses various other ELRs. The following table describes the complete routes from London Bridge and Victoria to Portsmouth Harbour, (Note: Prior to 1879 the route would be measured to Portsmouth Town, 66 chains short of Portsmouth Harbour.) with the Portsmouth Line itself highlighted in blue

ELR	Built	Pre-grouping owner	From	To	Datum	Start-End	Mileage (miles.chains)
London Bridge to Sutton
LBC	1836 L&GR	LBSC	London Bridge	South Bermondsey	London Bridge	0.0 - 1.49	1.49
BTH1 (1)	1865	LBSC	South Bermondsey	Peckham Rye Junction	London Bridge	1.49 - 3.47	1.78
BTH1 (2)	1868	LBSC	Peckham Rye Junction	Sutton	London Bridge via Streatham	3.47 - 13.45	9.78
Victoria to Sutton
VTB1	1860/1862	LBSC	London Victoria	Streatham North Junction	Victoria	0.0 - 6.06	6.06
SLJ	1868	LBSC	Streatham North Junction (Slow Lines)	Streatham South Junction	Victoria	6.06 - 6.42	0.36
BTH1	1868	LBSC	Streatham South Junction	Sutton	London Bridge via Streatham	8.09 - 13.45	5.36
Sutton to Portsmouth Harbour
BTH2	1847 C&ER	LBSC	Sutton	Epsom	London Bridge via Norwood Junction	14.66 - 19.03	4.17
BTH3 (1)	1859 E&LR	LSW/LBSC Joint	Epsom	Leatherhead	Waterloo via Worcester Park	14.27 - 18.10	3.63
BTH3 (2)	1867	LBSC	Leatherhead	Dorking Junction (spur to SER)	Waterloo via Worcester Park	18.10 - 22.45	4.35
BTH3 (3)	1867 HD&LR	LBSC	Dorking Junction	Horsham	Waterloo via Worcester Park	22.45 - 35.35	12.70
TBH1	1859/1863	LBSC	Horsham	Arundel Junction North	London Bridge via Redhill	37.40 - 59.54	22.14
BLI1	1846	LBSC	Arundel Junction North	Arundel Junction South	Brighton	19.01 - 19.03	0.02
TBH2	1846/1847	LBSC	Arundel Junction South	Havant	Brighton	19.03 - 37.25	18.22
WPH2 (1)	1847	LBSC	Havant	Portcreek Junction	Brighton	37.25 - 41.03	3.58
WPH2 (2)	1847/1876	LBSC/LSW Joint	Portcreek Junction	Portsmouth Harbour	Brighton	41.03 - 45.36	4.33
London Bridge to Portsmouth Harbour							87.39
Victoria to Portsmouth Harbour							85.72

== Services ==
Extract from the Portsmouth Line timetable for summer 1912

From the 1870s the LBSCR operated Portsmouth services over this line (as well as the Mid-Sussex route) in competition with the LSWR Portsmouth Direct Line. At over 11 miles longer (85m 72ch from Victoria vs. 74m 24ch from Waterloo) it could not compete for the principal London to Portsmouth traffic, but it maintained a viable existence providing a Portsmouth and South Coast service for intermediate stations and the many branch connections. It was also used for services from London to Littlehampton and Bognor, including dividing trains and slip-coaches.

After the Grouping the Southern Railway concluded that there was no longer a need for competing routes to Portsmouth and in 1924 withdrew the fast service from Victoria. There was a public outcry, prompting wider criticism of SR services and leading to the appointment for the first time of a "Public Relations" manager. Within a year the SR reinstated the Victoria to Portsmouth expresses.

The Portsmouth Line was still used by fast & semi-fast trains from Victoria and London Bridge to Portsmouth after nationalisation. Then in 1978 to meet growing demand at Gatwick Airport those services were re-routed via the Brighton Main Line to Three Bridges then the Mid-Sussex Line, reverting to the service that operated between 1863 and 1867.

The Portsmouth Line is now used only for suburban services and occasional diversionary routing. A representative (but not exhaustive) selection of services as of 2020 (weekday off-peak):

=== Southern ===
- London Bridge to East Croydon and beyond via Tulse Hill, Streatham and Selhurst
- London Bridge to Beckenham Junction via Tulse Hill and Crystal Palace
- Victoria to Dorking and Horsham via Mitcham Junction, Sutton and Epsom

Epsom Downs services usually run via Wallington and only interchange with the Portsmouth Line at Sutton.

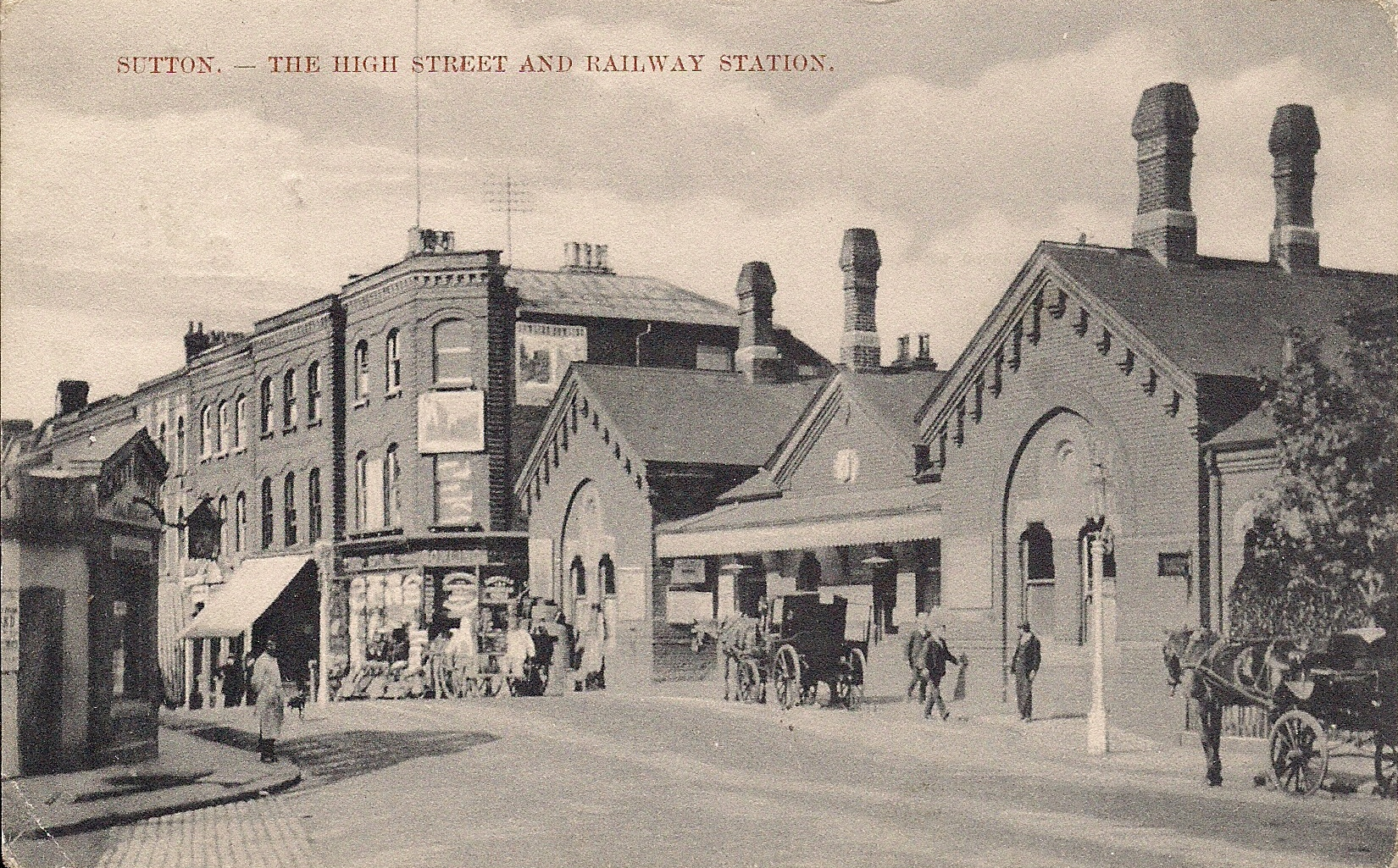
Sutton Station in 1905.

=== South Western Railway ===
- Waterloo to Dorking via Epsom
- Waterloo to Guildford via Epsom

=== Thameslink ===
- Luton or St. Albans to Sutton via Wimbledon (Sutton Loop anti-clockwise)
- Luton or St. Albans to Sutton via Mitcham Junction (Sutton Loop clockwise)

Thameslink Sutton Loop services join the Portsmouth Line at Tulse Hill. The Thameslink Peterborough to Horsham service runs via Three Bridges.

== See also ==
- South London Line
- Croydon and Epsom Railway
- Epsom and Leatherhead Railway
- Horsham, Dorking and Leatherhead Railway
- Arun Valley Line
- West Coastway Line
- Portsmouth and Ryde Joint Railway
