= Ascot lines of the London and South Western Railway =

The Ascot lines of the London and South Western Railway were formed of a line from Staines to Wokingham, and another from Ascot to Aldershot East Junction. The London and South Western Railway (LSWR) was operating trains from London to Staines and Windsor in 1850. An independent railway company, the Staines, Woking and Wokingham Junction Railway built a line from Staines to Wokingham, where it connected with the Reading, Guildford and Reigate Junction Railway. The Staines company had running powers giving it access to Reading. It never built the Woking part of the network in its title. The opening of the line in 1856 gave the LSWR the opportunity to run throughout from London to Reading.

Aldershot was increasing in importance and the LSWR decided to build a line from Ascot to Aldershot. It opened this line in two stages, in 1878 and 1879. Both the Reading and the Aldershot lines were electrified in 1939.

Although the territory through which the line passes was sparse at the beginning, it has slowly built up and outer suburban commuting is now active over the line. The development of diverse light industry at Bracknell and in Reading has led to two-way residential travel. Apart from certain spur connections, the lines remain active at the present day.

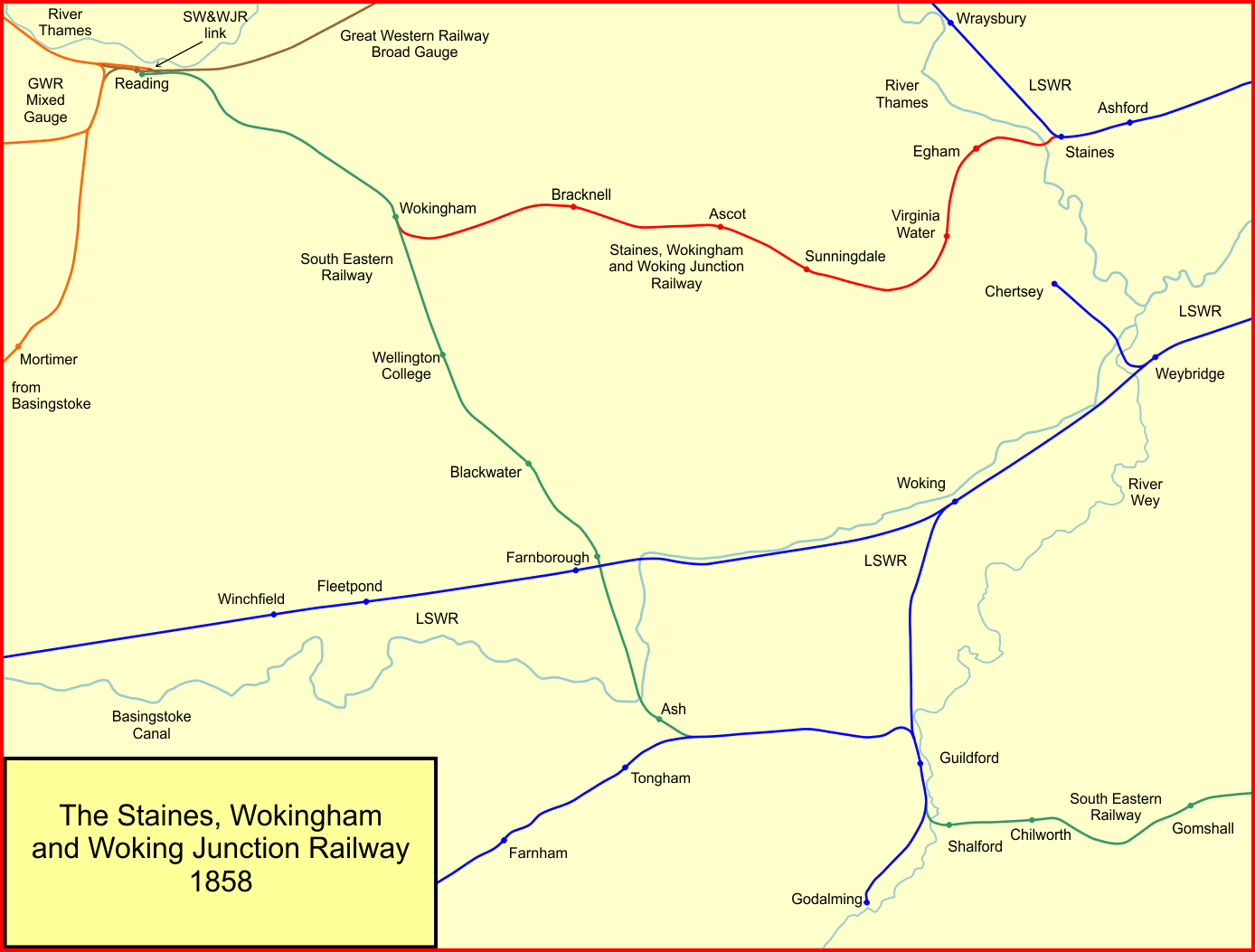
System map of the Staines to Wokingham railway in 1858

== History ==
=== Reaching Staines ===
A London and South Western Railway branch line from its main line at Weybridge to Egham had been authorised by an act of Parliament, the London and South Western Railway (Chertsey and Egham Branch) Act 1846 (9 & 10 Vict. c. clxxiv), on 16 July 1846. In 1847 the Windsor, Staines and South Western Railway was promoted in Parliament, and two authorising acts of Parliament were passed for it on the same day, 25 June 1847. The Windsor, Staines, and South-western Railway Act (No. 1) 1847 (10 & 11 Vict. c. lviii) was for an extension from Richmond to Windsor, which was duly constructed. The Windsor, Staines, and South-western Railway Act (No. 2) 1847 (10 & 11 Vict. c. lvii) authorised a line from a point west of Staines through Egham and Woking to Pirbright, with a branch to Chertsey. In authorising the No. 2 Act, Parliament decided to cut back the LSWR Egham branch, and reduced it to the length from Weybridge to Chertsey only.

The greatly reduced branch from Weybridge to Chertsey opened on 14 February 1848. The WS&SWR branch to Pirbright was never built as the shortage of railway investment money following the collapse of the Railway Mania made it impossible to pay for it.

The Windsor, Staines and South Western Railway succeeded in constructing its Windsor line, opening from Richmond to Staines and Datchet on 22 August 1848, extending to Windsor the following year. The LSWR worked the line, and took it over in 1850.

=== South Eastern Railway at Reading ===
The Reading, Guildford and Reigate Junction Railway (RG&RJR) was independently promoted, and opened its line between Reading and Farnborough on 4 July 1849. The following year, the RG&RJR was opened throughout to Redhill, giving it a link to London. It was leased by the South Eastern Railway (SER), which adopted a challenging attitude to the Great Western Railway (GWR). The RG&RJR station was a small affair at a lower level than the well established GWR station. The GWR was a broad gauge railway, so there was no interconnection due to the incompatible gauges.

In October 1852 the SER presented a parliamentary bill to extend their line to Oxford by laying a narrow gauge (Note: At the time there was not yet a "standard" gauge, and the track gauge that we now call standard was then called narrow.) track alongside the GWR as far as Oxford. In addition they planned to upgrade their Reading station at a cost of £10,000. On 4 August 1853 the extension was authorised in an act of Parliament, the South-eastern Railway (Reading Extension) Act 1853 (16 & 17 Vict. c. cxxi) but only as far as Reading itself. It was necessary to agree the details of SER access to the GWR station area with that company, but the SER's dubious tactics in the past did not encourage the GWR to hasten to finalise matters.

=== LSWR to Wokingham ===
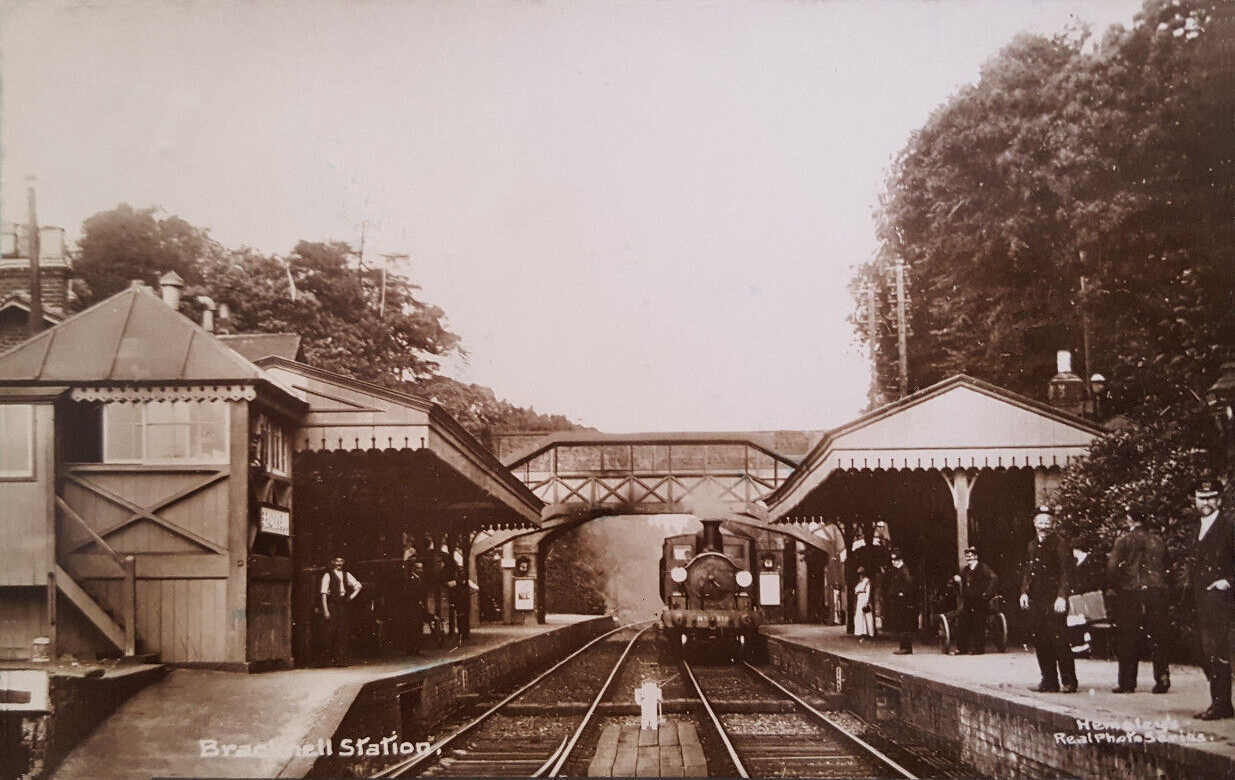
Bracknell railway station with steam train

Independent promoters put forward a Staines, Wokingham and Woking Railway, and they obtained their authorising act of Parliament, the Staines, Wokingham, and Woking Railway Act 1853 (16 & 17 Vict. c. lxxxv), on 8 July 1853. Share capital was to be £300,000, for a double track line 18 miles long from Staines to Wokingham, with a branch five miles long through Chobham to Woking. At Wokingham the line would connect to the Reading, Guildford and Reigate Railway; running powers would get trains to Reading.

The SW&WJR opened from Staines to Ascot on 4 June 1856. R. A. Williams says that the continuation to Wokingham was held back until 9 July 1856 to prevent the SER from profiting from the Ascot race traffic. The LSWR worked the line, a 42-year lease of 25 March 1858 giving it 50% of gross receipts. At that time, the area was undeveloped and business was limited, and train services were correspondingly thin.

The Reading station of the RG&RJR was a timber train shed with a single two-faced platform.

=== Into and through Reading ===
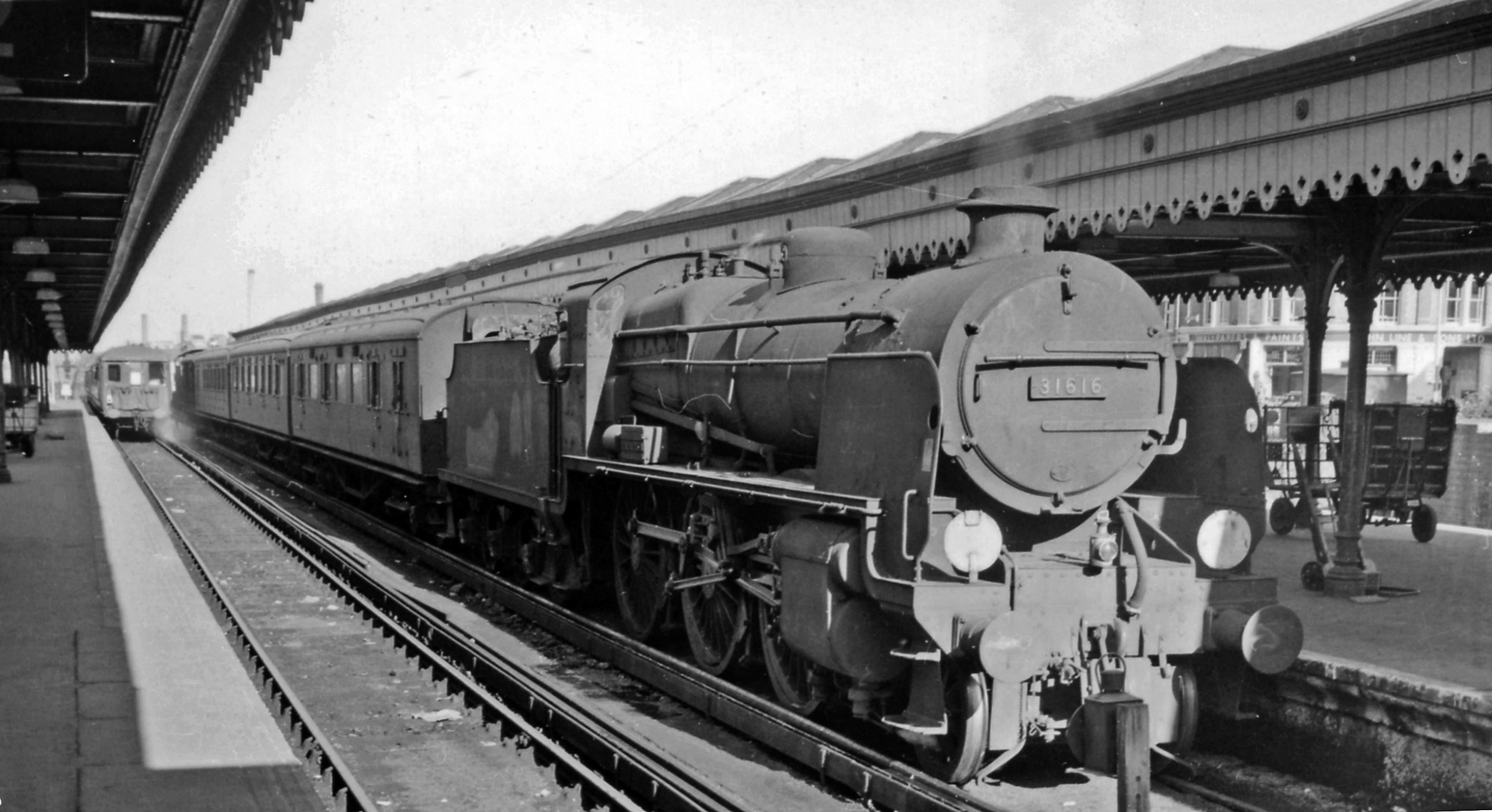
Reading Southern station, with steam train from Redhill

At the time of the Staines, Wokingham, and Woking Railway Act 1853, it had declared that its objective was to reach Oxford. The Great Western Railway was dominant at Reading and Oxford, and the GWR was a broad gauge railway, preventing any through running. The SW&WJR was encouraged when an act of Parliament of 31 July 1854, the Great Western, Birmingham and Chester Railways Act 1854 (17 & 18 Vict. c. ccxxii), required the GWR to add narrow gauge to its line between Oxford and Basingstoke. This was to facilitate access by the Oxford, Worcester and Wolverhampton Railway to the LSWR at Basingstoke.

The GWR converted its line from Oxford to Reading and from Reading to Basingstoke to mixed gauge on 22 December 1856. On the same date it opened the Reading Loop, a west-to-south connection between those two lines. The mixed gauge was not brought into Reading station, and was only available as a by-pass, in accordance with the strict terms of the act. The by-pass line was a mile to the west of Reading station, and the GWR was disinclined to facilitate the intruder. The SW&WJR negotiated with the OW&WR to seek support and access to the north over their line.

The SW&WJR went to Parliament in 1855 with a bill for a connecting line from the SER station to the mixed gauge lines, but the Commons committee rejected the proposal. By now, both the LSWR (as sponsors of the SW&WJR) and the SER had become determined to get some connection at Reading, and the GWR accepted the inevitability of it. In June 1856 the SER planned a line at Reading to reach the Oxford and Basingstoke line to the west of Reading, which would cost £30,000. The SW&WJR also wanted a line to join the GWR "in the parish of Tilehurst", in other words on the west side of Reading. This would diverge from the SER line on the approaches to Reading and pass under the GWR main line, running past Reading GWR on the north side. The SW&WJ Bill was passed on 27 July 1857, not being opposed by the GWR.

The act stipulated that the SW&WJR could lay the new line unless "the Great Western did not within a year make a narrow-gauge line thence to a certain point east of their Reading Station; in which case the Staines Company might only complete the connecting link from that point." The GWR naturally preferred to construct the track on their property themselves, and they installed a single narrow-gauge line on the north side of the main line from the junction of the Basingstoke Loop (Reading West Junction) for a mile and a quarter (2 km) past Reading station and down to the ground level, curving round to pass under the main line at a very acute angle to join the Staines Company's short branch from the South Eastern Railway. This finished within the time limited by the act, but the link was not opened for traffic until the exchange sidings on the low level were ready on 1 December 1858. Its completion inaugurated a new route between the Midlands and North of England and the Kent ports, and through them with the Continent.

Accordingly, there was a nine-chain section belonging to the SW&WJ. The Reading Junction line opened to goods on 1 December 1858 and to passengers from 17 January 1859, though passenger usage was very limited. The Great Western Railway soon installed mixed gauge on its main line from Paddington to Reading; it was ready on 1 October 1861, and on that date the through narrow gauge line was reduced to siding status, as the through running facility for narrow gauge trains was now available on the main line. It was not until March 1862 that the south curve, Reading station to Oxford Road Junction (giving direct running from Reading to Basingstoke) was mixed.

=== Chertsey to Virginia Water ===
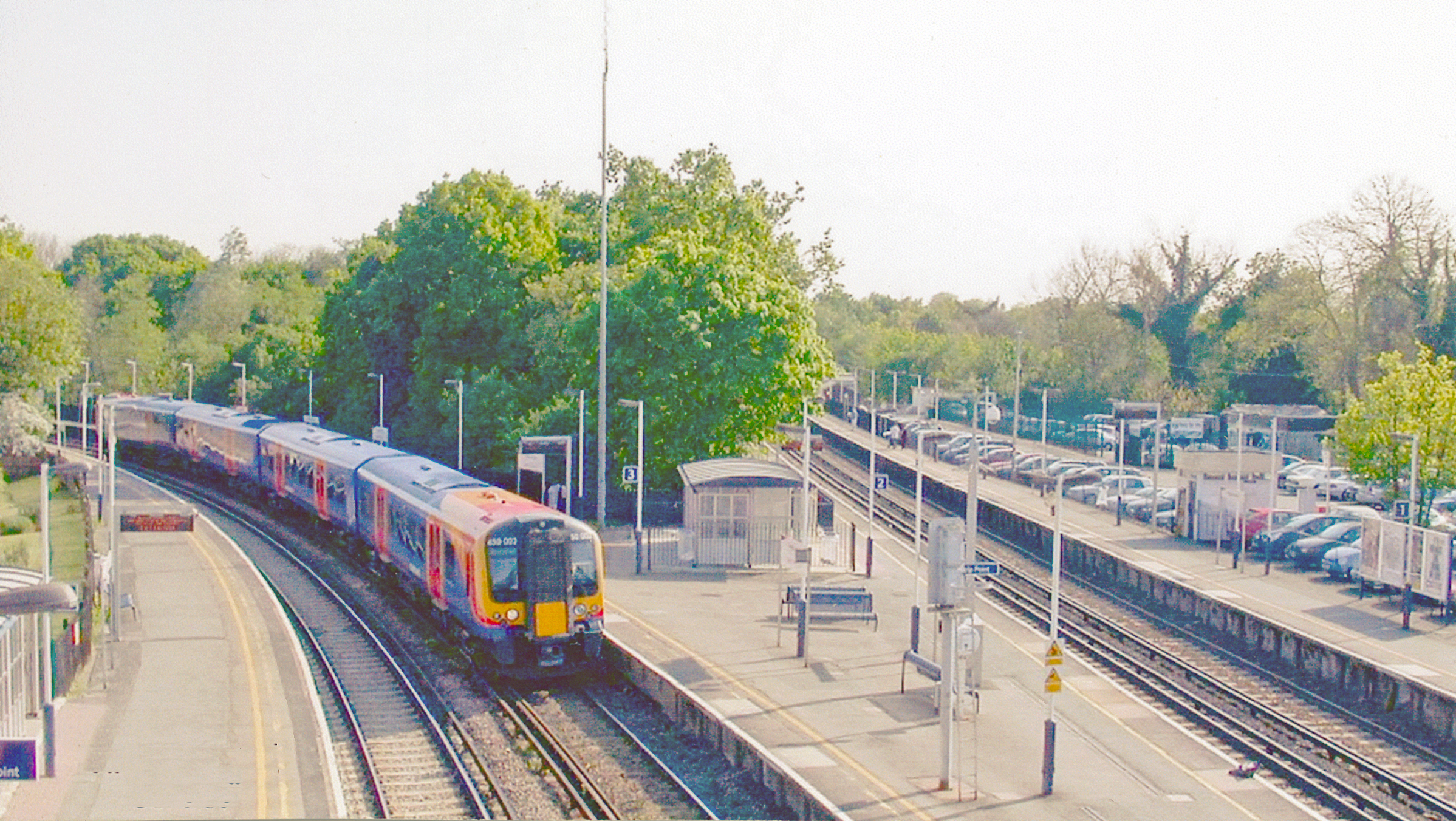
Virginia Water: the train is arriving from Chertsey; the Ascot direction is to the top centre of the frame

Since 1848 Chertsey had been a terminus from Weybridge, and local people found that unsatisfactory The LSWR obtained an act of Parliament, the South Western Railway (Chertsey Extension) Act 1864 (27 & 28 Vict. c. lxxxvii), of 23 June 1864 with capital of £45,000 to extend from Chertsey to the Staines, Wokingham and Woking Junction line. The LSWR was partly motivated by the desire to exclude independent promoters from taking this course of action. The 2 1/2 miles (4.0 km) double-line extension was opened on 1 October 1866. Chertsey station was shifted to a location just north of the level crossing. The junction at Virginia Water was made a triangular connection by the addition of a single-line east to south spur (Chertsey towards Ascot). On 10 December 1898 In late 1897 the spur was doubled.

=== LSWR takeover of the SW&WJR ===
The LSWR took a new lease of the SW&WJR from 1 July 1877, and absorbed it by the South-western Railway Act 1878 (41 & 42 Vict. c. cxxvi) of 4 July 1878 for a share swap in the value of £445,000.

=== Staines west curve ===
The LSWR got powers in section 6 of the South Western Railway (Various Powers) Act 1883 (46 & 47 Vict. c. clxxxix), passed on 20 August 1883, for a 400 yards (370 m) curve between the Windsor and the Ascot lines and forming a triangle at Staines. It opened on 1 July 1884; a new station called Staines High Street was opened north of the curve on the Windsor line. There were five weekday trains between Windsor and Ascot. When the Byfleet Curve opened, a new passenger service between Windsor and Woking via both curves began, on 1 May 1889. In addition the Royal Train used the route to get from Windsor to the Solent for visits to the Isle of Wight.

=== Ascot to Aldershot ===
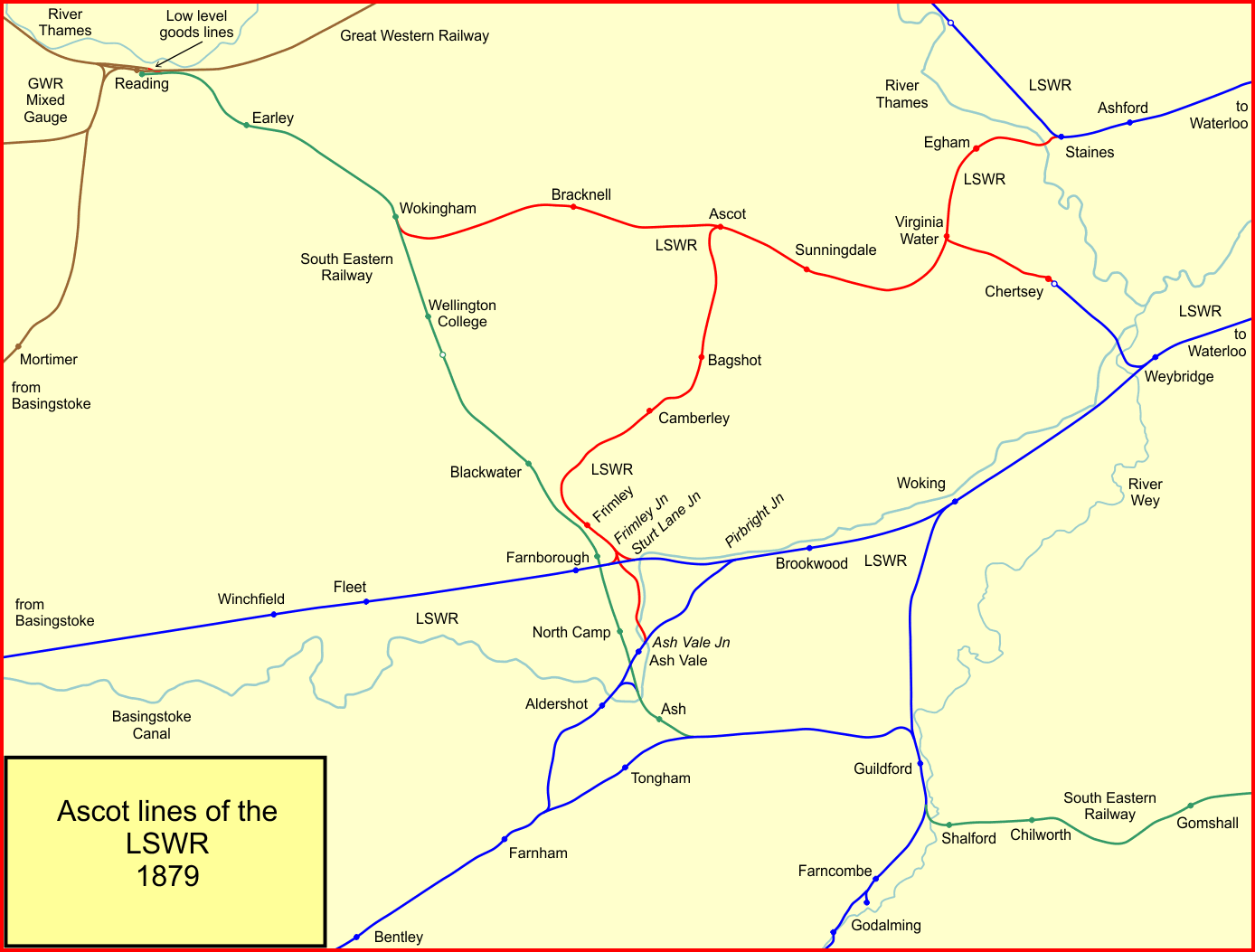
System map of the Staines to Wokingham and Aldershot lines in 1879

Over the years a very large number of independent schemes were put forward for railways in the space between Windsor and Aldershot. All of them failed in Parliament or were unable to raise funds, but the LSWR became nervous that sooner or later one would succeed, so it promoted its own line from Ascot southward to Aldershot. The result was the South Western Railway Act 1873 (36 & 37 Vict. c. lxxi) of 16 June 1873 for such a line. It would be a little under 12 miles long, joining the Pirbright Junction to Aldershot line, which had opened in 1870 east of North Camp station.

After delays, part of the line was opened on 18 March 1878 as a single line from Ascot to Frimley Junction and then double track on Frimley curve to Sturt Lane Junction, facing Woking. Six weekdays-only trains ran each way between Woking and Ascot. Goods traffic began operation on 1 April 1878. It was not until 2 June 1879 that the line was continued to North Camp; passenger trains ran from Aldershot to Frimley only, so passengers for Ascot had to change at Frimley to one of the Woking trains. There was also a Farnborough curve from Frimley Junction facing west on the LSWR main line; this opened for traffic by 1887. The west curve to Farnborough Junction was only traversed from 1 June 1901, by a Waterloo—Ascot—Basingstoke train. It was reduced to Saturdays only in October 1908, and it ran for the last time on 26 December 1914. However the curve was heavily used by special trains during Ascot race week. It was further used by a scheduled service in the 1930s: a service ran between Ascot and Winchfield from 17 July 1933 to 4 July 1937.

The line from Frimley Junction to Ascot was later doubled; it was ready on 11 June 1893, but the section south of Frimley remains single to the present day.

== Electrification ==
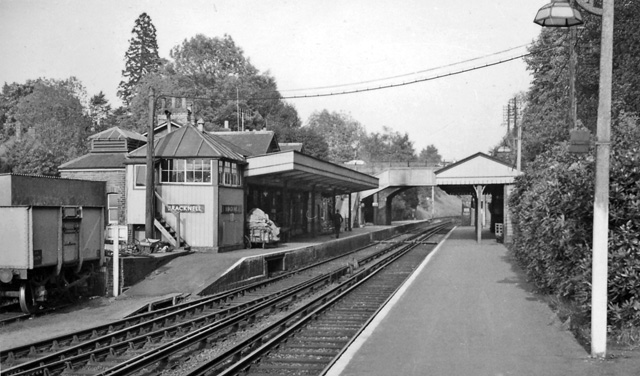
Bracknell station

In 1935 the electrification of the Portsmouth Direct line was conceived. The Southern Railway, owners of the route, were assisted by government loans following the Railways (Agreement) Act 1935 (26 Geo. 5 & 1 Edw. 8. c. 6). The purpose of the act was to encourage capital works with the aim of alleviating unemployment. The scheme was known as the Portsmouth No. 1 Electrification Scheme. As well as the Portsmouth line, it included some branches, and in particular it included the line from Weybridge to Staines via Chertsey. The Windsor line had already been electrified. From 30 November 1936 electric operation took place on the Weybridge to Virginia Water line for staff training, and on 3 January 1937 the full service started.

In October 1937 the Southern Railway Board authorised the extension of the electrification from Virginia Water to Reading and Aldershot. The track layout at Ascot had been arranged with separate pairs of platforms for the Reading and the Frinley lines respectively. The layout was altered so that trains to Reading could detach an Aldershot portion, which could then proceed from the Reading platform towards Aldershot, which had not previously been possible. The former Aldershot line platforms were mostly used for berthing the stock of race specials, and after June 1973 they were closed. A further and final batch of 36 units of the 2-BIL class was procured to work the Reading line services. The rolling stock requirement was based on the operation of six-coach trains in the peaks.

Public electric services commenced on the newly electrified sections on 1 January 1939. The new timetable was based on halfhourly departures from/to Waterloo, running fast to Staines and then all stations to Ascot where the train split into Reading and Guildford portions. Single two-car units were often used between Ascot and Guildford/Reading, requiring only a four-coach train from Waterloo. A peculiar rush-hour working was the 5.37 pm Waterloo - Woking service, which ran via Richmond, Ascot, Camberley and around the Sturt Lane spur to Brookwood and Woking.

== Locations ==
=== Main line ===
- Staines; opened 22 August 1848; still open;
- Egham; opened 4 June 1856; still open;
- Virginia Water; divergence to Chertsey line; opened 9 July 1856; still open;
- Virginia Water West Junction; forms triangular junction for Chertsey;
- Longcross; used by Military from about 1940; opened to public 21 September 1942; still open;
- Sunningdale; opened 4 June 1856; still open;
- Ascot; opened 4 June 1856; still open; divergence to Frimley (below);
- Martins Heron; opened 3 October 1988; still open;
- Bracknell; opened 9 July 1856; still open;
- Wokingham; opened 4 July 1849; still open; convergence with South Eastern Railway line from Reigate Junction, with running powers to Reading.

=== Camberley branch ===
- Ascot; above;
- Bagshot; opened 18 March 1878; still open;
- Camberley & York Town; opened 18 March 1878; renamed Camberley 1923; still open;
- Frimley; opened 18 March 1878; still open;
- Frimley Junction; divergence to Sturt Lane Junction and to Farnborough Junction on LSWR main line;
- Aldershot West Junction; convergence with line from Pirbright Junction.
