= Epsom and Leatherhead Railway =

The Epsom and Leatherhead Railway (E&LR) was a railway company in Surrey, England. Promoted independently, it opened its short line in 1859 and was worked by the London and South Western Railway (LSWR). It was transferred to the joint ownership of the LSWR and the London, Brighton and South Coast Railway (LBSCR) in 1860. Those companies operated passenger trains to Waterloo and London Bridge station respectively. In 1867 the LBSCR built an extension line from Leatherhead to Dorking, with the declared intention of continuing to the Sussex coast. A new Leatherhead station was built on the new line, and the LSWR was obliged to build its own independent, new Leatherhead station; this was a terminus for some years.

In 1885 the LSWR opened a new line from Hampton Court Junction, near Surbiton, to Guildford via Cobham, the New Guildford line. This had a branch from Effingham to Leatherhead, terminating at the 1867 station which became a through station. Some trains ran from Waterloo to Guildford via the E&LR and Effingham. Meanwhile the LBSCR developed the main line into Sussex, slowly increasing fast services on the route. The E&LR line was electrified in 1925, and in 1938 electrification was continued to the south coast and on to Portsmouth; electrically operated express trains ran over the E&LR route.

At the present day the express trains have been diverted to the Gatwick Airport route, but the E&LR continues to serve commuters and other local passenger requirements.

== History ==
=== The Croydon and Epsom Railway ===
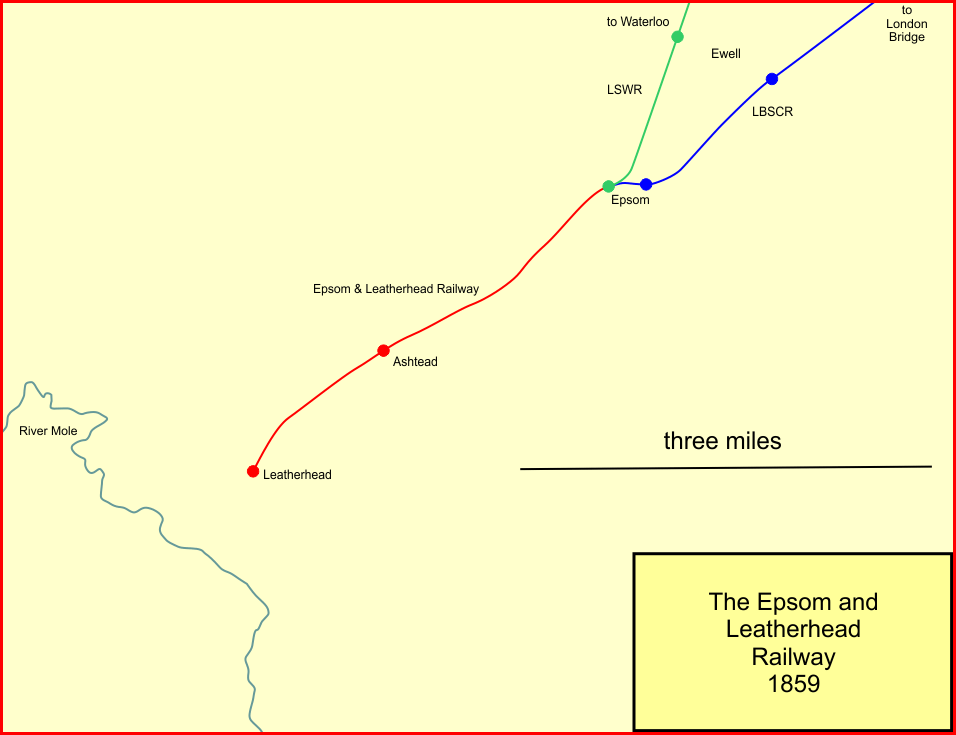
The Epsom and Leatherhead Railway in 1859

The London and Croydon Railway had started operation in 1839, and used the atmospheric system of traction. On 29 July 1844 an affiliated company, the Croydon and Epsom Railway, was authorised by the Croydon and Epsom Railway Act 1844 (7 & 8 Vict. c. xcii). It too would use the atmospheric system. In fact at one stage a direct London and Portsmouth Railway using that system throughout was proposed, using the Epsom extension as part of its route.

The London and Croydon Railway amalgamated with the London and Brighton Railway and the Croydon and Epsom Railway, as well as certain others, resulting in the formation of the London, Brighton and South Coast Railway, by the London and Brighton Railway Act 1846 (9 & 10 Vict. c. cclxxxii) of 27 July 1846. The London and Croydon Railway had been experiencing a series of practical difficulties with the operation on the atmospheric system, and at the end of 1846 the new LBSCR decided to abandon the system, and use steam engines on the Croydon and Epsom line. The line opened to Epsom on 10 May 1847, worked by steam locomotives. The Epsom station was some way east of the present-day station, on the north side of Upper High Street.

=== Epsom and Leatherhead Railway ===
Epsom and Leatherhead Railway Act 1856
- Act of Parliament
- Parliament of the United Kingdom
- Long title: An Act for making a Railway from the Epsom Branch of the London, Brighton, and South Coast Railway at Epsom to Leatherhead.
- Citation: 19 & 20 Vict. c. xcii

Dates
- Royal assent: 14 July 1856

Text of statute as originally enacted

Local interests had promoted the Epsom and Leatherhead Railway, and they received its authorising act of Parliament, the Epsom and Leatherhead Railway Act 1856 (19 & 20 Vict. c. xcii) on 14 July 1856; authorised share capital was £30,000. The act authorised the establishment of a joint station to which the LBSCR would be a party, to the west of their existing Croydon and Epsom terminus. The E&LR line would be a single track, 3 miles 54 chains (3.68 miles, 5.91 km) in extent, from near the LBSCR station at Epsom via Ashtead to a terminus on the east side of Kingston Road, Leatherhead.

The promoters of the E&LR encouraged the development of another scheme, the Wimbledon and Dorking Railway (W&DR), for a line from what became Raynes Park station on the LSWR main line, to Epsom, joining the E&LR there. This obtained an authorising act of Parliament, the Wimbledon and Dorking Railway Act 1857 (20 & 21 Vict. c. lxxii) on 27 July 1857. A further act of Parliament, the Wimbledon and Dorking, and Epsom and Leatherhead Railways (Epsom Joint Station) Act 1859 (22 Vict. c. iii), authorised the W&DR to use the joint station at Epsom. The LSWR was persuaded to construct part of the W&DR, between Raynes Park and Epsom, as a double line, and to work it.

The LSWR had made an agreement with the LBSCR in 1858 not to promote or encourage lines that might encroach on one another's territory. (Note: Such an agreement would almost certainly be a breach of competition law nowadays.) The W&DR as far as Epsom complied with the agreement, and the LSWR was working the E&LR's line, but now the E&LR company asked the LSWR to agree to work the Epsom and Leatherhead line. In compliance with the territorial agreement, the LSWR refused. In frustration the E&LR company applied to Leo Schuster, the chairman of the LBSCR, who immediately agreed to work and lease the E&LR. This was directly in breach of the agreement. At this stage, the E&LR directors hesitated to proceed, partly because the LBSCR route to London was longer, which they thought would diminish the business that their company would do. They put the question to a general shareholders' meeting, which instructed the board to negotiate with the LSWR.

It emerged now that the LBSCR was planning to build a line to Horsham and later on to Portsmouth, directly in disregard of the territorial agreement. In view of the bad faith on the part of the LBSCR, the LSWR now felt free to make a deal: it leased the E&LR line, and opened it to traffic on 1 February 1859, between the joint station at Epsom and its terminus at Leatherhead. It was a single line and there was one intermediate station at Ashtead. As the other railways had not yet connected to the joint station, the line was physically isolated, and through passengers for London had to make their own way between a temporary E&LR station at Epsom and the LBSCR terminus. On 4 April following, the W&DR line opened between Raynes Park and Epsom joint station, and through trains to London were started. There were seven passenger trains each way every weekday.

The short connection from the LBSCR station at Epsom to the joint station was opened on 8 August 1859, so connecting the LBSCR to the line. LBSCR trains now started working on the E&LR line: six trains each way worked to London Bridge. At Epsom the 1859 joint LSWR and LBSCR station was a very basic structure with side platforms and a double line junction at the London end. At Ashtead, trains initially stopped only by request at a platform with minimal facilities on the south side of the single line. The 1859 terminus at Barnett Wood, Leatherhead appears also to have been a simple affair, possibly of wooden construction, with a single platform on the east side.

=== Transfer to joint status ===
Epsom and Leatherhead Railway (South Western and Brighton) Act 1860
- Act of Parliament
- Parliament of the United Kingdom
- Long title: An Act for authorizing the Transfer of the Epsom and Leatherhead Railway, and for other Purposes.
- Citation: 23 & 24 Vict. c. clviii

Dates
- Royal assent: 23 July 1860

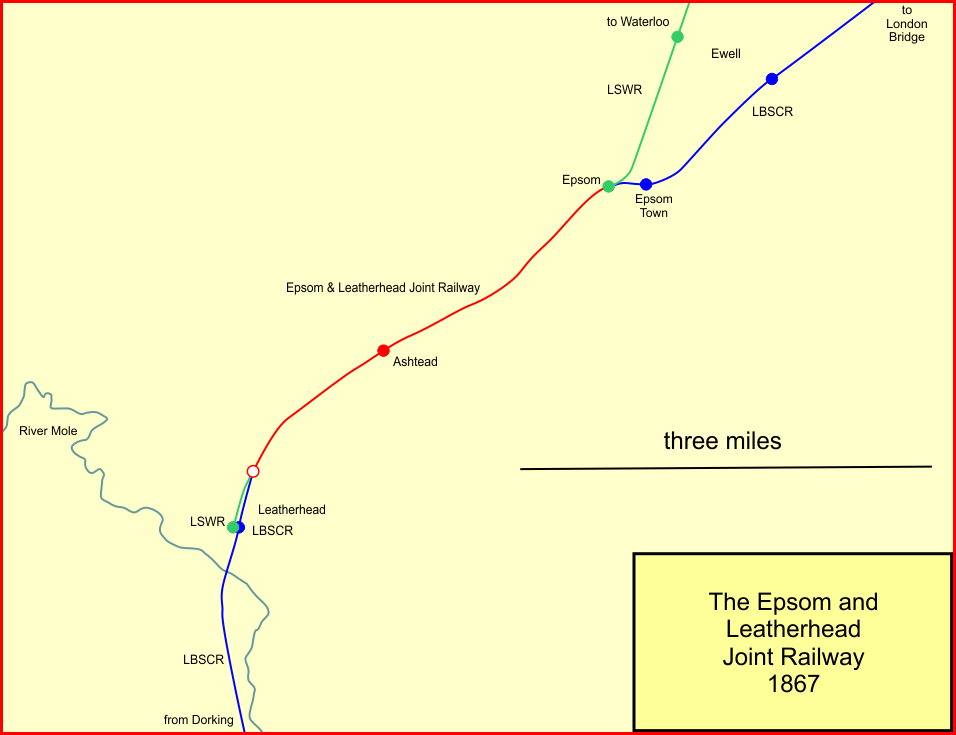
The Epsom and Leatherhead Railway in 1867

The LSWR and the LBSCR agreed that it would be appropriate to make the E&LR a jointly owned and operated line, and the Epsom and Leatherhead Railway (South Western and Brighton) Act 1860 (23 & 24 Vict. c. clviii) of 23 July 1860 transferred the line to them jointly, and by the South Western Railway Act 1863 (26 & 27 Vict. c. xc) of 21 July 1863 a joint LBSCR and LSWR committee was set up to operate it. The Wimbledon to Epsom line was transferred from the WDR to the LSWR by the South Western Railway (Additional Powers) Act 1862 (25 & 26 Vict. c. xlii). The Dorking aspirations of the W&DR had long since been put aside.

In fact it was the LBSCR which pressed ahead with a line to the south. On 13 July 1863 it obtained the London, Brighton, and South Coast Railway (Dorking to Leatherhead) Act 1863 (26 & 27 Vict. c. cxxxvii) which gave authorisation for a line from Leatherhead to Dorking. By this time the company had decided on pursuing a trunk route through to Horsham and into Mid-Sussex.

South-western Railway (Various Powers) Act 1864
- Act of Parliament
- Parliament of the United Kingdom
- Long title: An Act for the Amalgamation of divers Railway Companies with the London and South-western Railway Company; for authorizing that Company to make and maintain additional Lines of Railway, and to raise further Monies; and for other Purposes.
- Citation: 27 & 28 Vict. c. ccxxvii

Dates
- Royal assent: 25 July 1864

Text of statute as originally enacted

As the LBSCR traffic would include a number of through trains whereas the LSWR trains all terminated at Leatherhead, it was agreed between the two companies that each should have a separate, but adjacent, station on the extension line, the LSWR station being a terminus. The original 1859 joint station was now recognised as being inconveniently located and unsuitable for conversion as a through station. The South-western Railway (Various Powers) Act 1864 (27 & 28 Vict. c. ccxxvii) of 25 July 1864 authorised an extension at Leatherhead (from the old joint station to the new dual stations) was opened on 4 March 1867, and the line was doubled between Epsom and Leatherhead on the same day. For one week, the Brighton's station was still a terminus, as the line on to Dorking was not opened until 11 March 1867. The LSWR station was also a terminus for the time being.

=== New Guildford line and the branch from Effingham ===
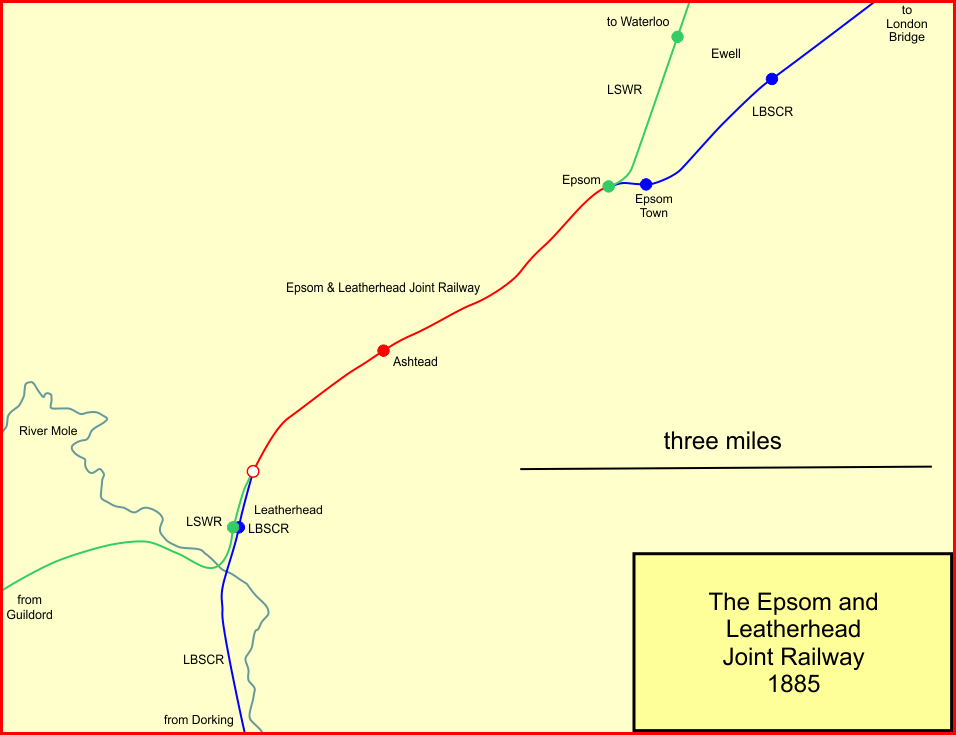
The Epsom and Leatherhead Railway in 1885

In 1881 there was a parliamentary battle between the LSWR and a proposed Guildford, Kingston and London Railway (GK&LR). The GK&LR was projected to connect Guildford, through Cobham and Kingston, to Putney Bridge station (then referred to as Fulham), with trains running through on the Metropolitan District Railway to central London and the City. The LSWR proposed a defensive scheme for a line between Hampton Court Junction and Guildford via Cobham. In Parliament, the two groups agreed to separate the schemes: the GK&LR would build the section eastwards from Surbiton to Fulham, and the LSWR would build its own section to the south-west. This arrangement was authorised by the South Western Railway Act 1881 (44 & 45 Vict. c. ccix) of 22 August 1881.

In fact the GK&LR was unable to raise the considerable subscription it needed to proceed, and the project failed. The LSWR proceeded with its line, which became known as the New Guildford line. It opened on 2 February 1885 and included a branch from what later became Effingham Junction station to Leatherhead, with a station at Bookham.

=== Simplification at Leatherhead ===
In 1927 the original Leatherhead joint station, used after 1867 by LSWR trains, was closed, a new spur being put in to enable trains from the Bookham direction to run directly into the former Brighton station. Since the grouping of the railways in 1923 following the Railways Act 1921, both the LSWR and the LBSCR had been incorporated into the new Southern Railway, so that the old rivalry was no longer active. Two years later, in 1929, the former LSWR station at Epsom was completely reconstructed with four platforms to enable the trains on the former Brighton route to use it, and the old Epsom Town station was closed.

=== Electrification ===
The line was electrified over the E&LR route on 12 July 1925 as part of the LSWR suburban electrification scheme. The former LBSCR route from London Bridge via Croydon to Dorking followed on 3 March 1929.

On 30 June 1938 the Portsmouth Electrification No 2 Scheme was inaugurated, completing electrification from Horsham to Bognor Regis and Portsmouth. This enabled a regular interval passenger service in which the fastest trains ran from Victoria via Sutton, Epsom, Leatherhead, and Horsham. These trains made no stops on the E&LR line.

== Passenger train services ==
After the initial LSWR service of seven trains each way on weekdays, the passenger train service progressively increased in frequency. In 1895 there were 17 trains each weekday from Waterloo and six to and from Bookham and Effingham Junction. The LBSCR local service was much less frequent, but there were nine trains daily from London to the coast, including a "Special fast train to Ventnor" (non-stop Sutton to Fratton, and another Isle of Wight Express, non-stop from London Bridge to Chichester.

The 1922 timetable shows approximately hourly trains on the LSWR route from Waterloo, mostly continuing to Horsley. Nineteen stopping trains ran on the LBSCR route, supplemented by thirteen trains from Victoria or London Bridge to Portsmouth.

By 1974 the timetable had settled down to regular intervals, with two trains and hour from Waterloo to Guildford, one an hour from Victoria to Horsham stopping, and one an hour to the coast, calling at Victoria, Sutton, Dorking, Horsham etc.

After 1978 the coast trains were mostly diverted via Three Bridges to serve Gatwick Airport.

As of 2022 there are two trains an hour from Waterloo to Dorking and Guildford alternately; on the Victoria route trains run twice an hour, to Dorking and Horsham alternately.

== Locations ==
- Epsom; LBSCR station on Croydon and Epsom line; opened 10 May 1847; sometimes named Epsom Town, and definitely from 9 July 1923; closed 3 March 1929, when trains started using the former LSWR station;
- Epsom; originally LSWR station; opened 1 February 1859; still open; occasionally named Epsom High Street;
- Ashtead; opened 1 February 1859; still open;
- Leatherhead; joint station opened 1 February 1859; replaced on 4 March 1867 by two stations, each about a half mile south;
- Leatherhead LBSCR station; opened 4 March 1867; still open;
- Leatherhead LSWR station; opened 4 March 1867 (SR); closed 10 July 1927 when trains were diverted to the ex-LBSCR station.
