= Wimbledon and Dorking Railway =

The Wimbledon and Dorking Railway (W&DR) was an early railway company in southern England. It was independently promoted with the intention of penetrating into West Sussex, but it only succeeded in getting authorisation as far as Epsom. It joined the Epsom and Leatherhead Railway there, and opened in 1859.

It was absorbed into the London and South Western Railway (LSWR) in 1862. It was electrified in 1925.

Today it forms an important part of the Surrey commuter network

== History ==
=== Croydon and Epsom Railway ===
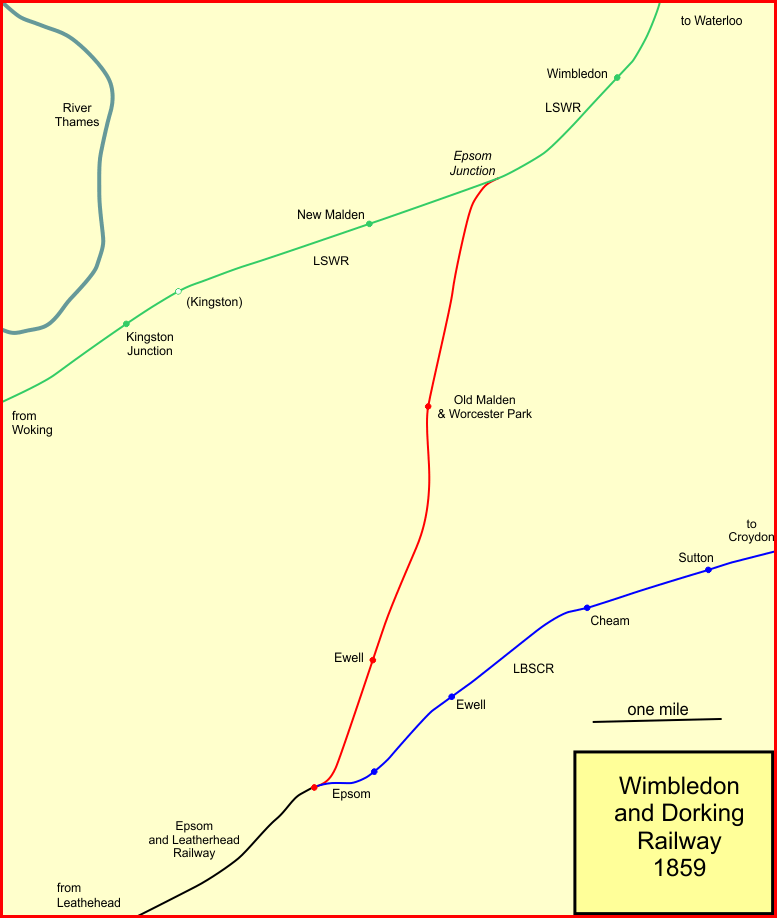
System map of the Wimbledon and Dorking Railway

The London and Croydon Railway was operational in 1839, and by means of an affiliated company, the Croydon and Epsom Railway, had powers granted on 29 July 1844 to reach Epsom. The London and Croydon Railway amalgamated with the London and Brighton Railway and the Croydon and Epsom Railway, as well as certain others, resulting in the formation of the London, Brighton and South Coast Railway (LBSCR), by the London and Brighton Railway Act 1846 (9 & 10 Vict. c. cclxxxii) of 27 July 1846.

The Croydon and Epsom line opened to Epsom on 10 May 1847. The Epsom station was some way east of the present-day station, on the north side of Upper High Street.

=== Epsom and Leatherhead Railway ===
On 14 July 1856 the Epsom and Leatherhead Railway was authorised by the Epsom and Leatherhead Railway Act 1856 (19 & 20 Vict. c. xcii), with authorised share capital of £30,000. An independent short line, it had suffered antagonistic opposition in Parliament, which prevented it from extending at either end. The E&LR had no large company sponsoring it, and its supporters were free to secure the support of the LBSCR or the LSWR. The E&LR was completed on 1 February 1859 and worked by the LSWR. For a short time it was isolated from other railways.

=== Wimbledon and Dorking Railway ===
Wimbledon and Dorking Railway Act 1857
- Act of Parliament
- Parliament of the United Kingdom
- Long title: An Act for making a Railway from the London and South-western Railway at Wimbledon to Epsom; and for other Purposes.
- Citation: 20 & 21 Vict. c. lxxii

Dates
- Royal assent: 27 July 1857

Text of statute as originally enacted

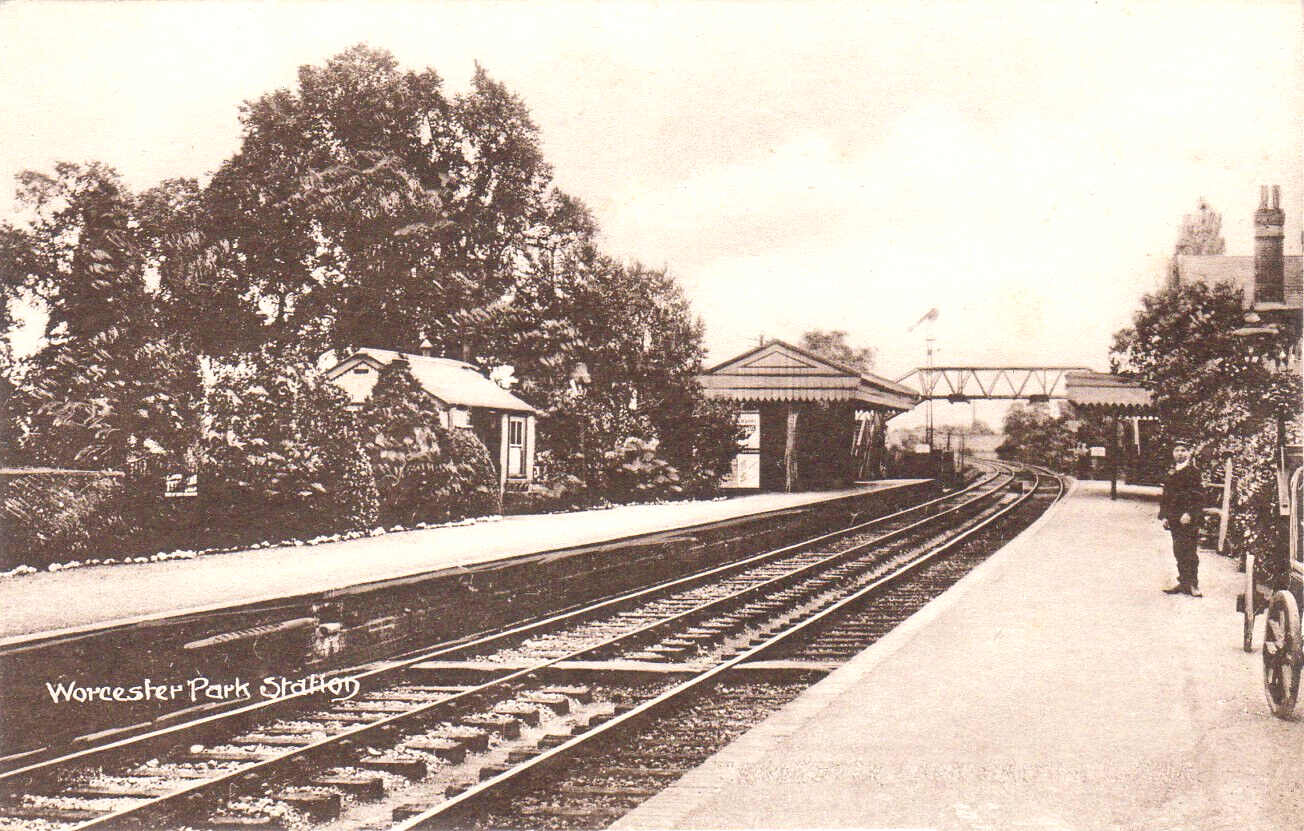
Worcester park station

Independent promoters put forward a Wimbledon and Dorking Railway, intended to extend the E&LR at each end. It would leave the LSWR main line west of Wimbledon, and run to Epsom, and then from Leatherhead to Dorking. The first prospectus showed a connection at Dorking to the South Eastern Railway, which ran west to east between Guildford and Reigate. However the W&DR parliamentary bill in the 1857 session applied only for the northern section, 5 3/4 miles long. The Wimbledon and Dorking Railway Act 1857 (20 & 21 Vict. c. lxxii) was passed on 27 July 1857; the authorised share capital was £70.000. The LSWR had opposed at first, but was mollified by an agreement that it should work and maintain the line for forty-five per cent of gross receipts, taking £30,000 in shares and appointing two directors.

The LSWR had made a territorial exclusivity agreement several years previously: each agreed not to make or encourage lines that encroached into the other's natural territory, and when the E&LR asked the LSWR to work its line, the LSWR primly refused. The W&DR did not enter into the disputed territory, and was falling into the LSWR camp, but a proposed amalgamation of the W&DR and the ELR would infringe the agreement, and the LSWR opposed a 1858 bill proposing that amalgamation.

The W&DR double line, surveyed by Crosse, was built by Thomas Brassey, though bad weather and scarcity of men and materials made him late with both. The W&DR line was opened to traffic on 4 April 1859; the junction with the LSWR main line was named Epsom Junction, and was located at the site of the later Raynes Park station. Like the E&LR, the line was worked by the LSWR.

In 1859 the W&DR owning company made an alliance with the Epsom and Leatherhead Railway and the proposed Portsmouth Direct Railway, intending to extend from Leatherhead to Dorking, and ultimately Portsmouth via Chichester, but this project was turned down by Parliament in 1859. On 29 July 1859 the LBSCR reached an agreement settling further territorial disputes; part of the agreement left the LBSCR in sole possession of the area south of Leatherhead, and the aspirations of the W&DR to extend in that direction were at an end.

=== Epsom stations ===
On 8 August 1859 the Epsom station of the LBSCR was connected to the E&LR and LBSCR trains worked through on to that line. The Wimbledon line had a passenger train service of seven trains every weekday.

=== Absorption of the WDR ===
In 1860 the W&DR complained bitterly that its legitimate income was restricted because of diversion of traffic by the LBSCR. The LSWR decided it was time to buy out the W&DR and made an offer, but it was turned down by W&DR shareholders. The W&DR had a short section of line at Epsom, which the LBSCR used to reach the E&LR and the W&DR started proceedings in the High Court to prevent the LBSCR using it. Further petulant measures followed, but at length it was obvious that the future involved a takeover by the LSWR, and this was agreed from 3 April 1861.

The LSWR absorbed the W&DR by the South Western Railway (Additional Powers) Act 1862 (25 & 26 Vict. c. xlii) of 3 June 1862.

=== Train service ===
The 1904 timetables show 22 down trains to Epsom.

=== Raynes Park station and junction ===
A station opened at Epsom Junction, where the W&DR converged with the LSWR main line. It was called Raynes Park, and its opening date was 30 October 1871. AT first it served only the Epsom line and the Kingston line. This was followed on 16 March 1884 by the commissioning of a burrowing junction there, by which the Up Epsom line was carried under the main lines to avoid conflicts.

=== Electrification ===
Surrey's first section of the Southern Electric came into operation on 12 July 1925, running over the lines from Raynes Park to Epsom and Dorking. The third rail direct current system was used.

== Chessington branch ==
Much later the line was the basis for the Chessington branch from Motspur Park (itself a later addition) to Chessington South. That was the last line built by the Southern Railway, opened on 28 May 1938 to Tolworth and to Chessington South on 29 May 1939. The branch was originally planned to continue to Leatherhead with stations at Malden Rushett and Ashtead, but war intervened, and apart from some preliminary civil engineering west of Chessington South station the scheme was never built.

== Passenger train services ==
The Raynes Park to Epsom line links the South West Main Line to several routes through Surrey. As of 2020 it is used for the following weekday off-peak services by South Western Railway from London Waterloo:

- Waterloo to Chessington South
- Waterloo to Guildford via Epsom
- Waterloo to Dorking via Epsom

Epsom also has Southern services from London Victoria and London Bridge, providing connections beyond Dorking to Horsham and back to Sutton and South London.

== Locations ==
- Epsom Junction;
- Raynes Park; opened 30 October 1871; still open;
- Motspur Park; opened 12 July 1925; still open;
- Old Malden and Worcester Park; opened 4 April 1859; renamed Worcester Park 1862; still open;
- Stoneleigh; opened 17 July 1932; still open;
- Ewell; opened 4 April 1859; renamed Ewell West 9 July 1923;
- Epsom; open 1 February 1859; still open.
