= Bookham railway station =

Railway station in Surrey, England

Coordinates: 51°17′20″N 0°23′02″W

Bookham
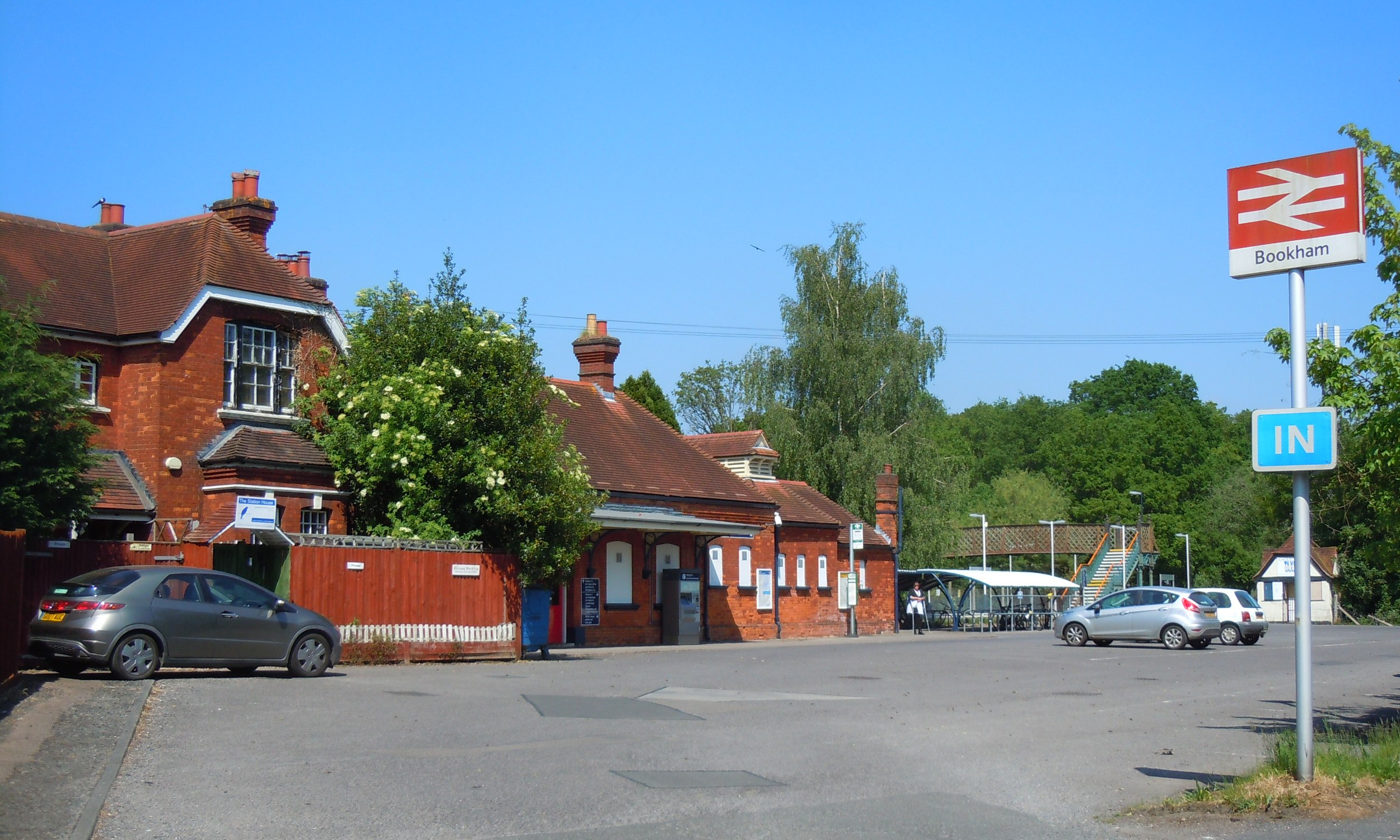

General information
- Location: Great Bookham, District of Mole Valley; England
- Grid reference: TQ127556
- Manager: South Western Railway
- Platforms: 2

Other information
- Station code: BKA
- Classification: DfT category E

History
- Opened: 1885

Passengers
- 2020/21: ▼45,452
- 2021/22: ▲0.134 million
- 2022/23: ▲0.168 million
- 2023/24: ▲0.198 million
- 2024/25: ▲0.212 million
Location
Notes
- Passenger statistics from the Office of Rail and Road

Bookham railway station is in the village of Great Bookham in Surrey, England. It also serves the adjacent village of Little Bookham. It is 20 miles 45 chains (33.1 km) down the line from London Waterloo.

The station is managed by South Western Railway, which operates all train services.

== History ==
Bookham railway station was opened on 2 February 1885; the line at the time was owned by the London and South Western Railway.

Initially the London and South Western Railway wanted to build the line into the centre of Great Bookham village itself, but as often happened in those early days of rail expansion from London, the key landowners (and villagers) were strongly opposed to that idea and forced the company to adopt a much more northerly route, resulting in the station being built nearly one mile (1.6 km) from the village high street in open country.

It effectively remained in an open-field setting until the later 1950s/early 1960s when there was a massive expansion of the village, with new estates built to fill the space between the high street and station, leaving only National Trust-owned land as a "green corridor" along parts of Church Road.

The station buildings remain largely unchanged to this day, including the footbridge and platform canopies, however, the station master's house has been sold off as a private dwelling.

Immediately to the west of the station the original goods siding was removed in the 1960s and the associated goods shed (used as a coal depot by local businessman Howard Weale at that time) was finally demolished in the 1990s having lived on for a time as a builder's yard (Tredan) and then offices.

There are now scant landmarks to identify it as the original siding and goods yard. The siding area was for a period home to a blacksmith, but that land was sold for housing development, and where the shed once stood is now a purpose-built office block.

In 2024, the station received upgrades as part of a £6,3 million upgrade of 13 stations in Surrey served by South Western Railway, including refurbished toilets with new accessible ones, new benches and waiting shelters, and fresh painting of the station.

== Services ==
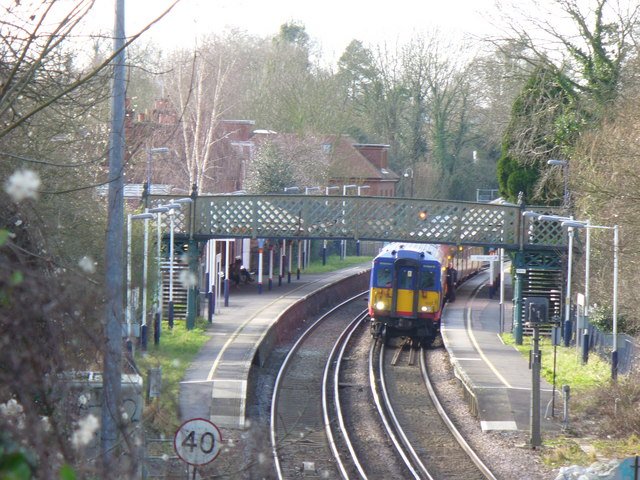
Bookham railway station

All services at Bookham are operated by South Western Railway.

The typical off-peak service in trains per hour is:

- 1 tph to London Waterloo via Epsom
- 1 tph to Guildford

Additional services run during the peak hours, increasing the service to 2 tph in each direction.

Preceding station	National Rail	Following station
Leatherhead	South Western Railway Mole Valley Line	Effingham Junction
