= Horsham, Dorking and Leatherhead Railway =

UK railway line

The Horsham, Dorking and Leatherhead Railway (HD&LR) was an early railway company in southern England. It planned to fill in a gap in the network of the London, Brighton and South Coast Railway, shortening the route from London to coastal towns from Littlehampton to Portsmouth. It only obtained authorisation to build from Horsham to Dorking, and it sold its company to the LBSCR, which completed the construction, and itself built the remaining section from Dorking to Leatherhead.

It opened in 1867, and the LBSCR transferred through trains to this shorter route, relieving the congested main line. It was electrified from Leatherhead to Dorking in 1925 as part of the Southern Railway's outer suburban electrification scheme, and in 1938 the rest of the line was electrified, completing the route to the coast. A new regular interval service of fast trains was commercially successful.

The through fast trains were diverted to the Three Bridges route from 1978, and the line now carries only local passenger trains.

== History ==
=== Horsham branch from Three Bridges ===
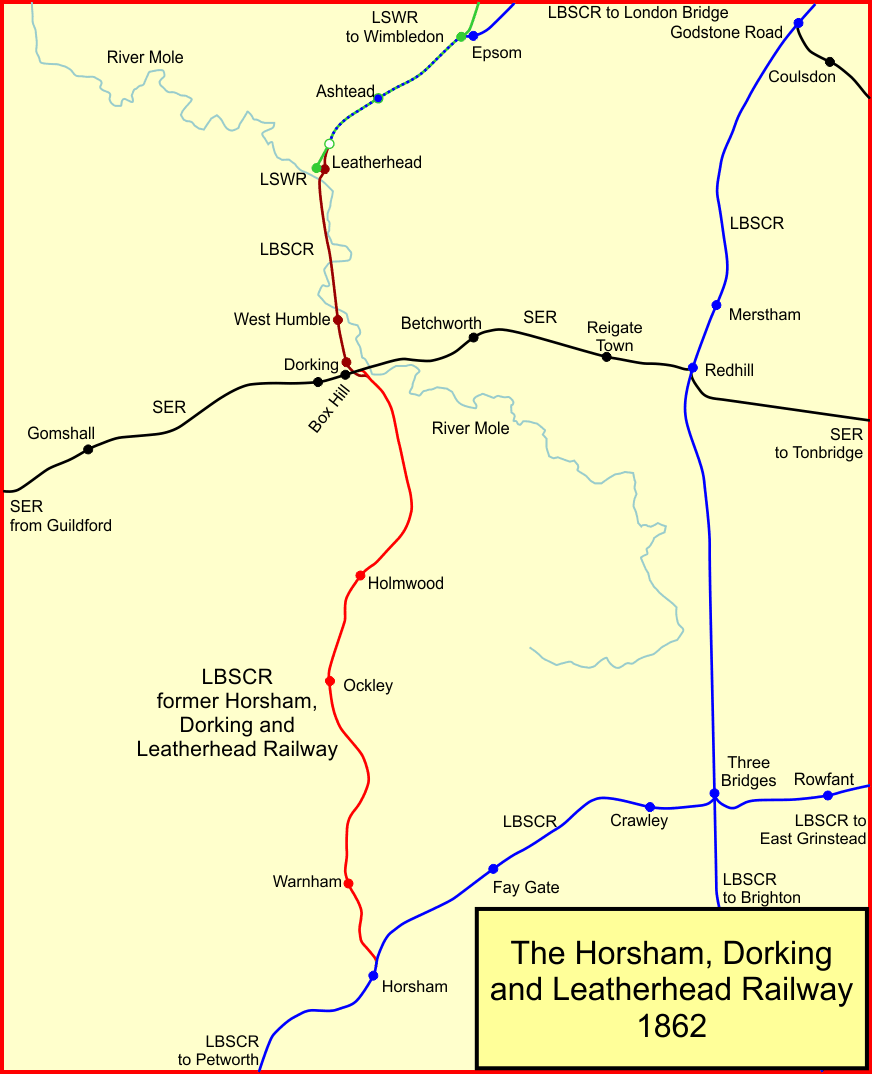
The Leatherhead to Horsham railway

The London and Brighton Railway was authorised to build a direct line through Three Bridges, and it opened in 1841. Its trains used the London and Croydon Railway at the north end of the route. During the planning stage, one possible route would have run through Horsham, but the route selected ran through Three Bridges instead. A branch line was later constructed to Horsham from Three Bridges, opening on 14 February 1848. The London and Brighton Railway merged with other companies to form the London, Brighton and South Coast Railway on 27 July 1846.

=== Epsom and Leatherhead Railway ===
The Epsom and Leatherhead Railway was built independently; it opened on 1 February 1859. Although at first it was isolated from other lines, it was soon connected to the LBSCR route from London Bridge via Croydon, and the LSWR line from Waterloo via Wimbledon.

=== Horsham to Petworth, and on to Arundel ===
The LBSCR sponsored a local company, the Mid-Sussex Railway, to build a new line from Horsham through Billingshurst and Pulborough to Petworth; the area was agricultural. The line opened on 15 October 1859

The LBSCR realised that the gap from the Petworth line to its own coastal line near Arundel could easily be closed, and a new line about ten miles long was built; it ran from Hardham Junction just south of Pulborough to the Arundel station, now named Ford. It saved ten miles on the journey from London to Chichester, Littlehampton and Portsmouth. The new line was described as the Mid-Sussex Junction Railway.

=== Horsham, Leatherhead and Dorking Railway ===
Horsham, Dorking, and Leatherhead Railway Act 1862
- Act of Parliament
- Parliament of the United Kingdom
- Long title: An Act for making a Railway from Horsham to Dorking, and for other Purposes.
- Citation: 25 & 26 Vict. c. cli

Dates
- Royal assent: 17 July 1862

Text of statute as originally enacted

The completion of the route from Three Bridges through Horsham and Pulborough to Arundel and beyond was a considerable boost to the LBSCR’s traffic, shortening the route. Independent promoters observed that the route from London to Horsham was rather roundabout, and subject to congestion on the double track main line. If the gap between Leatherhead and Horsham were closed, a new, more direct route would be formed. An independent company, the Horsham, Dorking and Leatherhead Railway was promoted to build such a line, and it gained its authorisation by the Horsham, Dorking, and Leatherhead Railway Act 1862 (25 & 26 Vict. c. cli) of 17 July 1862.

A Railway commencing in the Parish of Horsham in the County of Sussex by a Junction with the London, Brighton, and South Coast Railway at or near the Horsham Station thereon, and terminating in the Parish of Dorking in the County of Surrey by a Junction with the Reading, Guildford, and Reigate Line of the South-eastern Railway Company at or near the Boxhill Station thereon: Provided that, in constructing the Railway between the Properties in the Parish of Capel, numbered 69 and 93 respectively on the Plan deposited on the said Seventh Day of April One thousand eight hundred and sixty-two, the Company shall not make any Deviation of the Centre Line of the Railway to the Eastward of that shown on the Plan deposited as aforesaid without the written Consent of Thomas Lambert Esquire, or other the Owner or Owners for the Time being of Greenhurst Farmhouse in the said Parish of Capel. — Section 19, Horsham, Dorking, and Leatherhead Railway Act 1862 (25 & 26 Vict. c. cli)

Notwithstanding the company's title, the authorisation was for a line from Horsham to Dorking only. The South Eastern Railway was established at Dorking, having opened its east-west line there in July (west from Dorking) and August (from Dorking to Redhill) 1849, by means of an affiliate company, the Reading, Guildford and Reigate Railway. The northern extremity of the HD&LR was a junction with the SER line enabling the Horsham trains to reach the Dorking station of the SER.

London, Brighton, and South Coast Railway (Dorking to Leatherhead) Act 1863
- Act of Parliament
- Parliament of the United Kingdom
- Long title: An Act to enable the London, Brighton, and South Coast Railway Company to make a Railway from Dorking to Leatherhead; and for other Purposes.
- Citation: 26 & 27 Vict. c. cxxxvii

Dates
- Royal assent: 13 July 1863

Text of statute as originally enacted

The LBSCR observed that the HD&LR formed the basis of a useful link between Leatherhead and Horsham, and itself obtained powers to build from Leatherhead to Dorking in the London, Brighton, and South Coast Railway (Dorking to Leatherhead) Act 1863 (26 & 27 Vict. c. cxxxvii), making a junction with the HD&LR.

The LBSCR absorbed the HD&LR company by the London, Brighton and South Coast Railway (Additional Powers) Act 1864 (27 & 28 Vict. c. cccxiv). It provided its own Dorking station and joined the HD&LR route a little south of the connection to the SER. In fact the LBSCR section was completed swiftly, opening on 11 March 1867; there was one intermediate station at Box Hill. (Note: The SER line had a Box Hill station also; it is now called Deepdene.)

The LBSCR absorbed the HD&LR company on 29 July 1864, and completed the construction. The process was made difficult by geological conditions in Betchworth Tunnel, and the line finally opened on 1 May 1867. There were intermediate stations at Warnham, Ockley and Holmwood.

=== Leatherhead and Dorking connections ===
At Leatherhead, the terminal station of the joint Epsom and Leatherhead Railway was identified as inconveniently located for the town, and the LBSCR extended south-westward in preparation for the Dorking line. It opened a new station on 4 March 1867, leaving the joint station in use only by the LSWR for a week. The LSWR were obliged to provide their own new station, separate from but adjacent to the LBSCR station. The LSWR transferred to its new station, and the joint station closed, on 11 March 1867.

At Dorking the curve connecting to the SER line was built, and opened on 1 May 1867 along with the main line, but no regular traffic ever used it. Oppitz says that it was used only once for a race special from Hastings to Epsom. It was removed in 1926, and reinstated in 1941 as a wartime precaution, but removed again after the war.

=== Electrification to Dorking ===
The Southern Railway was formed in 1923 by the forced amalgamation of the LBSCR, the LSWR and other railways, in a process known as the Grouping, following the Railways Act 1921. The LSWR had implemented a widespread network of third-rail dc electrification in the suburban area, and this was considered to be highly satisfactory, and the Southern Railway determined to extend the system. The SR implemented a widespread scheme of electrification of outer suburban routes using the system. This included the line from Epsom to Leatherhead; public operation to Leatherhead started on 12 July 1925; there was a formal opening ceremony on 9 July. The new trains ran to a regular-interval pattern, and two trains per hour ran to Dorking. There were still two separate stations at Leatherhead, a legacy of the prior competition between the LSWR and the LBSCR. From 10 July 1927 the two stations at Leatherhead were re-arranged so that all trains used the former LBSCR station.

=== Electrification to the coast ===
In 1935 it was agreed to electrify the main line from Dorking and Three Bridges to Arundel Junction. The work was the second scheme to be financed under the 1935 arrangement with the Treasury. It was known as the Portsmouth No 2 Scheme, as it followed the No 1 scheme, which was on the Portsmouth Direct line and associated routes. The newly-converted lines made end-on connections with existing electrified routes at Dorking (1925 suburban extension) and Three Bridges (1932/33 Brighton scheme).

The Down bay platform at Dorking North was converted into a loop and resignalled for running in either direction. Colour-light signalling was installed from Mickleham through to Holmwood controlled from a signal box at Dorking. Intermediate signal boxes, such as that at Lodge Farm north of Holmwood, ceased to be block posts.

Work had progressed sufficiently for the first trial trains to run over the newly-electrified lines in May 1938, and in the following month electric stock was used on a number of specials between London Bridge and Bognor Regis. The official opening took place on 30 June 1938, with the usual civic receptions which had become a feature of SR electrification inaugurations. Regular electric services on the sections newly converted commenced on 2 July 1938.

One suburban train each hour from Waterloo to Dorking North via Wimbledon and one train from London Bridge to Dorking North via Mitcham Junction were extended to Horsham, calling at all stations. Additionally, one other Waterloo train was extended as far as Holmwood. As well as local services, there was now an hourly fast train from Victoria to Bognor Regis and Portsmouth, dividing at Barnham, running via Sutton, Epsom and Leatherhead, and making calls at Sutton, Dorking and Horsham. Trains from Waterloo previously terminating at Dorking North were extended to Horsham. In the first six months of the new electric service receipts rose 13%.

== Current operations ==
The Leatherhead to Horsham line is no longer a primary main line, as from 8 May 1978 the Bognor Regis trains have been diverted via Three Bridges, in order to serve Gatwick Airport. The current (December 2022) timetable gives an hourly stopping train from Victoria to Horsham over the Dorking route, with an additional train from Victoria to Dorking and another from Waterloo to Dorking.

== Locations ==
- Leatherhead (Joint Line station); opened 1 February 1859; closed 4 March 1867;
- Leatherhead (LBSCR station); opened 4 March 1867; still open;
- Boxhill; opened 11 March 1867 as West Humble; renamed Box Hill & Burford Bridge 1 November 1870; became Boxhill & Westhumble 15 September 1958; still open;
- Dorking; opened 11 March 1867; renamed Dorking North 1923; reverted to Dorking 10 July 1967;
- Holmwood; opened 1 May 1867; still open;
- Ockley; opened 1 May 1867; Ockley & Capel from 1 July 1869, until 30 March 1887, and from 15 September 1952 until 11 May 1980; still open;
- Warnham; opened 1 May 1867; still open;
- Horsham; opened 14 February 1848;; relocated when Mid-Sussex line southwards opened on 10 October 1859; still open.
