= Croydon and Epsom Railway =

The Croydon and Epsom Railway was an early railway in southern England running between the two Surrey towns mentioned in its name. The company was formed March 1844 to operate a new line using the atmospheric principle. However, before its line was opened it was amalgamated with other companies to form the London, Brighton and South Coast Railway (LB&SCR) on 27 July 1846.

== History ==
=== Plans ===
The early success of the London and Croydon Railway (LCR) encouraged its directors to form a new independent company to continue the line to Epsom. This was approved by shareholders at a meeting on 7 March 1844. The railway was then experimenting in the use of atmospheric propulsion and decided to use the Samuel Clegg and Jacob and Joseph Samuda system patented in 1838. However, difficulties in acquiring suitable land meant that the line was not completed in 1846 as originally planned.

=== Merger ===
The company was merged with others to form the London, Brighton and South Coast Railway (LB&SCR) on 27 July 1846 before the line was completed. The railway opened to the public 10 May 1847, but by that time atmospheric working had been abandoned by the new company.
