= Stoneleigh, Surrey =

Coordinates: 51.36377°N 0.24900°W

Stoneleigh
- Location within Surrey
- Area: 1.5 sq mi (3.9 km^{2})
- Population: 9,409 (2025 census)
  - Density: 6,273/sq mi (2,422/km^{2})
- OS grid reference: TQ2264
  - London: 11.3 mi (18.2 km) NNE
- District: Epsom and Ewell
- Shire county: Surrey
- Region: South East
- Country: England
- Sovereign state: United Kingdom
- Post town: EPSOM
- Postcode district: KT17 and KT19
- Post town: WORCESTER PARK
- Postcode district: KT4
- Dialling code: 020
- Police: Surrey
- Fire: Surrey
- Ambulance: South East Coast
- UK Parliament: Epsom & Ewell

Stoneleigh is a suburban area southwest of London, in Epsom and Ewell borough, Surrey, having a northern border with London. (Note: A few streets are in the London Borough of Sutton) It is centred 11 miles (18 km) from central London. It approximates to two wards: Auriol which had an estimated 4,447 residents in 2025, and Stoneleigh (on the other side of the central railway) which had an estimated 4,962 residents that year. (Note: Residents as electors elect one councillor to each, see File:Epsom_and_Ewell_UK_ward_map_2023.svg.)

The area was part of "the Great Park" and "Little Park" of Nonsuch (formerly Cuddington) in Tudor England. Nonsuch Park today amounts to almost all the original Little Park at Stoneleigh's southeast end, extending into East Ewell and Cheam.

The construction of the railway station, in 1932, incepted the surburban streets and parks forming today's Stoneleigh. Housing on these streets was largely completed by the onset of World War II in late 1939.

== History ==
1805 map of the area. Stoneleigh is now around "Cold Harbour" and "Sparrow" farms (just left of centre).

Map of the contributory parishes and buildings of 1870s (with today's Stoneleigh which did not exist marked roughly in grey) (colour-coded by parish). Stoneleigh has a rail station-based extent as it lacks a closely matching ward and a post town

=== Early history ===
The Roman road Stane Street forms the eastern fringe of what is now Stoneleigh (becoming the modern day London Road/A24) on its way from London to Chichester via the nearby spring at Ewell and Mole Gap (taking such a course avoiding steepest parts of the North Downs and Greensand Ridge). Between the early 16th and early 18th century, today's "Stoneleigh" was, if cutting the west half from 'Auriol' ward and a tiny slither of Cheam in th east then all within and just short of the north end of the Great Park of Nonsuch Palace. In 1731 the Nonsuch estate was sold off and the Great Park, by then known as Worcester Park was divided up and reverted to farms.

Bowling Green and Coldharbour farms in the north of the park were run jointly and in 1860 were acquired by John Jeffries Stone. He had a large house he called 'Stoneleigh', close to the Bowling Green Farmhouse, which gave its name to the district (a map published in 1871 names a cluster of buildings between Elmwood Drive and Ewell Park Way as "Bowling Green Farm", one of 1897 names them "Stoneleigh").

In 1859 the London and South Western Railway opened the Wimbledon and Epsom Line, passing through Stoneleigh. The commuter station opened 60 years later. Farming here reached the full state it had before Henry VIII's takeover of the land - at the start of the 20th century Stoneleigh or northern Cuddington as a whole comprised nearly twenty farms, but the number reduced rapidly after the First World War, as there was great demand for housing it became profitable to sell off the farmland for development.

In 1911 Stoneleigh also had a brick, tile, and pottery works: the "Nonsuch Works" and two flour mills. In 1915 only London Road (A24) contained homes, which could be found along the length of Nonsuch Park, although most were close to the large 'Stoneleigh' house.

=== Later history ===
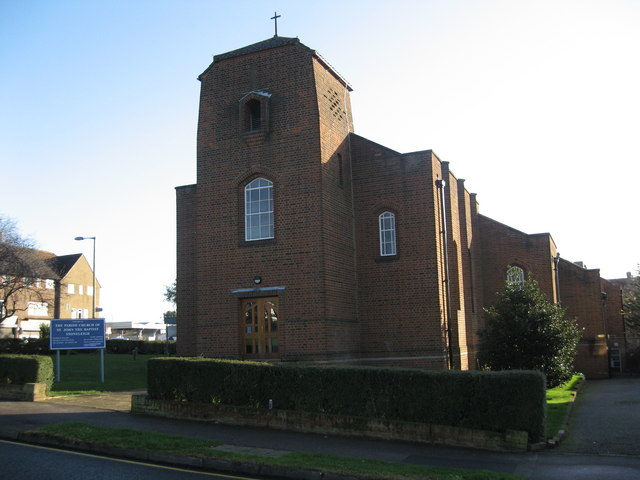
St John the Baptist Church, Stoneleigh

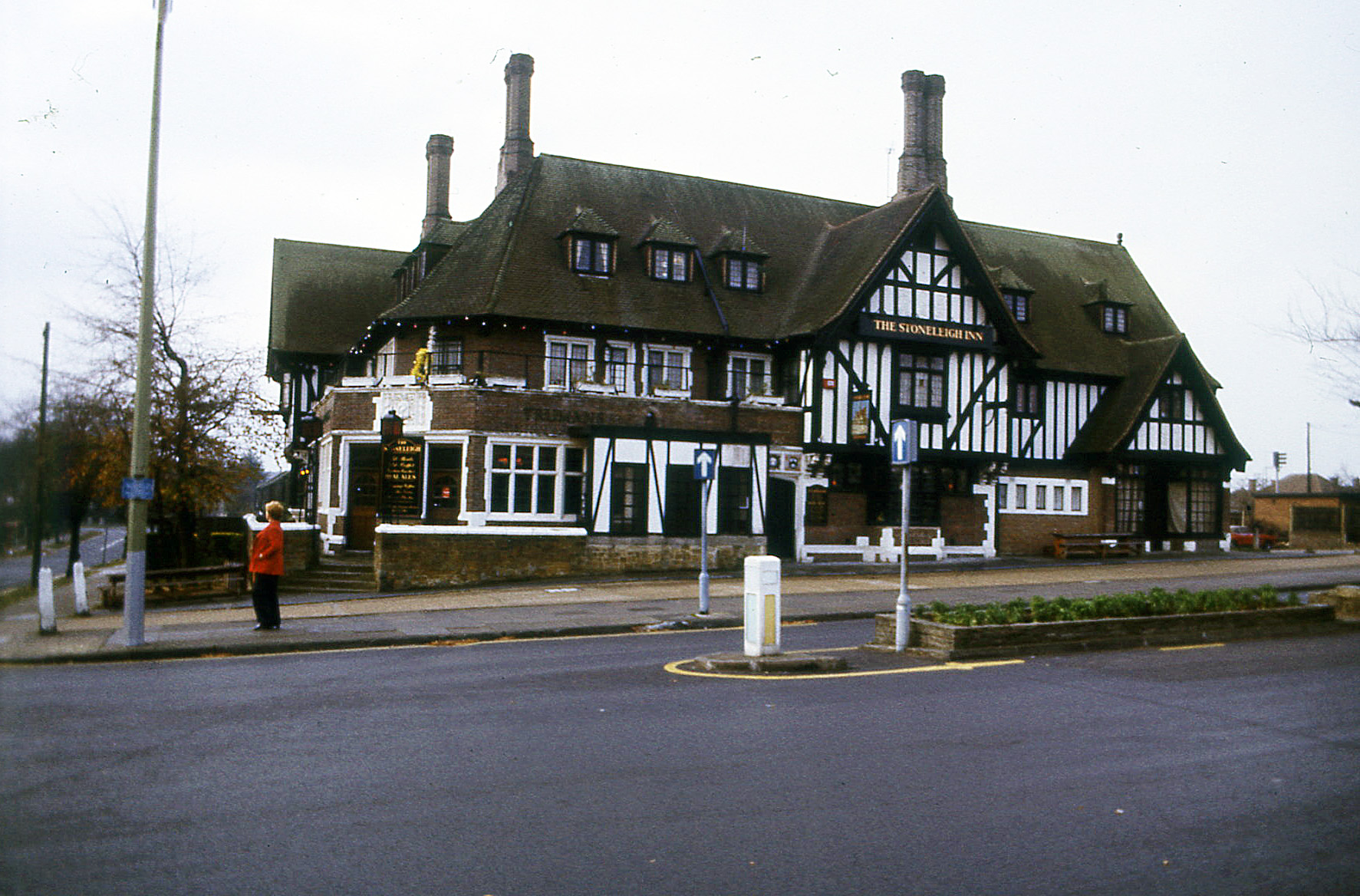
Stoneleigh Inn, beginning of the 1980s

In Interwar Britain, demand for housing on commuter routes into London meant the area grew rapidly. A map of 1931 colours the land mostly as "Meadowland and permanent grass" with patches of "Forest and woodland" and "Heathland, moorland, commons and rough pasture".

Stoneleigh railway station was opened in July 1932, on land of "Stoneleigh Park" estate in July 1931. It was originally to be named 'Stoneleigh Park' to denote local market gardening, but this did not happen, probably due to the next three stations on the line all suffixed 'Park' (Worcester Park, Motspur Park and Raynes Park). Some of which had medieval, Tudor or Stuart licences to impark.

The first houses were built in 1933 and the first shops on Stoneleigh Broadway opened in November of the same year. The Stoneleigh Hotel, now listed, opened in November 1935 and additional shops were built on the Broadway in the late 1930s.

In 1938, Stoneleigh Methodist church was completed, the same year that the Rembrandt cinema opened next to the railway line on the Kingston Road. The cinema operated for 60 years until its closure in April 1998. The building was subsequently demolished and replaced by flats. The red-brick Anglican church of St John the Baptist, next to the station, was built in 1939. Two large schools (Stoneleigh East and West) were built in Stoneleigh in the 1930s to accommodate the large suburban growth in the area. These schools still exist under different names.

The vast majority of the Stoneleigh area had been built on before construction was halted by the onset of World War II in late 1939, with almost all the new homes being semi-detached. A small section in the northwest of Stoneleigh Broadway was built in the 1960s. Additionally, an area in the far north of Stoneleigh was developed into housing around this time following the closure of the Worcester Park Brick Works.

== Geography ==
Stoneleigh comprises the residential areas either side of the Mole Valley Line including Stoneleigh Broadway towards its midpoint, which is 2.8 miles (4.5 km) from Epsom town centre. The suburb has no high rise buildings. It contains or borders two mostly dual carriageway primary A roads; the A240 Kingston Road and Ewell Bypass in both the Auriol and Stoneleigh wards, and the A24 in the Stoneleigh ward, from the Organ Crossroads to the traffic lights with Sparrow Farm Road, via Nonsuch Park, near where Stane Street used to be.

Stoneleigh is associated with an area extending as far as the Kingston Road (A240) in the west, The Organ Crossroads to the south, Nonsuch Park in the southeast, Sparrow Farm Road to the northeast and Timbercroft and Auriol Park to the northwest. Auriol Park, for example, is in the Auriol Ward but is in the KT4, Worcester Park, postcode area.

=== Topography ===
The Ewell Court Stream of the Hogsmill River runs through Stoneleigh, rising in Nonsuch Park. It runs underground throughout Briarwood Road and Stoneleigh Park Road before re-emerging at the nearby Ewell Court Lake. The Beverley Brook's source is at the extreme north of the suburb at Sparrow Farm Road before it flows into Worcester Park through Cuddington Recreation Ground.

Ordance Survey maps show the land sits between 25 and 52 metres above sea level, peaking in Stoneleigh Crescent just north-west of Stoneleigh Station and dropping to 25 metres in the extreme west at Timbercroft/Salisbury Road. The high point is a summit between the Ewell Court Stream, the Beverley Brook and the Hogsmill River, with the low near to the Hogsmill. The cente of the suburb (Stoneleigh Broadway) is at about 37 metres on a gentle incline just north of the Ewell Court Stream.

== Surrounding area ==
Stoneleigh is contiguous with Ewell, Worcester Park and North Cheam; its main green or blue buffer is Nonsuch Park.

== Demography and housing ==
At the time of the 2001 census, Stoneleigh Ward had a population of 4,700, an increase of 3.6% from 1991, with 2,378 females and 2,322 males. Auriol Ward is the smallest in the Borough with a population of 3,687 in the 2001 Census, a decrease of 19% from 1991, with 1,858 females and 1,829 males. This decrease in population is because of the area lost to the Ewell Court ward, where the population increased by 19%. In 2023, this area was regained from Ewell Court back to Auriol, simultaneously to the creation of the new Horton Ward in the west of the borough.

Population change
Year	Stoneleigh	Auriol	Total
2001	4,700	3,687	8,387
2011	4,809	3,932	8,741

2011 Census Homes
Ward	Detached	Semi-detached	Terraced	Flats and apartments	Caravans/temporary/mobile homes/houseboats	Shared between households
Auriol	239	1,376	28	148	0	0
Stoneleigh	172	1,213	30	97	0	0

2011 Census Households
Ward	Population	Households	% Owned outright	% Owned with a loan	hectares
Auriol	3,932	1,512	46.4	45	92
Stoneleigh	4,809	1,791	44.8	44.9	101

== Parks and open spaces ==
A western tranche of Nonsuch Park was in Cuddington the near part of which has become Stoneleigh, including the wooded area around the Stoneleigh Swamp. The rest lay in East Ewell and Cheam, the latter being in Greater London hence the park straddles London and Surrey. Auriol Park is in the north west of Stoneleigh with a playground, tennis and basketball courts in addition to football pitches.

== Economy ==
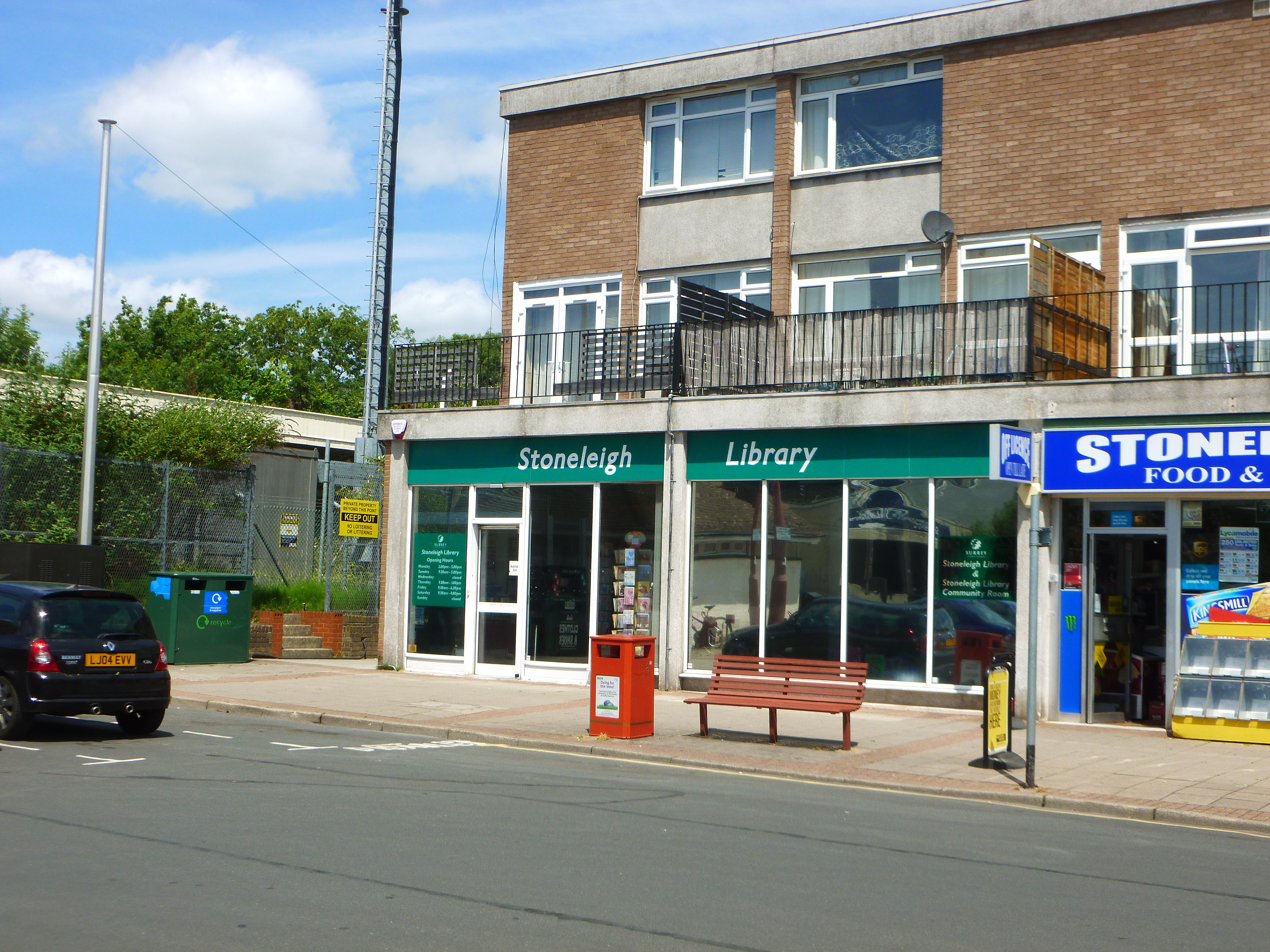
Stoneleigh Library

In public-facing businesses foremost is Stoneleigh Broadway, next to Stoneleigh railway station, is about 280 yards (260 m) long and has around 40 retail units including convenience stores and restaurants, as well as a post office and two pubs. Recent supermarkets comprise Co-Op and Sainsbury's. Stoneleigh Library opened in 1966. It has been run by volunteers since 2013. Stoneleigh also has smaller parades and shopping areas including:

- Stoneleigh and Kingston Parades are where Stoneleigh Park Road meets the A240 Kingston Road, at the south-west border – with a post office opposite..
- Cunliffe Parade, Vale Road, has a post office and a convenience store facing the Willow Tree pub-restaurant, on the northern border.

=== The Organ Inn ===
The Organ Inn was a landmark pub on the southern boundary junction of Stoneleigh where the A24, A240 and B2200 roads intersect. It opened in the 1780s as the drinking place of the workmen who fitted the Father Willis organ in St Mary's Church in Ewell. It was later converted into a bar/restaurant, firstly under the name Jim Thompsons and finally The Organ and Dragon.

The pub closed on 18 July 2012 after around 230 years of business. The building was demolished in June 2014 after supermarket chain Lidl bought the site. The demolishing of the Organ and Dragon was criticized by local MP Chris Grayling. Kentucky Fried Chicken had previously owned the site and had unsuccessfully applied for planning permission to turn it into one of their restaurants .

== Transport ==
Stoneleigh railway station is served by South Western Railway trains running between London Waterloo and Guildford or Dorking, via Wimbledon and Epsom.

Three bus routes go either through or along the edge of Stoneleigh. The E16 (Stoneleigh Circular) stops at both Station Approach and Stoneleigh Broadway along its circular route, which also runs through Epsom, Ewell and Worcester Park. The 406 bus (between Kingston and Epsom) runs along the A240 past Park Avenue West, Stoneleigh Park Road and Thorndon Gardens and the 293 bus (between Morden and Epsom) runs along the A24 (London Road) alongside Nonsuch Park.

== Education ==
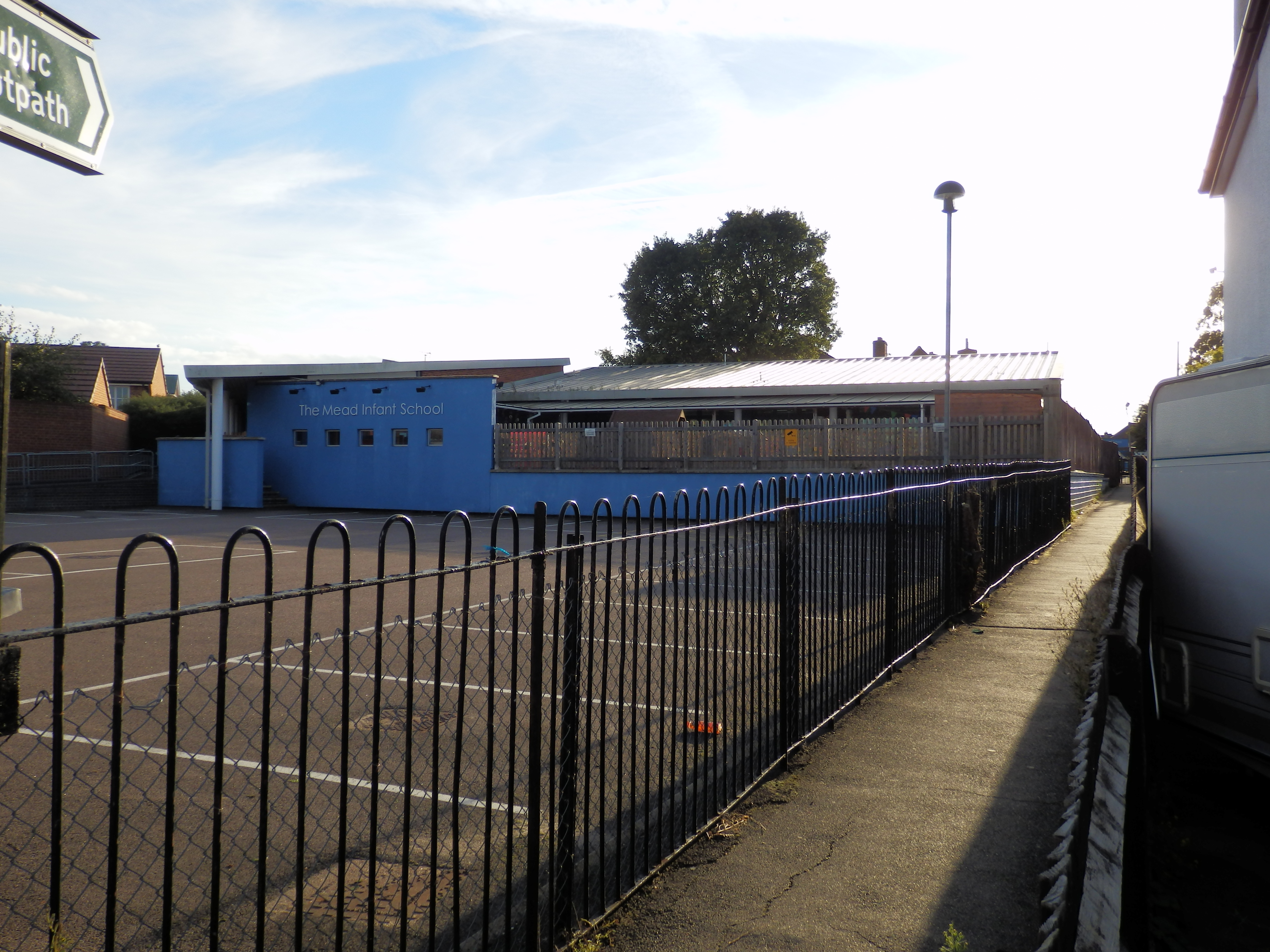
The Mead Infant School

There are four schools in Stoneleigh: the Mead Infant School and Auriol Junior School are in the Auriol Ward, with Nonsuch Primary School and Meadow Primary School in the Stoneleigh Ward. No secondary schools exist in Stoneleigh, with most students travelling to schools in Epsom, Ewell, Tolworth and Cheam.

The Mead Infant School on Newbury Gardens is for children from nursery year to school year 2 (ages 3–7). It is adjacent to Auriol Junior School on Vale Road which caters for children in school years 3 to 6 (ages 7–11).

The two schools in the Stoneleigh Ward are both Primary Schools, catering for children up to school year 6 (3–11 years old). Meadow Primary School on Sparrow Farm Road was formed by the merger of Stoneleigh First School and Sparrow Farm Junior School. Nonsuch Primary School on Chadacre Road is funded by Sutton Council though is narrowly in Surrey.

== Notable people ==
Playwright John Osborne lived at 68 Stoneleigh Park Road. His grandparents lived at the end of Clandon Close. He recounted his experiences as an adolescent living in 1930s and 1940s Stoneleigh and Ewell in his 1981 autobiography, A Better Class of Person.

In the 1950s and 1960s, variety performer Bob Pearson lived in the area with his wife Vera.

Writer Jane Wilson-Howarth lived in Stoneleigh and was educated at Stoneleigh East County Infants, Junior and Secondary Schools.

== See also ==
- List of places of worship in Epsom and Ewell
