= A240 road =

Road in Surrey and Greater London

A240

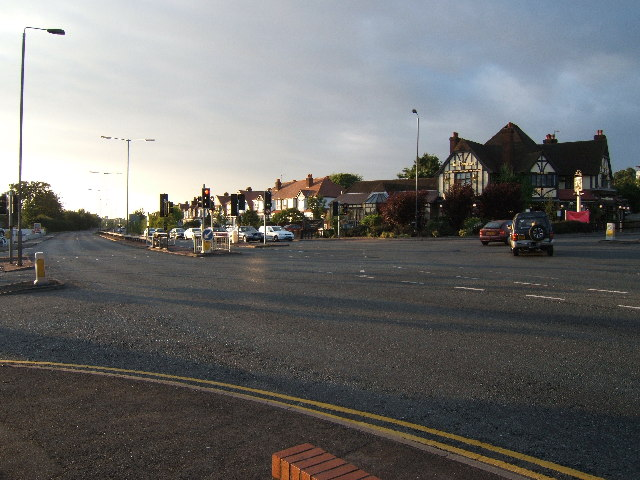
- The junction with the A24.

Route information
- Length: 8.5 mi (13.7 km)

Major junctions
- South East end: Burgh Heath, Surrey
- A217 A2022; A24 A232; A3 A3210 A307
- North West end: Kingston-upon-Thames

Location
- Country: United Kingdom

Road network
- Roads in the United Kingdom; Motorways; A and B road zones
← A239	→ A242

The A240 is a partially primary status A road in Surrey and Greater London that connects the A217 with the A3 and continues beyond through Surbiton to Kingston upon Thames. The road is 8.5 miles (13.7 km) long and is dualled as the Ewell bypass and thereafter to Tolworth Broadway. In conjunction with the A3 it provides an alternative to the congested A24 corridor through Morden and Merton.

== Route ==
The A240 runs through three boroughs. Starting in Burgh Heath (Reigate and Banstead); most of its course is a direct route skirting Ewell and Stoneleigh (Epsom and Ewell) and its finishing section through Tolworth, Surbiton and the south of Kingston in the Royal Borough of Kingston upon Thames the A240's Greater London borough.

=== Reigate and Banstead ===
Branching off the A217 on at Burgh Heath, at the north of a plateau of the North Downs at 178m OD, the road descends northwest passing the large village of Great Burgh or Epsom Downs as a single carriageway primary road, through traffic-lit crossroad junctions with the suburban B2221 (Tattenham Way and Great Tattenhams) .

The B2221 (Note: Yew Tree Bottom Road) branches off and after there is a junction for Yew Tree Bottom Road (B284) from the west. Despite the rural nature of the road here with few houses and rarely any pedestrians, the speed limit is a ridiculous 30 mph, reduced from 40 in 2001. The driving speed of the road is 50 mph up and 40 down. However, speed camera and mobile speed trap in the area helps to enforce the speed limit. Just after the A240 meets the A2022 from the east; it crosses the Sutton and Mole Valley Epsom Downs branch line immediately before exiting the borough.

=== Epsom and Ewell ===
The road enters the Borough of Epsom and Ewell just before A2022 heads west into Epsom at a roundabout. The speed limit rises to 40 mph for about a mile. The A240 continues on its descent through a short stretch of tree-lined open space including the grounds of NESCOT, the route resumes its tree-lined suburban street verges in the highest outskirts of Ewell. The area around Nescot was reduced to 30 mph in 2009 following a series of near misses and accidents outside the college.

At the bottom of this incline the elevation reaches 45m OD and the A24 joins from the southwest. After meeting the A24 the gradient slows it runs concurrently with the A24 road as the Ewell Bypass and becomes a dual carriageway. The bypass shortly afterwards meets the B2200 at the crossroads with the start of the A232. At the next crossroads, the A24 heads off north-east, when meeting the B2200 again, whilst the bypass continues, as the A240 north-west and is the boundary between Ewell and Stoneleigh.

It becomes Kingston Road at the Beggars Hill Roundabout with Park Avenue West heading east into Stoneleigh, passing near to the Gurteen Recreation Ground. The road then goes under the railway line near Stoneleigh railway station with the Ewell Court neighbourhood to the west. The road then passes Stoneleigh Park Road traffic lights, for the railway station, or Bradford Drive, and Thorndon Gardens traffic lights. See traffic mentioned below.

The road bisects a northern spur of West Ewell where it meets the B284, again, at Ruxley Lane. The B284 then branches off at the next junction on Worcester Park Road just before non-humped Tolworth Court Bridge over the Hogsmill stream.

=== Greater London ===
The A240 then enters the Royal Borough of Kingston upon Thames in Greater London as it goes over the Hogsmill River, a tributary of the River Thames at Tolworth Court Bridge. It then goes under another railway bridge by Tolworth railway station before crossing the A3 at the Tolworth Junction, a grade separated roundabout, which the A3 takes uninterrupted. In rush hour, traffic jams from Tolworth junction can stretch to the junction with Thorndon Gardens.

Now as a non-primary road and a single carriageway road again, the A240 continues north-west as commercial Tolworth Broadway passing a well-known landmark, Tolworth Tower, before becoming longer Ewell Road which gently ascends from 24 to 32m where it crosses the South West Main Line northeast of Surbiton railway station. The road turns north-by-northwest with the tangent before this bend being a short link road (A3210) the first of three straight roads to central Surbiton.

In north Surbiton it winds downhill quickly between has two junctions with roads that form the B3363 to central Surbiton. From then on it heads straight towards the B3365, the link road to the A307 where the road bends to the north. It passes County Hall and Kingston University (Penrhyn Road) as the road approaches its end at a roundabout by Kingston College and the Hogsmill River in Kingston town centre.

Bus lanes are incorporated in the Greater London section between the junction with the A3 and its terminus at Kingston.

== Notes and references ==
Notes

Citations
