= Dorking Deepdene railway station =

Railway station in Surrey, England

Dorking Deepdene
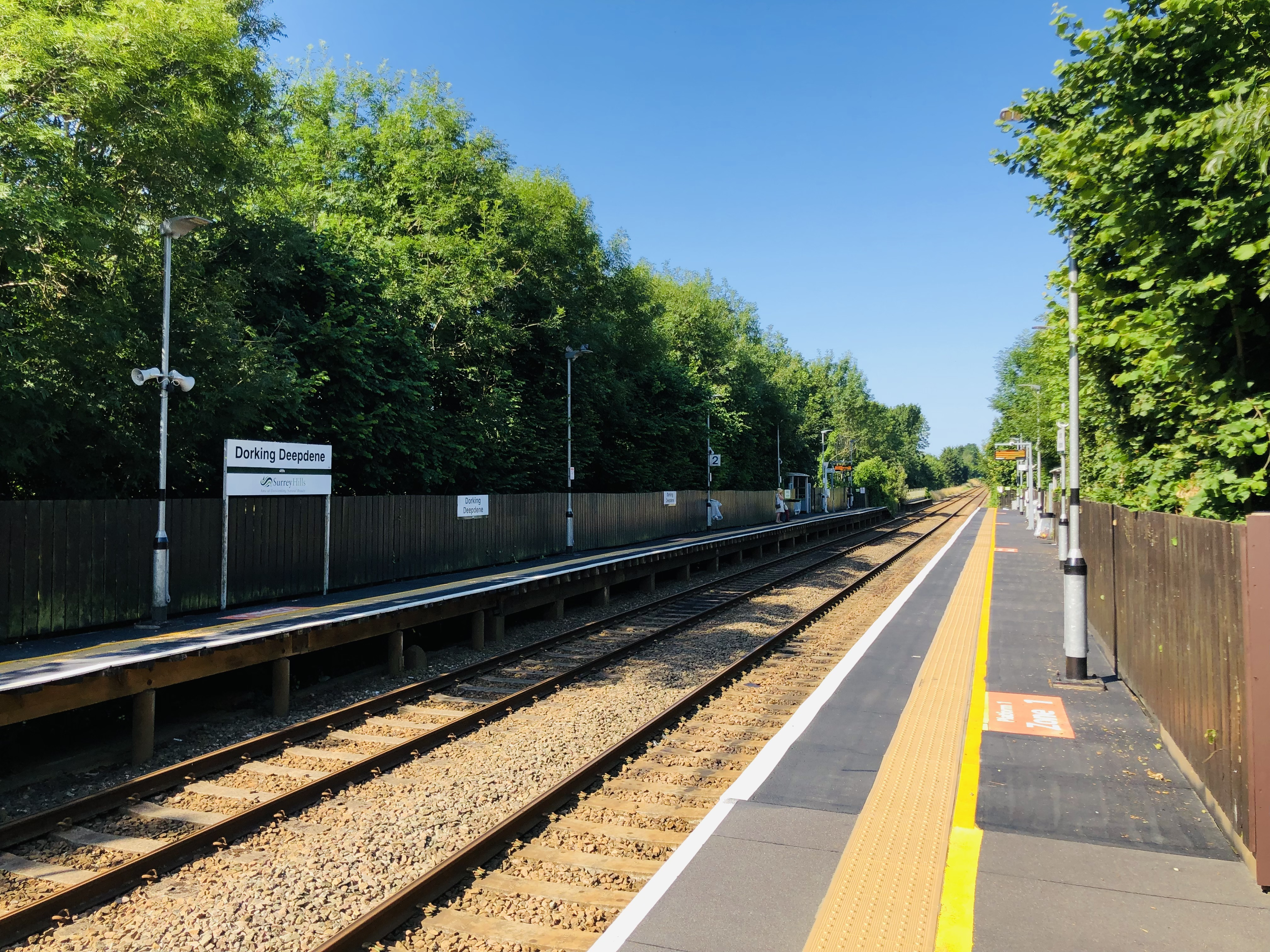
- The platforms at Dorking Deepdene, looking west

General information
- Location: Dorking, District of Mole Valley; England
- Coordinates: 51.239°N 0.325°W
- Grid reference: TQ171501
- Manager: Great Western Railway
- Platforms: 2

Other information
- Station code: DPD
- Classification: DfT category F1

History
- Original company: Reading, Guildford and Reigate Railway
- Pre-grouping: South Eastern Railway
- Post-grouping: Southern Railway

Key dates
- 1 February 1851: Station opened as Box Hill and Leatherhead Road
- March 1851: Renamed Box Hill
- 1 January 1917: Temporarily closed
- 1 January 1919: Reopened
- 9 July 1923: Renamed Deepdene
- 11 May 1987: Renamed Dorking (Deepdene)

Passengers
- 2020/21: ▼90,096
- Interchange: ▼82,960
- 2021/22: ▲0.237 million
- Interchange: ▲0.186 million
- 2022/23: ▲0.422 million
- Interchange: ▲0.218 million
- 2023/24: ▲0.464 million
- Interchange: ▼0.201 million
- 2024/25: ▲0.506 million
- Interchange: ▼67,097
Location
Notes
- Passenger statistics from the Office of Rail and Road

Dorking Deepdene railway station is a railway station in the town of Dorking, Surrey, England. Located on the North Downs Line, it lies 29 miles 65 chains (29.81 miles, 47.98 km) from London Victoria (via Redhill). The station is one of three within Dorking, alongside Dorking West (elsewhere on the North Downs line) and Dorking (on the Mole Valley line). The station is within walking distance of Dorking station and interchange on a through ticket is permitted.

Dorking Deepdene is managed by Great Western Railway, which also operates all services through the station.

The station has two platforms, each long enough to accommodate a four-carriage train. It is unstaffed and has no ticket office. Tickets can be bought on trains, at the automatic ticket machine at the entrance to the station, or at the ticket office at nearby Dorking station, which sells tickets for all National Rail services. The station is located on an embankment above street level and the platforms can only be reached by steps; passengers who require step-free access are advised to instead use Dorking West station, approximately 1 kilometre (0.62 mi) to the west, which is fully wheelchair-accessible.

== History ==
The Reading, Guildford and Reigate Railway (RG&RR) was authorised in 1846 and opened in stages. One of the first parts to open was between Redhill and Dorking, on 4 July 1849; the terminus was at the present-day Dorking West station.

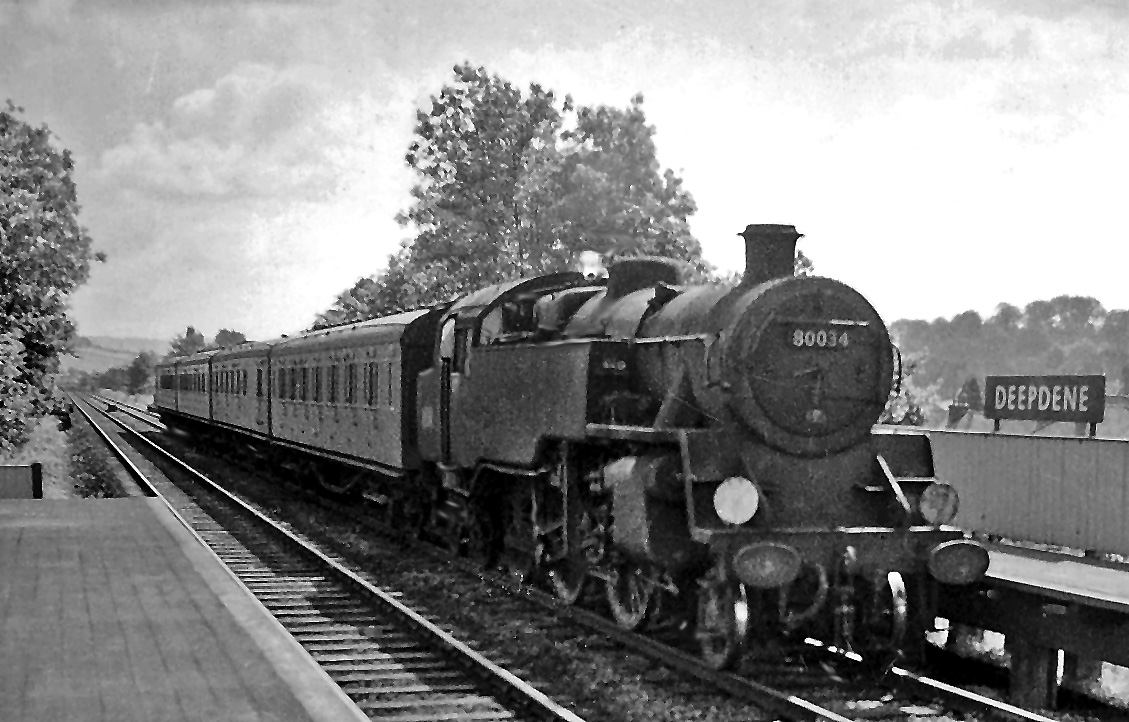
Redhill - Reading train in 1964

A second station in Dorking, which is now Dorking Deepdene, was not built until 1 February 1851; when it opened, it was originally named "Box Hill and Leatherhead Road" and it was shortened to "Box Hill" in March the same year. The RG&RR was soon absorbed by the South Eastern Railway (SER).

The station at Box Hill was temporarily closed from 1 January 1917, and reopened on 1 January 1919. In the 1923 grouping the SER became part of the new Southern Railway, which on 9 June of that year renamed the station "Deepdene" to avoid confusion with Box Hill & Westhumble station. On 11 May 1987 British Railways renamed the station "Dorking (Deepdene)".

== Services ==
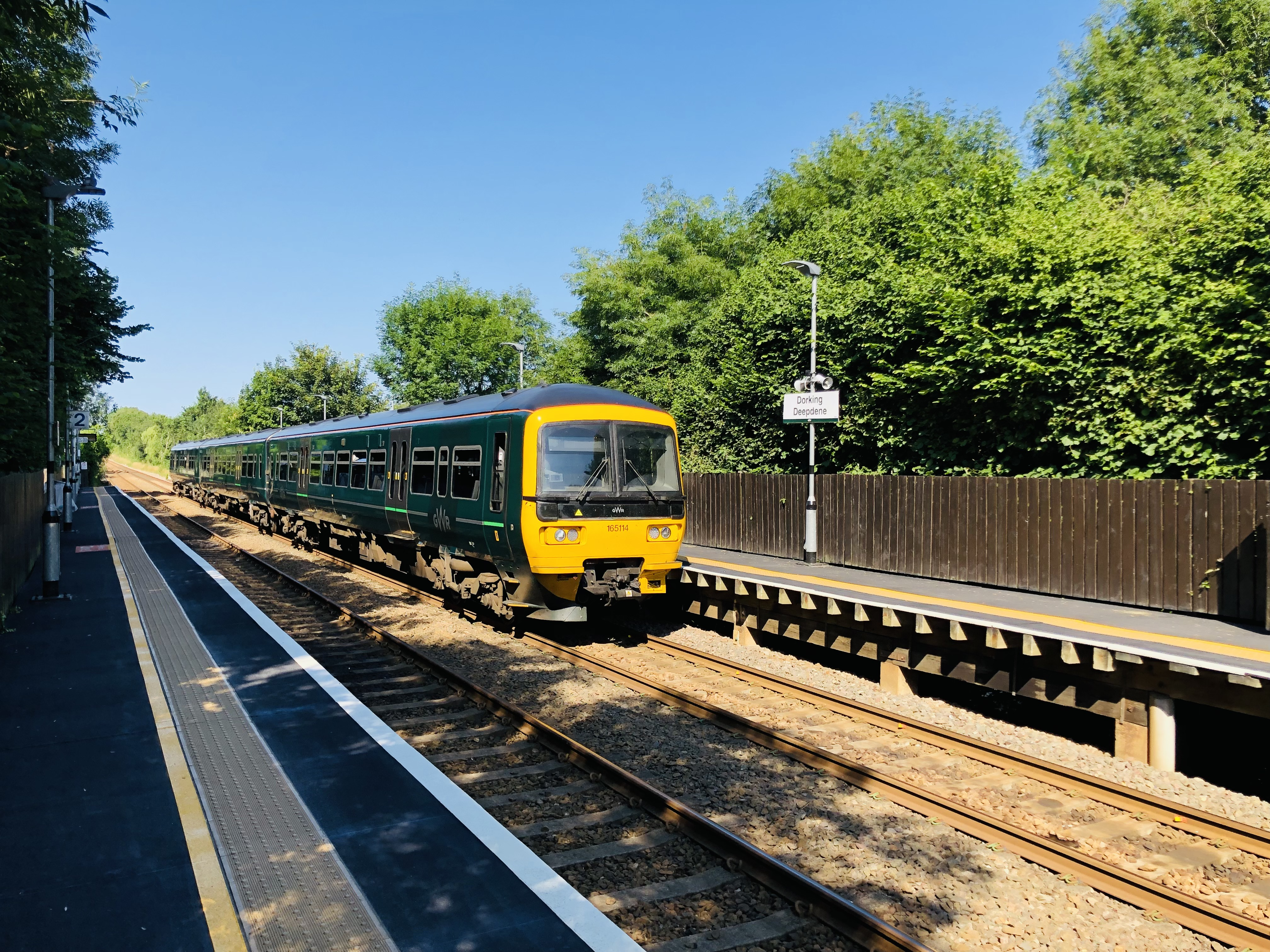
165114 arriving at Dorking Deepdene with a GWR service from Reading to Redhill

All services at Dorking Deepdene are operated by Great Western Railway using Class 165 and 166 DMUs.

The typical off-peak service is two trains per hour in each direction between Reading via Guildford and Gatwick Airport. During the late evenings, the service is reduced to hourly in each direction.

On Sundays, only one eastbound train per hour runs to Gatwick Airport, with one train per hour running only as far as Redhill.

Preceding station	National Rail	Following station
Betchworth	Great Western Railway North Downs Line	Dorking West

== Future proposals ==
In November 2018, a £21 million upgrade of Dorking Deepdene station was proposed by the Dorking Town Forum, who submitted a nomination for funding from Network Rail. The proposal includes:

- relocation of the platforms east of the current site (immediately west of the bridge over the Mole Valley line);
- construction of two new lifts, to allow step-free access to both platforms, and a pair of new waiting rooms;
- a direct foot link between Dorking Deepdene and Dorking stations, by means of a new 100-metre (330 ft)-long walkway constructed along the western edge of the Mole Valley line.
