= Motspur Park railway station =

National Rail station in London, England

Motspur Park
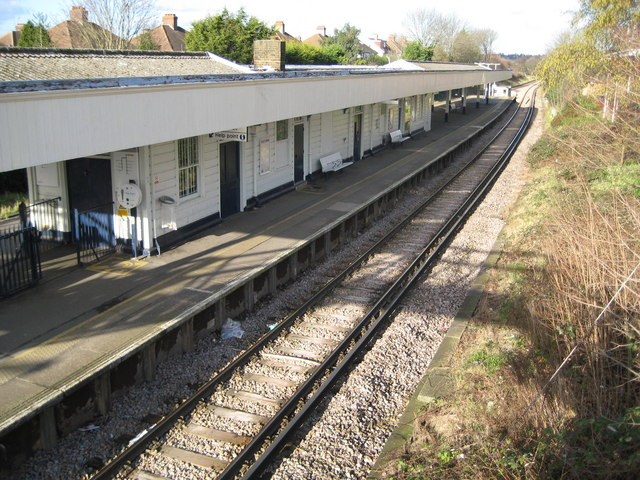
- Interactive map of Motspur Park

General information
- Location: Motspur Park
- Local authority: London Borough of Merton
- Managed by: South Western Railway
- Station code: MOT
- DfT category: C2
- Number of platforms: 2
- Accessible: Yes
- Fare zone: 4

National Rail annual entry and exit
- 2020–21: ▼0.270 million
- Interchange: ▼2,677
- 2021–22: ▲0.629 million
- Interchange: ▲6,087
- 2022–23: ▲0.745 million
- Interchange: ▲6,835
- 2023–24: ▲0.778 million
- Interchange: ▲7,577
- 2024–25: ▲0.822 million
- Interchange: ▲7,759

Key dates
- 12 July 1925: Opened

Other information
- External links: Departures; Facilities
- Coordinates: 51.3958°N 0.2397°W

Motspur Park railway station is a National Rail station in the London Borough of Merton in south London. The station is served by South Western Railway, and is in London fare zone 4. It is 9 miles 57 chains (15.6 km) down the line from London Waterloo.

Southbound destinations are Chessington South, Dorking and Guildford.

== History ==
The railway itself was constructed through the locality in 1859 but Motspur Park station was not added until 1925.

On 6 November 1947, there was a train crash at Motspur Park junction, 766 yards (700 m) south of the station, which killed four and injured 12 people. In foggy conditions, a train was incorrectly authorised by a fog signalman to pass a danger signal, and collided with another train that was crossing the line in front of it.

A signal box once stood at the western trackside approximately 50 yards (46 m) from the southern end of the platform but this was demolished in 1992 when the level crossing changed to a modern CCTV type controlled from Wimbledon Area Signalling Centre.

The station stands atop a railway embankment off a service road behind a parade of shops on West Barnes Lane. The shops and surrounding streets on both sides of the line are known as Motspur Park. There is also footpath access from Claremont Avenue on the western side.

The station is a single island platform reached by footbridge from either side of the track. The station retained its original Southern Railway buildings in the centre of the platform until August 2023 when they were demolished for the Network Rail Wessex Access for All scheme.

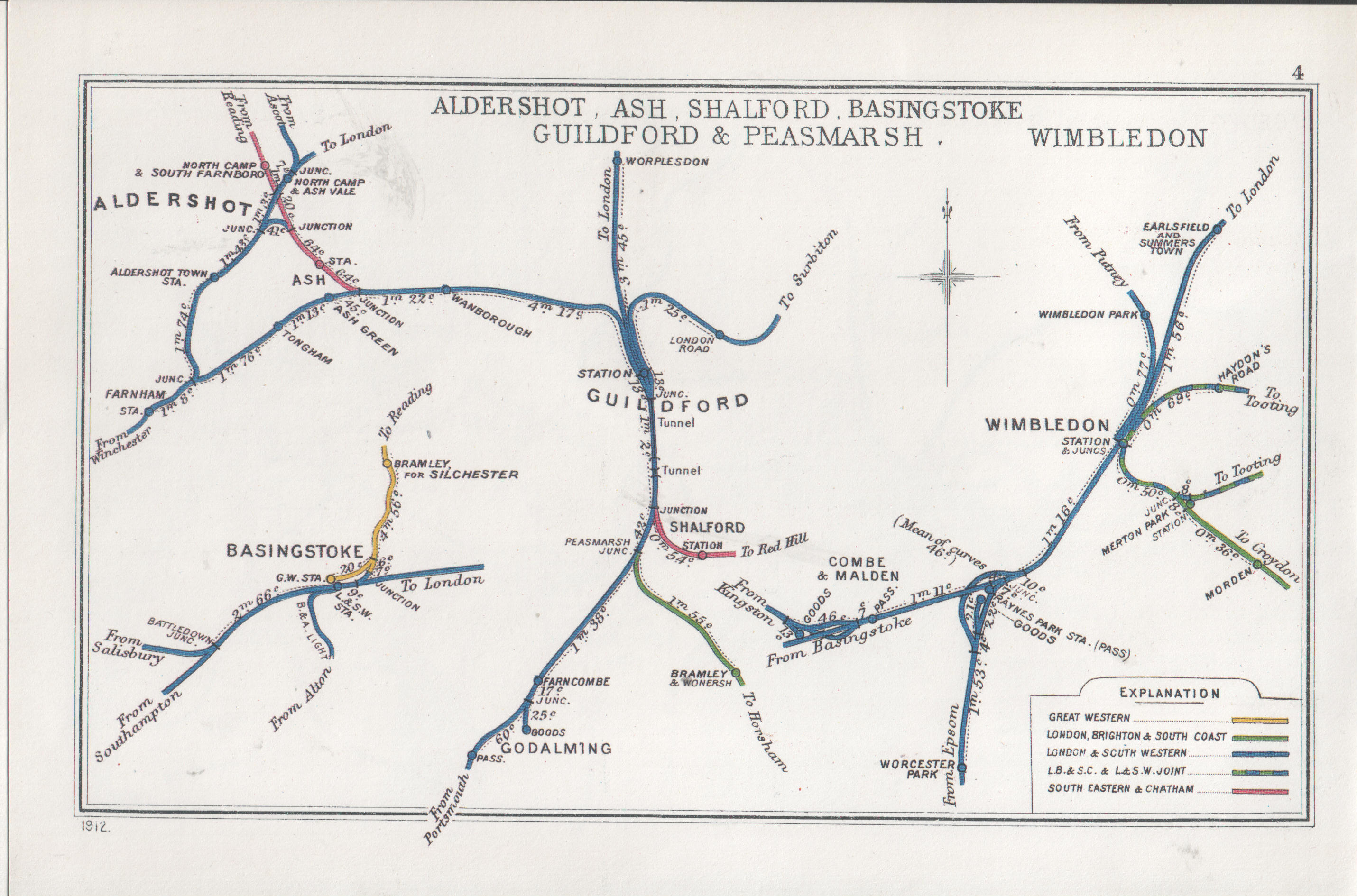
This 1912 Railway Clearing House map shows the lines around Motspur Park railway station, but not the actual station, which was only opened in 1925.

== Future ==
Under Transport for London's plans for Crossrail 2, Motspur Park was originally chosen as a hub station to serve Malden Manor, Tolworth and Chessington North on the Chessington Branch Line as well as Worcester Park, Stoneleigh and Ewell West on the Mole Valley Line. Crossrail trains were not planned to stop at those stations so as to provide fast suburban links to a wide variety of railway stations including Victoria and Kings Cross St Pancras.

In October 2015, TfL announced a set of local consultations would take place and their amended proposal provides that Crossrail 2 trains will now stop at all stations on the routes to the south and west of Wimbledon. Construction of the line is currently on hold due to a lack of available funding.

== Services ==
All services at Motspur Park are operated by South Western Railway.

The typical off-peak service in trains per hour is:

- 4 tph to London Waterloo via Wimbledon
- 2 tph to Chessington South
- 1 tph to Dorking via Epsom
- 1 tph to Guildford via Epsom

Additional services call at the station during the peak hours.

Preceding station	National Rail	Following station
Raynes Park	South Western Railway Mole Valley Line	Worcester Park
Raynes Park	South Western Railway Chessington Branch Line	Malden Manor

== Connections ==
London Buses route K5 serves the station.
