= Worcester railway station =

Worcester railway station can refer to several different stations:

In the United Kingdom

- Worcester Foregate Street railway station in the centre of Worcester
- Worcester Shrub Hill railway station to the east of Worcester city centre
- Worcester Park railway station in Worcester Park, south-west London
- Worcestershire Parkway railway station, about a mile outside of Worcester near the village of Norton

In the United States

- Union Station (Worcester, Massachusetts)
