= The Station, Stoneleigh =

Public house in Stoneleigh, Surrey, England

Coordinates: 51.362973°N 0.24781959°W

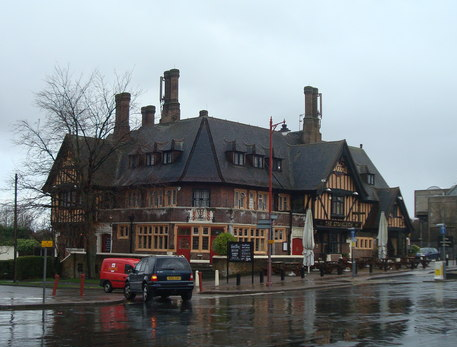
The Station, 2009

The Station is a Grade II-listed public house in Stoneleigh, north Surrey, England. It was built during the interwar period to serve new areas of housing constructed close to Stoneleigh railway station. Opened in 1935 as The Stoneleigh Hotel, it has also been known as the Stoneleigh Inn.

== History ==
Stoneleigh railway station opened in July 1932 and the following year, the first shops opened on Stoneleigh Broadway, the street leading to the east. The first application to build a public house on the street, in February 1934, was refused by the Epsom magistrates, but a reapplication the following month was approved. In March 1934, the applicants noted that there were over 2,000 houses within 0.5 mi (0.80 km) of the station.

The Stoneleigh Hotel, as it was known on opening, was designed by the architect A. E. Sewell for Truman, Hanbury and Buxton brewery and was completed in November 1935. Constructed in the mock-Tudor style and half-timbered in oak, it was sited on a 1-acre (0.40 ha) plot on the south side of Stoneleigh Broadway and to the east of the railway line. The total cost was around £25,000 and the building included both saloon and lounge bars, an off-license shop, a smoking room and a billiards room. The first floor social hall was used for private functions and public meetings and could accommodate up to 150 people. The original main entrance, on the north side, takes the form of a Tudor arch, with panels depicting a wheatsheaf and coats of arms. Some of the external oak beams are carved with vine motifs and the gable ends include decorated panels.

Alterations to the building included the creation of a committee room on the ground floor in 1936 and a small extension to the first-floor hall in 1938. By 1976, the pub was known as the "Stoneleigh Inn" and, in 2012, it became "The Station". It was given Grade II listed status in 2015 by Historic England.
