= London Buses route K5 =

London bus route

K5
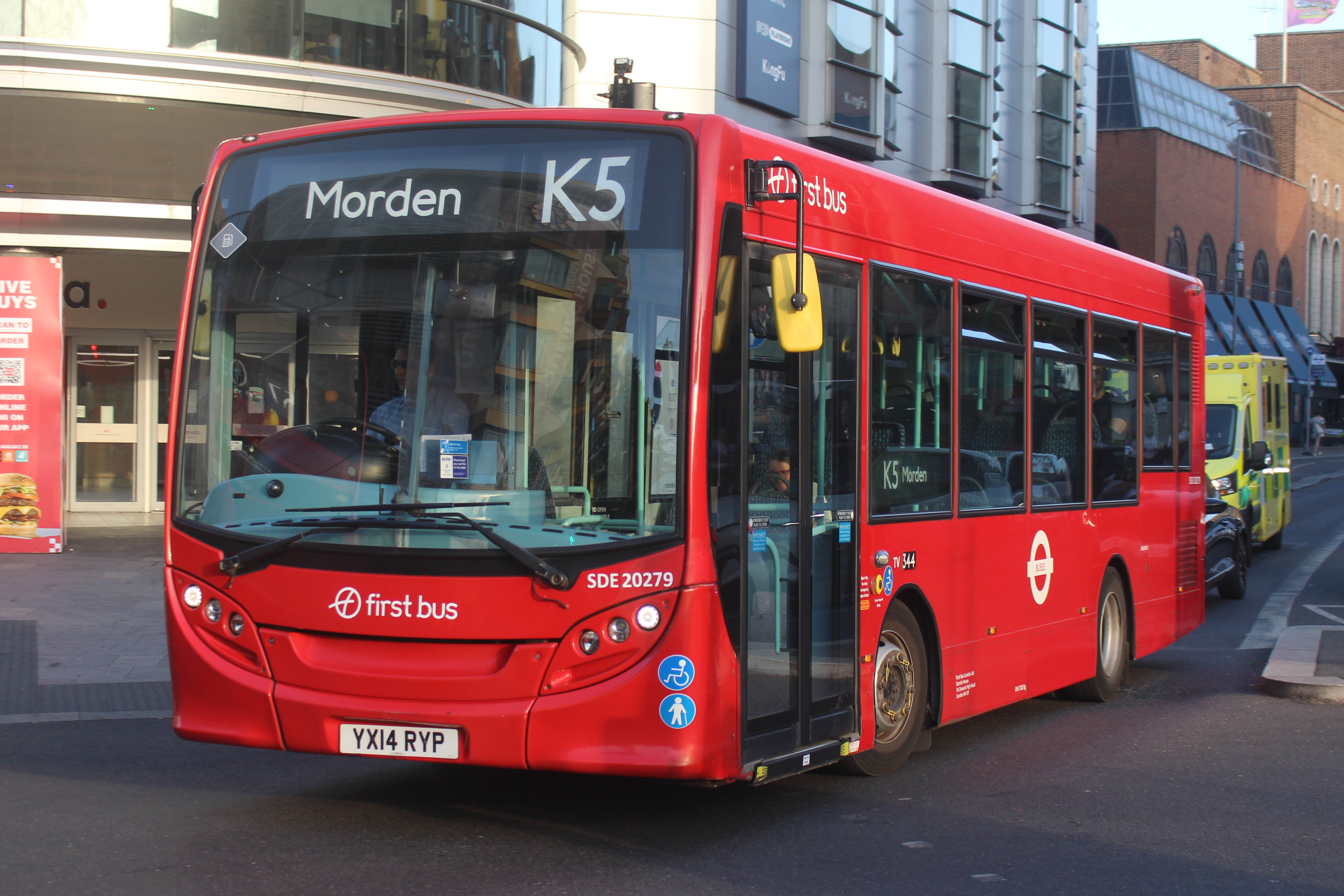
- London United Alexander Dennis Enviro200 at Kingston station in May 2026

Overview
- Operator: London United (First Bus London)
- Garage: Tolworth

Route
- Start: Morden station
- Via: Kingston upon Thames; New Malden; Motspur Park; Raynes Park
- End: Ham
- "Performance" (PDF). tfl.gov.uk. Archived from the original (PDF) on 5 July 2012.

London Buses route K5 is a Transport for London contracted bus route in London, England. Running between Morden station and Ham, it is operated by First Bus London subsidiary London United.

== History ==
The K5 has undergone a thorough and frequent rerouting throughout its history. The route was launched in December 1989 as a one-way loop from Kingston upon Thames to New Malden. It was a Hoppa service. In June 1990 the route was rerouted to serve Kingston Hospital and extended to serve New Malden police station. A month later, the route was extended from New Malden Police Station to New Malden railway station via New Malden High Street. In May 1993, the route was rerouted again after operation was passed to London & Country. In July 1998, the route was passed to Arriva Croydon & North Surrey and consequently extended to North Cheam via Motspur Park railway station, Malden Manor railway station, Worcester Park railway station and Worcester Park High Street, however in July 1999 Tellings-Golden Miller won the route's contract and in November 2000 rerouted it from South Lane to Raynes Park railway station and was extended from Kingston to Ham. In June 2001, Mitcham Belle took over the route with it extended to Morden tube station. The route has not been altered since then, however in August 2004 Centra took over Mitcham Belle's bus operations.

In February 2006 the route was taken over by Transdev London.

The K5 contract was originally going to be discontinued in June 2006. However, after public consultation and pressure from travellers' groups, TfL agreed to keep it running, citing a 'clear public need'. However, the bus route was omitted from a TfL map shortly after it was saved, raising the ire of North Kingston residents. When next tendered it was awarded to Quality Line from August 2011.

In 2009, a consultation was initiated regarding the usefulness of the route. Motspur Park residents responded en masse, and in 2011 launched a petition to improve the service of the route. On 2 July 2016, the frequency of the route was doubled from hourly to half-hourly.

When next tendered Quality Line retained the route with a new contract that commenced on 3 September 2016.

On 28 February 2025, the route passed from London United to First Bus London following the acquisition of RATP Dev Transit London by FirstGroup.

== Current route ==
Route K5 operates via these primary locations:

- Morden station
- Wimbledon Chase station
- Raynes Park station
- Motspur Park station
- New Malden
- Kingston Hospital
- Norbiton station
- Kingston station
- Cromwell Road bus station
- Ham Beaufort Road
