= Stoneleigh railway station =

National Rail station in London, England

Stoneleigh
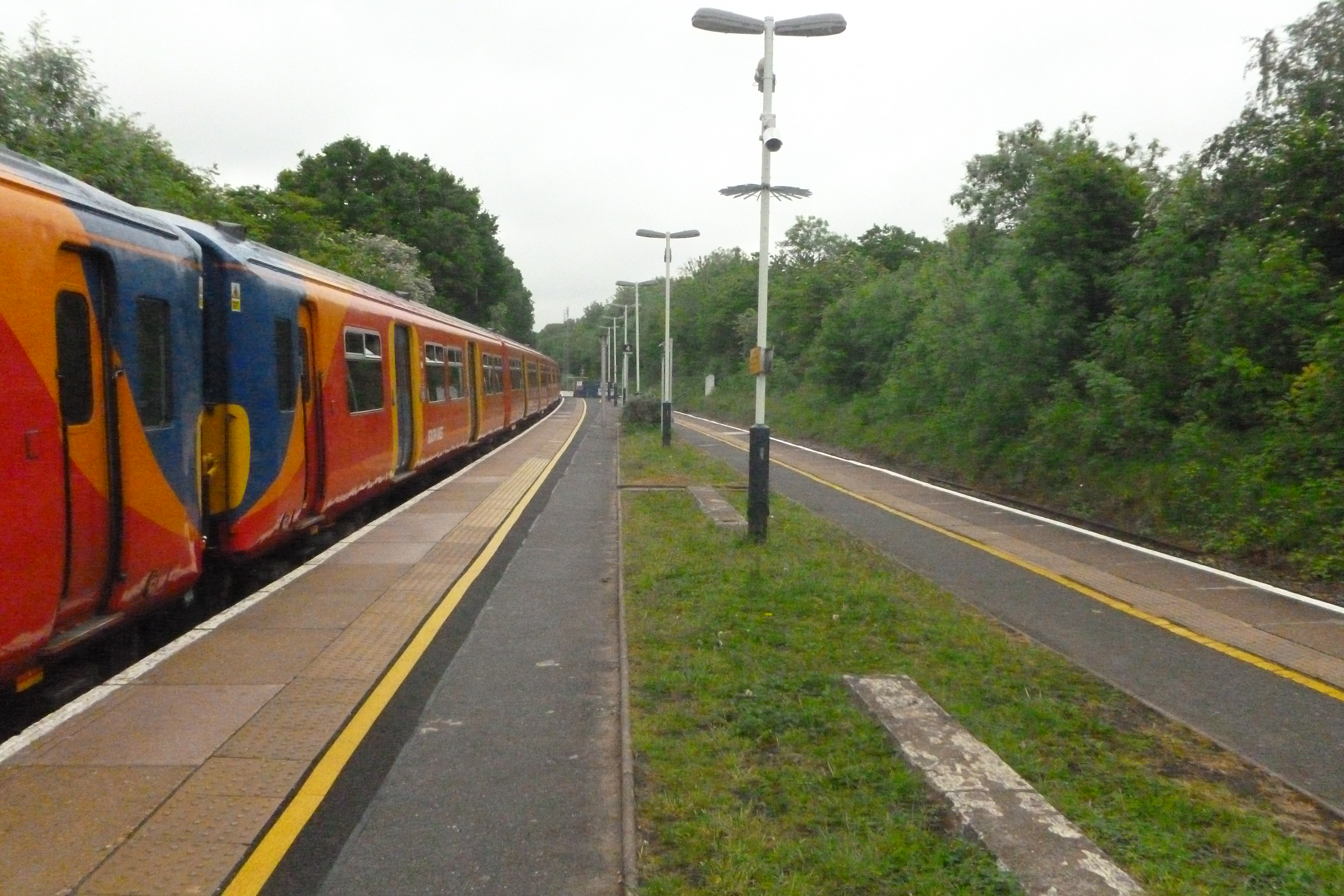
- A class 455 train at Stoneleigh Station (2013)
- Interactive map of Stoneleigh

General information
- Location: Stoneleigh
- Local authority: Borough of Epsom and Ewell
- Managed by: South Western Railway
- Station code: SNL
- DfT category: C2
- Number of platforms: 2
- Accessible: Yes
- Fare zone: 5

National Rail annual entry and exit
- 2020–21: ▼0.202 million
- 2021–22: ▲0.532 million
- 2022–23: ▲0.667 million
- 2023–24: ▲0.767 million
- 2024–25: ▲0.807 million

Key dates
- 17 July 1932; 93 years ago: Opened

Other information
- External links: Departures; Facilities
- Coordinates: 51.363°N 0.2485°W

Stoneleigh railway station is in the Epsom and Ewell district of Surrey, England. The station is served by South Western Railway and is currently in London fare zone 5 (because of its proximity to the Greater London boundary); it is the only National Rail station in zone 5 not to be located in a London borough. It is located in the village of Stoneleigh, Surrey at grid reference TQ221642, 11 miles 74 chains (19.2 km) down the line from London Waterloo.

== Description ==
The station was opened in 1932 and was built in the utilitarian concrete style of the 1930s. It has an island platform with the ticket office in the overbridge opposite the platform entrance steps. In 2024 the Station was modernized with the replacement of the overbridge with a modern elevator equipped alternative to afford step free access.

Access to the station is from either side of the line, the east side from Stoneleigh Broadway, and the west side from Station Approach, off Stoneleigh Park Road. In 2013, the platform was extended so that ten-carriage trains can stop at the station. This opened in late 2014.

During the 1980s-1990s the station won many awards for "Best Station" due to its well kept flower beds set between the platforms.

== Services ==
All services at Stoneleigh are operated by South Western Railway.

The typical off-peak service in trains per hour is:

- 2 tph to London Waterloo via Wimbledon
- 1 tph to Dorking
- 1 tph to Guildford

Additional services call at the station during the peak hours.

| Preceding station | National Rail | Following station |
|---|---|---|
| Worcester Park | South Western Railway Mole Valley Line | Ewell West |
