= Hoppa (London Buses) =

Hoppa was a brand of London Buses routes operated by minibuses. Hoppa services were used as a low cost replacement for lower frequency routes previously operated by conventional buses. The smaller vehicles could also access residential streets that were previously unserved by buses. Hoppa routes were phased out following the Disability Discrimination Act 1995, which resulted in standard accessible vehicles being used on all London bus routes.

== History ==
The use of minibuses for urban bus routes was a consequence of the Transport Act 1985. The legislation introduced competitive tendering of bus routes in London and minibuses on low patronage routes were a low cost alternative to conventional buses.

The brand was introduced by London Regional Transport (LRT). The routes used single door minibuses or midibuses. The smaller vehicles could serve residential streets which full sized buses could not reach. This could bring more Londoners within 400 metres of a bus service. Hail and ride sections were employed on residential streets, avoiding the need to install new bus stops. Some routes were sponsored by local councils with funding provided to get services started. The H24 and H25 routes were funded by Hounslow Council and opened by John Prescott, Shadow Secretary of State for Transport, in January 1991.

The use of minibuses was phased out following the Disability Discrimination Act 1995, which required all single floor buses to be accessible by 1 January 2016. London Regional Transport was replaced by Transport for London in 2000.

== List of Hoppa routes ==
The Hoppa routes were introduced as follows:

Route	Branding	Terminals	Service start	Notes
193	Hornchurch Hoppa	Romford to County Park Estate	2 August 1986	Replaced routes 193 and 256
268	Hampstead Hoppa	Finchley Road to Golders Green tube station	31 May 1986	
346	Hornchurch Hoppa	Upminster to Corbets Tey	24 September 1988	Replaced route 246A
379	Enfield Hoppa	Chingford railway station to Yardley Lane Estate	5 March 1989	
C2	Camden Hoppa	Regent Street to Parliament Hill Fields	4 April 1987	
H12	Harrow Hoppa	Harrow Weald to South Harrow tube station	14 November 1987	Replaced route 209
H20	Hounslow Hoppa	Hounslow Civic Centre to Ivybridge Estate	18 March 1989	Initially funded by Hounslow Council
H24	Hounslow Hoppa	Hatton Cross tube station to Feltham	January 1991	Initially funded by Hounslow Council
H25	Hounslow Hoppa	Feltham to Hanworth	January 1991	Initially funded by Hounslow Council
K1	Kingston Hoppa	New Malden to Surbiton	28 June 1987	
K2	Kingston Hoppa	Hook to Kingston Hospital	28 June 1987	
K3	Kingston Hoppa	Kingston to Esher	28 June 1987	Replaced route 215
K4	Kingston Hoppa	Kingston to Hook	2 December 1989	Initially run as six month experiment funded by Kingston Council
K5	Kingston Hoppa	Kingston to New Malden	2 December 1989	Initially run as six month experiment funded by Kingston Council
K6	Kingston Hoppa	Kingston to Kingston Vale	2 December 1989	Initially run as six month experiment funded by Kingston Council
P11	Peckham Hoppa	Peckham to Waterloo	19 November 1988	
S2	Hackney Hoppa	Stratford to Clapton	24 February 1990	
W13	Woodford Hoppa	Leytonstone tube station to Woodford Wells	4 March 1989	
W14	Woodford Hoppa	Leytonstone tube station to Claybury Hospital	4 March 1989	

== See also ==
- Hotel Hoppa
