= Dorking West railway station =

Railway station in Surrey, England

Coordinates: 51.236°N 0.340°W

Dorking West
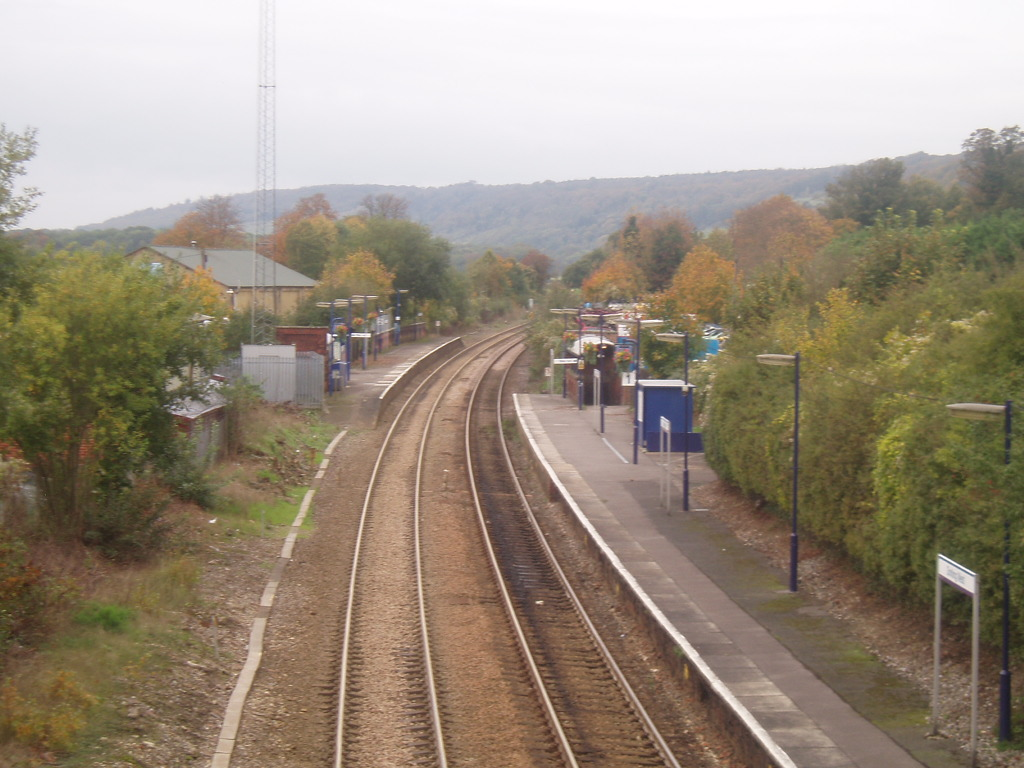

General information
- Location: Dorking, Mole Valley; England
- Grid reference: TQ159498
- Manager: Great Western Railway
- Platforms: 2

Other information
- Station code: DKT
- Classification: DfT category F1

History
- Original company: Reading, Guildford and Reigate Railway
- Pre-grouping: South Eastern Railway
- Post-grouping: Southern Railway

Key dates
- 4 July 1849: opened as Dorking
- 1923: renamed Dorking Town
- 1987: renamed Dorking West

Passengers
- 2021/22: ▲33,278
- Interchange: ▲205
- 2022/23: ▲33,452
- Interchange: ▲249
- 2023/24: ▲36,782
- Interchange: ▼115
- 2024/25: ▲40,162
- 2025/26: ▲41,858
Location
Notes
- Passenger statistics from the Office of Rail and Road

Dorking West railway station is in Dorking, Surrey, England. It is 30 miles 42 chains (30.53 miles, 49.13 km) from London Charing Cross, via Redhill, and is one of three stations serving the town, the others being Dorking and Dorking Deepdene. Dorking West is on the North Downs Line between Dorking Deepdene and Gomshall. The station is managed by Great Western Railway, which also operates all trains serving it.

== History ==
The Reading, Guildford and Reigate Railway opened the station on 4 July 1849 as Dorking. From the outset it was leased and worked by the South Eastern Railway, which absorbed the RG&RR in 1852.

In 1867 the London, Brighton and South Coast Railway opened a line from Leatherhead to Dorking, with its own Dorking railway station. The new Southern Railway renamed both stations in 1923, with the original Dorking station becoming Dorking Town. In 1987, Network SouthEast renamed it to the current Dorking West.

== Facilities ==
The station has two platforms, which can each accommodate a five-coach train. It is unstaffed. The station has help points, live departure screens and cycle storage.

== Passenger volume ==
Although it is the least used of the three Dorking stations (as low as 16 passengers/year in 2011–12), the official rail passenger usage data is misleading because most tickets are issued to/from "Dorking Stations", rather than Dorking West specifically. The figures for that year were widely rejected by local residents; First Great Western, then-operator of services at the station, blamed an anomaly on the ticket recording system.

Passenger volume at Dorking West
	2004–05	2005–06	2006–07	2007–08	2008–09	2009–10	2010–11	2011–12	2012–13	2013–14	2014–15	2015–16	2016–17	2017–18	2018–19	2019–20	2020–21	2021–22	2022–23	2023–24	2024–25
Entries and exits	29	40	79	52	104	1,810	22	16	55,774	56,948	62,308	58,877	55,995	62,071	61,928	57,066	12,648	33,278	33,452	36,782	40,162
Interchanges	0	0	0	0	0	0	0	0	0	0	1,639	1,070	744	482	479	364	100	205	249	115	0

The statistics cover twelve month periods that start in April.

== Services ==
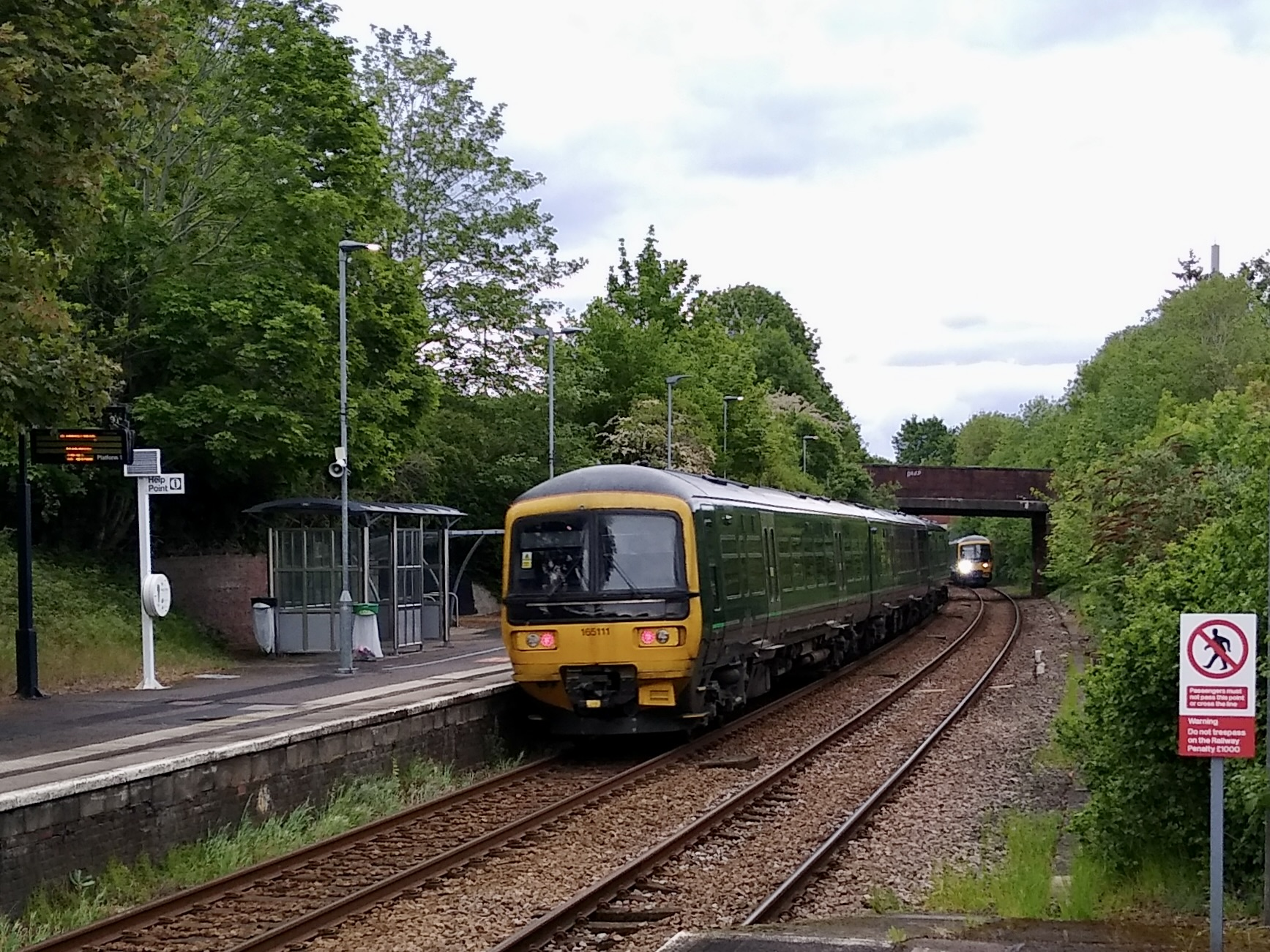
Two Great Western Railway services pass the station in 2026

All services at Dorking West are operated by Great Western Railway using Class 165 and 166 DMUs.

The typical off-peak service is one train every two hours in each direction between Reading via Guildford and Gatwick Airport. During the peak hours, the service is increased to one train per hour in each direction.

On Sundays, eastbound services at the station run only as far as Redhill.

Preceding station	National Rail	Following station
Dorking Deepdene	Great Western Railway North Downs Line	Gomshall

== Bibliography ==
- Quick, Michael (2023). Railway Passenger Stations in Great Britain: A Chronology (PDF) (5th ed.). London: Railway and Canal Historical Society.
- White, H.P. (1961). A regional history of the railways of southern England: Vol. II. London: Phoenix House.
