= Raynes Park railway station =

National Rail station in London, England

Raynes Park
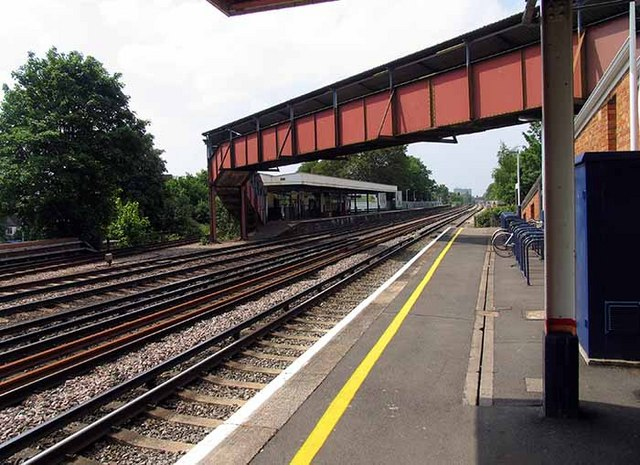
- Interactive map of Raynes Park

General information
- Location: Raynes Park
- Local authority: London Borough of Merton
- Managed by: South Western Railway
- Station code: RAY
- DfT category: C2
- Number of platforms: 4
- Tracks: 4
- Fare zone: 4

National Rail annual entry and exit
- 2020–21: ▼1.049 million
- Interchange: ▼34,467
- 2021–22: ▲2.421 million
- Interchange: ▲90,070
- 2022–23: ▲2.940 million
- Interchange: ▼72,722
- 2023–24: ▲3.287 million
- Interchange: ▲93,595
- 2024–25: ▲3.498 million
- Interchange: ▲97,448

Key dates
- 30 October 1871: Opened

Other information
- External links: Departures; Facilities
- Coordinates: 51°24′34″N 0°13′48″W

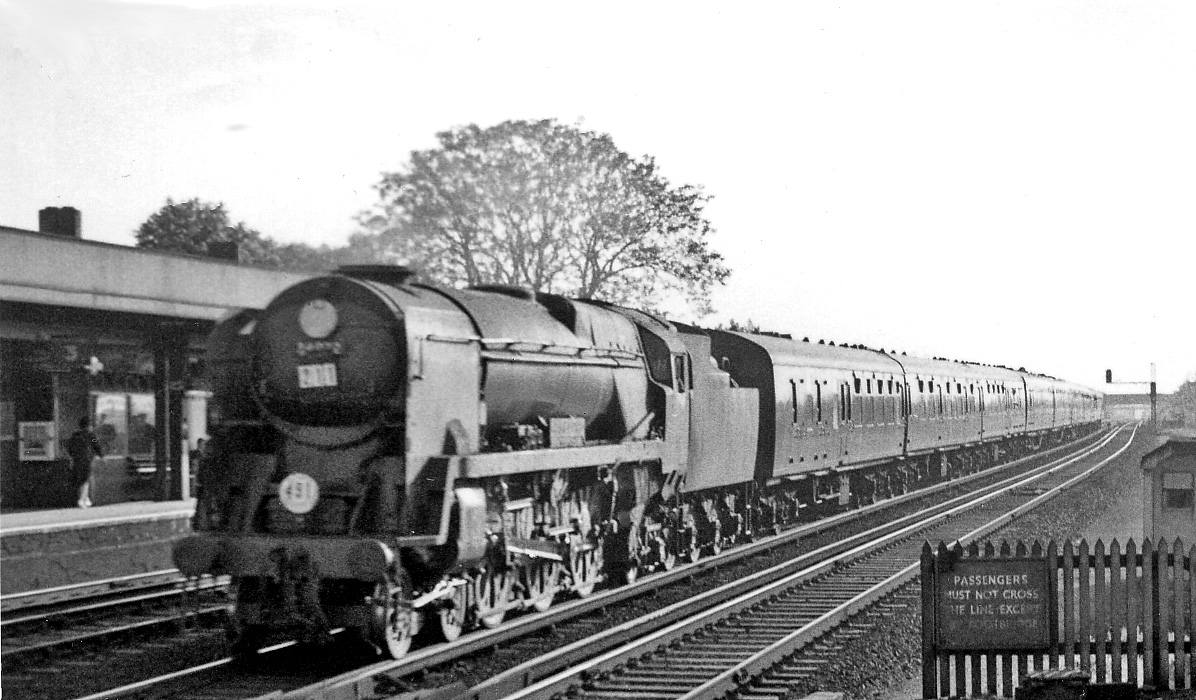
Plymouth – Waterloo express passing in 1964

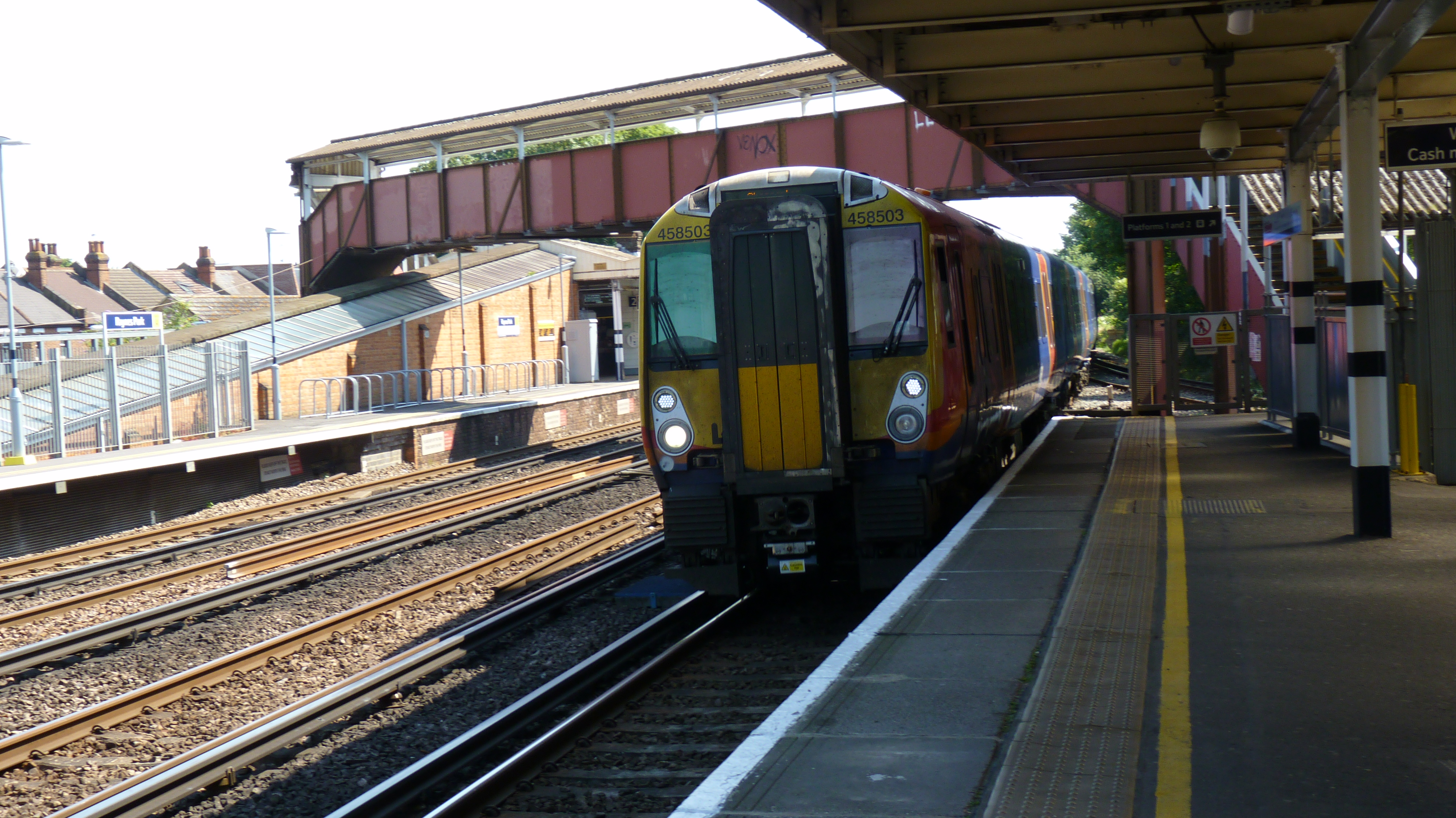
Train arriving at Raynes Park Station

Raynes Park railway station serves the district of Raynes Park in the London Borough of Merton. It is 8 miles 51 chains (13.9 km) south-west of London Waterloo and is situated between Wimbledon and New Malden on the South West Main Line. The next station along on the Mole Valley branch line is Motspur Park.

The station is served by South Western Railway, and is in London fare zone 4. It has 4 platforms and 2 of them are accessible with ramps from the station entrance (those being the platforms to London Waterloo)

== History ==
The railway station at Raynes Park was opened on 30 October 1871 on the London & South Western Railway (L&SWR) line that ran from its terminus at London Waterloo to Woking and beyond. The line runs east by north-east in the London direction and has two through lines (for express services) through the middle and platforms to the outsides.

Raynes Park is the junction station where the line to Motspur Park (and on to Chessington South, Dorking or Guildford) branches off from the South West Main Line ultimately to coastal resorts and port cities.

The track to Epsom was to compete with the London, Brighton and South Coast Railway (LBSCR)'s Mole Valley Lines to Epsom but then use statutory running powers over that line through Ashtead to Leatherhead. From where the London and South Western Railway (LSWR)'s second Guildford track headed via Effingham Junction to Guildford, south-west following its line built from the north. From Epsom, the LBSCR laid the southward track via Dorking (then called Dorking North) to Horsham.

One distinct feature of the station is the long footbridge over the four tracks of the main line which is set at an angle because of the offset of the platforms. This stands out as the main line is on a fairly high embankment (allowing local roads and the Epsom line to pass beneath). Passenger access to the station is via subway at street level on either side of the main line.

There was originally a LSWR mechanical signal box at the far south, opposite platforms 1 and 2, but this was demolished and replaced by modern automated signalling equipment many years ago.

Raynes Park goods yard was in and beyond the notch between Platforms 3 and 4, and was accessed from the Epsom lines. It did not push right up into the point of the V. The goods yard is no longer in use and is now occupied by local manufacturing firms.

== Accidents and incidents ==
- On 25 May 1933, a passenger train from London Waterloo to Alton, hauled by LSWR M7 Class 0-4-4T No. 107, was derailed approaching the station, coming to rest foul of an adjacent line. Another passenger train from Southampton Terminus to Waterloo, hauled by an SR U Class 2-6-0, was in a side-long collision with it. Five people were killed and 35 were injured. The cause of the accident was the failure to implement a speed restriction on a section of track that was under maintenance. The locomotive is given as No. 1621 in the official accident report but as No. 1618 (now preserved at the Bluebell Railway) in another source.
- On 28 November 1967, a newspaper train was derailed entering the station. One of the vans struck the support pillars of the footbridge, severely damaging it. The line was blocked for two days. The cause of the accident was that the guard of the train failed to inform the driver that there were wagons in the train restricted to 45 miles per hour (72 km/h). The train was booked to run at up to 75 miles per hour (121 km/h) and was doing about 60 miles per hour (97 km/h) when it derailed.

== Platforms and infrastructure ==
The station has four platforms on two islands, 1 and 2 on the up lines, and 3 and 4 on the down lines.

- Platform 1 is an eastbound platform for services to London Waterloo that have originated from Guildford, Dorking (both via Epsom) or Chessington South.
- Platform 2 is an eastbound platform for services to London Waterloo that have originated from Waterloo (via Strawberry Hill on the Kingston loop), Hampton Court or Shepperton and for passing services to London Waterloo that have originated from Woking, Guildford via Cobham & Stoke d’Abernon and Guildford via Woking.
- Platform 3 is a westbound platform for trains to Waterloo (via Strawberry Hill on the Kingston loop), Hampton Court or Shepperton and for passing services to Woking, Guildford via Cobham & Stoke d’Abernon and Guildford via Woking.
- Platform 4 is a south-westbound platform for trains to Guildford, Dorking (both via Worcester Park and Epsom) or Chessington South.

There are no platforms for the two central fast tracks on the main line, as none of the services using these tracks stop at Raynes Park.

The Epsom to London line, arriving from the south-west, passes under the four main line tracks to the west of the station and then curves up and right to platform 1. Beyond the platforms it makes a trailing junction onto the up slow line to Waterloo. Opposite platform 2 the down Epsom line branches off the down slow main line to arrive at platform 4, on the left side of a V formed with platform 3. The line then drops away to the south to parallel the up Epsom line after the station. The down slow continues straight ahead on the right hand side of the V to platform 3.

== Services ==
All services at Raynes Park are operated by South Western Railway.

The typical off-peak service in trains per hour is:

- 10 tph to London Waterloo via Wimbledon
- 2 tph to Chessington South
- 2 tph to Shepperton via Kingston
- 2 tph to Teddington via Kingston, returning to London Waterloo via Richmond
- 2 tph to Hampton Court
- 1 tph to Dorking via Epsom
- 1 tph to Guildford via Epsom

Additional services call at the station during the peak hours.

Preceding station	National Rail	Following station
Wimbledon	South Western Railway South West Main Line	New Malden
Wimbledon	South Western Railway Mole Valley Line	Motspur Park

== Connections ==
London Buses routes 57, 131, 152, 163, 200 and K5 and night route N87 serve the station.

== Refurbishment ==
Raynes Park railway station was refurbished between March 2009 and July 2009. The refurbishment programme involved constructing a new entrance, ticket office and gateline, and converting the previous ticket office into a new retail unit. Automatic ticket gates were installed at all of the exits to the station, which allowed the station to accept the Oyster "Pay as you go" electronic ticketing system from January 2010. Waiting rooms, toilets, and platform areas were also refurbished to improve passenger safety and comfort.
