= Worcester Park railway station =

National Rail station in London, England

Worcester Park
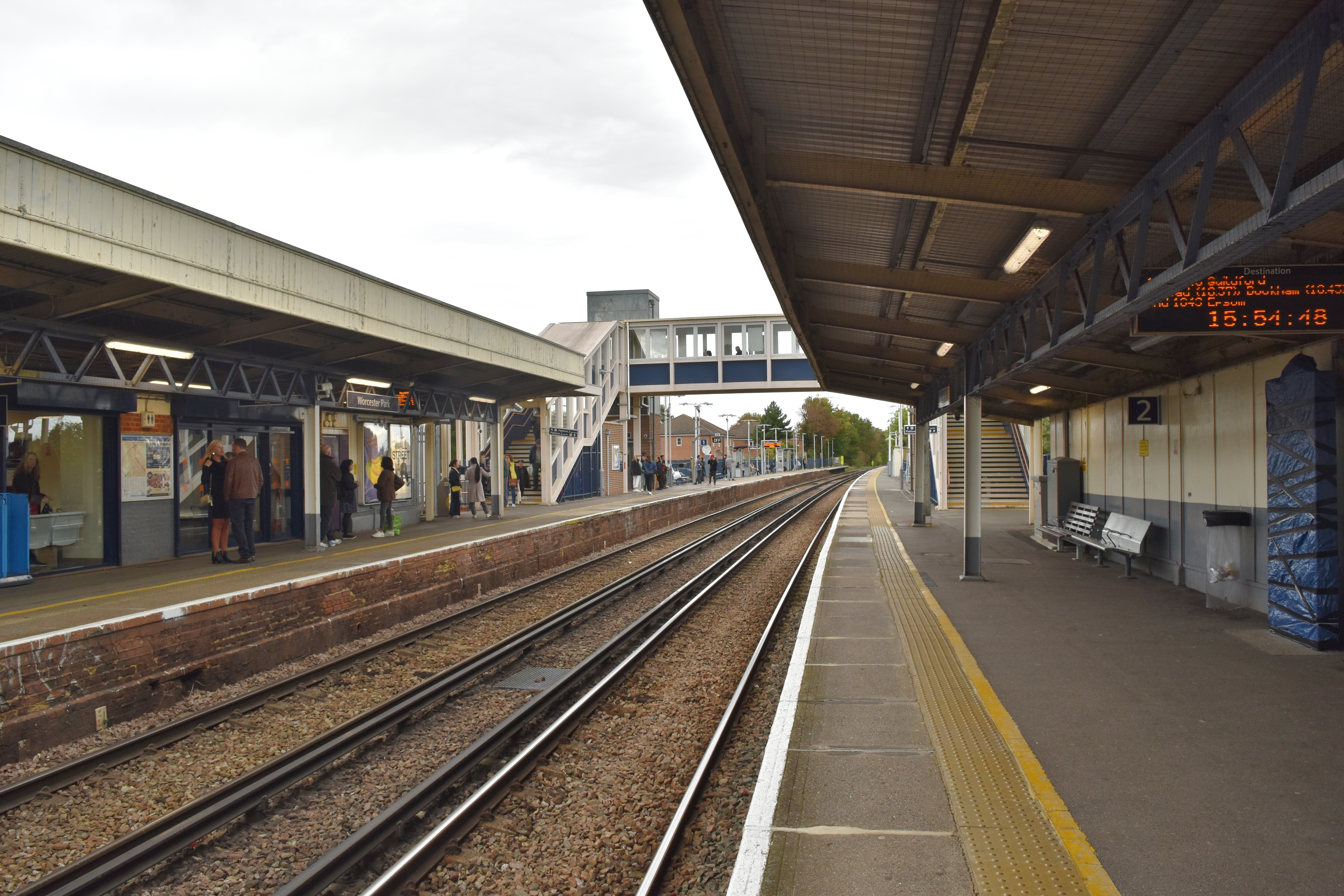
- View northbound from platform 2
- Interactive map of Worcester Park

General information
- Location: Worcester Park
- Local authority: Kingston/Sutton
- Managed by: South Western Railway
- Station code: WCP
- DfT category: C2
- Number of platforms: 2
- Accessible: Yes
- Fare zone: 4

National Rail annual entry and exit
- 2020–21: ▼0.422 million
- 2021–22: ▲0.980 million
- 2022–23: ▲1.189 million
- 2023–24: ▲1.359 million
- 2024–25: ▲1.422 million

Key dates
- 4 April 1859: Opened

Other information
- External links: Departures; Facilities
- Coordinates: 51.3812°N 0.2451°W

Worcester Park railway station serves the Worcester Park area in south-west London, England. It is 10 miles 53 chains (17.2 km) down the line from London Waterloo. It opened in 1859 when the London and South Western Railway completed the Epsom branch. It was originally known as "Old Malden" and was renamed "Worcester Park" in 1862. Following substantial local housing development, the station was refurbished in the 1930s.

The station is in the Royal Borough of Kingston upon Thames, just to the west of the boundary with the London Borough of Sutton. The station is managed by South Western Railway, which also operates all trains serving it, and it is located in London fare zone 4.

== Facilities ==
The station has a small concession stand selling newspapers, magazines, coffee and pastries. There is a taxi office on the station estate; bus stops served by various Transport for London routes; a 24-hour, 90-space car park; cycle parking; a waiting room and toilets. The car park is largely sited on the area formerly used as a goods yard. The station has no automated barriers; however, Oyster Pre-Pay has been made available by National Rail at the station.

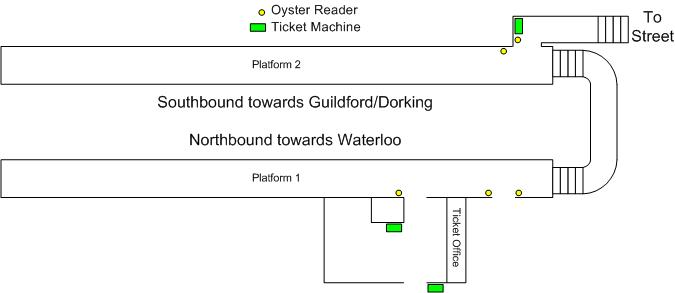
Station Oyster/Ticketing Layout

Disabled access used to be poor: the London bound platform was accessible, but access to the southbound platform was only via the pedestrian bridge or a long set of steps. However, in June 2014 a new passenger bridge was opened (coinciding with the removal of the old footbridge). The new bridge is equipped with lifts to permit disabled access between platforms.

== Services ==
All services at Worcester Park are operated by South Western Railway.

The typical off-peak service in trains per hour is:

- 2 tph to London Waterloo via Wimbledon
- 1 tph to Dorking
- 1 tph to Guildford

Additional services call at the station during the peak hours.

| Preceding station | National Rail | Following station |
|---|---|---|
| Motspur Park | South Western Railway Mole Valley Line | Stoneleigh |

== Landslide ==
In December 2007 there was a landslide on the line near the station which caused major disruptions and cancellations to all services passing through the station for one week.

== Future ==
Under Transport for London's (TfL) initial plans for Crossrail 2, it was proposed that those would stop only at certain hub stations. Worcester Park was not scheduled to be a hub station, the nearest being at Motspur Park, the next station to the north. A petition for Worcester Park to be a designated stop, signed by 1,129 signatories, was presented to the Mayor of London on 15 January 2014.

In October 2015, TfL announced a set of local consultations would take place and their amended proposal provides that Crossrail 2 trains will now stop at all stations on the routes to the south and west of Wimbledon. Construction of the line is currently on hold due to a lack of available funding.

== Connections ==
London Buses routes 151, 213 and S3, Superloop route SL7, school routes 613 and 627 and non-TfL route E16 serve the station.
