= Dorking railway station =

Railway station in Surrey, England

Coordinates: 51.241°N 0.324°W

Dorking
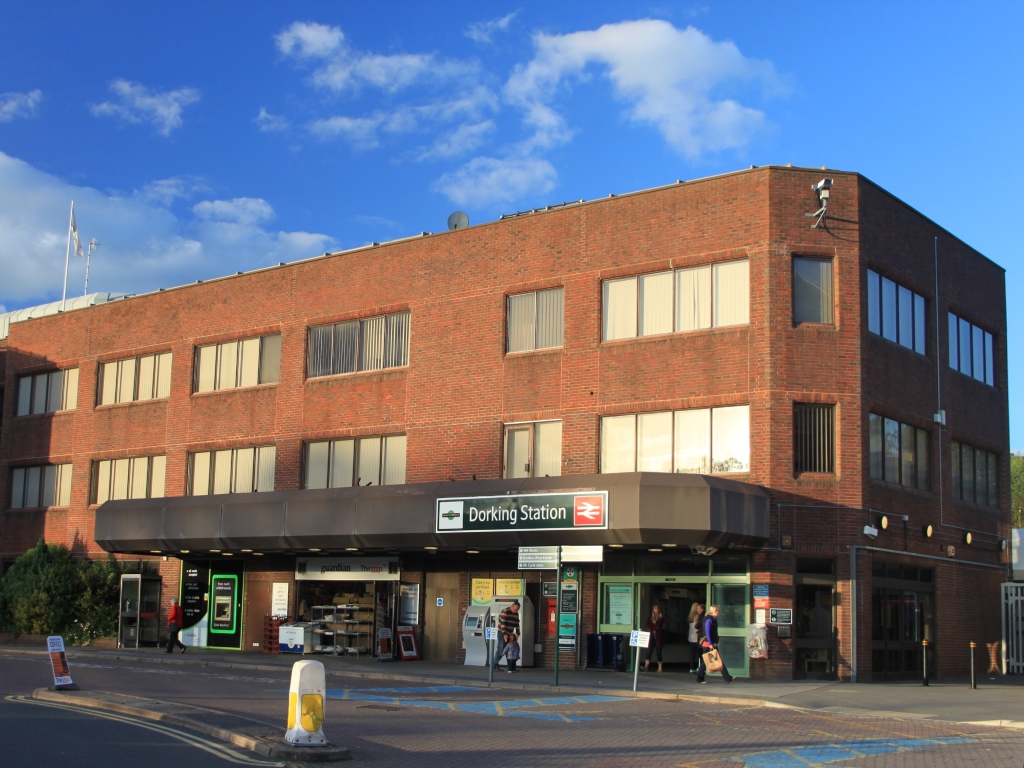

General information
- Location: Dorking, District of Mole Valley; England
- Grid reference: TQ170504
- Managed by: Southern
- Platforms: 3

Other information
- Station code: DKG
- Classification: DfT category C1

Key dates
- 11 March 1867: Opened
- 9 July 1923: Renamed Dorking North
- 7 November 1966: Goods yard closed
- 6 May 1968: Renamed Dorking
- 23 August 1982: New station building opened

Passengers
- 2020/21: ▼0.262 million
- Interchange: ▼28,575
- 2021/22: ▲0.690 million
- Interchange: ▲67,622
- 2022/23: ▲0.695 million
- Interchange: ▲74,693
- 2023/24: ▲0.765 million
- Interchange: ▲79,175
- 2024/25: ▲0.835 million
- Interchange: ▼49,192
Location
Notes
- Passenger statistics from the Office of Rail and Road

Dorking railway station, also known by National Rail as Dorking (Main), is a railway station in Dorking, Surrey, England. Located on the Mole Valley line, it is 22 miles 8 chains (35.6 km) down the line from London Waterloo (via Wimbledon). The station is one of three that serve the town of Dorking, alongside Dorking Deepdene and Dorking West stations (both on the North Downs Line). Dorking and Dorking Deepdene stations are within walking distance of each other and interchange between them on a through ticket is permitted.

The station is managed by Southern, which is one of two companies serving the station alongside South Western Railway. It has three platforms, numbered 1–3 from left to right when looking towards London; each platform is long enough to accommodate 10 carriages. The platforms are connected by both a subway and a footbridge, with lift access available to all platforms.

== History ==
=== Construction ===
The Mole Gap between Dorking and Leatherhead is one of the few natural breaches in the North Downs and its potential as a rail corridor was realised as early as 1830 when a line linking London to Brighton was proposed. In 1845–46, the Direct London and Portsmouth Railway was authorised by Parliament to run south from Epsom to Dorking on to Godalming, Havant and Portsmouth. The scheme failed to attract sufficient investment and was dropped in favour of the Woking, Guildford and Havant route from London Waterloo.

The first railway line to link Dorking with London was the independently promoted Reading, Guildford and Reigate Railway proposed in 1845-6, authorised by Acts of Parliament in 1846 and 1847. This became the line known today as the North Downs Line.

By 1859 the London, Brighton and South Coast Railway and London and South Western Railway had built a joint line to Leatherhead from Epsom, where their tracks separated (the former heading for London Bridge, the latter for London Waterloo. An independent Horsham, Dorking and Leatherhead Railway was set up and promoted by interested local parties (principally from Horsham) to link the three towns. The railway was approved by Act of Parliament in July 1862, but only from a junction with the South Eastern Railway's North Downs Line, 100 yards (91 m) to the east of Dorking Deepdene, to the LBSCR's Arun Valley line at Horsham.

A year later, in July 1863, LBSCR secured authority to build the line from its station at Leatherhead to make a connection with the line from Horsham. The line to Leatherhead was opened on 11 March 1867; however, the connection with the line from Horsham was not made until 1 May 1867. Initially services ran from London Bridge to Brighton via Sutton and Steyning, four times per day in each direction.

On 27 July 1887, Betchworth Tunnel to the south of the station collapsed. This meant that trains were unable to run towards Horsham until the repairs were completed on 1 March 1888.

=== Electrification ===
The Southern Railway, formed in 1923, began an extensive programme of electrification of their suburban lines. The line from Waterloo to Dorking was electrified using the 660 V third rail system in 1925 and regular half-hourly semi-fast services were introduced on 12 July 1925 to run seven days per week. The 22 1/2 mi (36 km) journey to Waterloo originally took 45 minutes, although this was considerably lengthened when trains began to stop at all stations shortly afterwards. Additional hourly electric services to London Bridge via Mitcham Junction and Tulse Hill began on 3 March 1929; the 25 mi (40 km) journey took 53 minutes.

The mid-Sussex electrification of 1938 resulted in the express steam services from Portsmouth and Bognor Regis being replaced by electric services which were routed through Dorking, calling only at Sutton and London Victoria. These gave commuters from Dorking their fastest ever link to London Victoria – 34 minutes during peak hours. Some steam services to other unelectrified lines (such as the Steyning Line) continued until their final withdrawal in January 1964, during the closures associated with the Beeching Axe.

In the timetable change of May 1978 the mid-Sussex and Portsmouth express services were routed via Three Bridges to serve Gatwick Airport, and the off-peak service provision to Dorking was reduced to two semi-fast services from Victoria per hour, with services to Horsham running every two hours. Now the average journey time to London termini takes a passenger 55 minutes.

The route to Horsham was neglected for some years during the 1980s, with shuttle services between Dorking and Horsham operating every two hours at off-peak times. In contrast, the service pattern now provided is one train an hour through from London to Horsham (headcode 84). The off-peak service provision of two trains from London Bridge to Horsham via Sutton and Dorking existed for a number of years from about 1985 but ceased by 2000. The former Horsham–Waterloo trains via Dorking (headcode 15) had ceased as early as 1980.

== Signal box ==
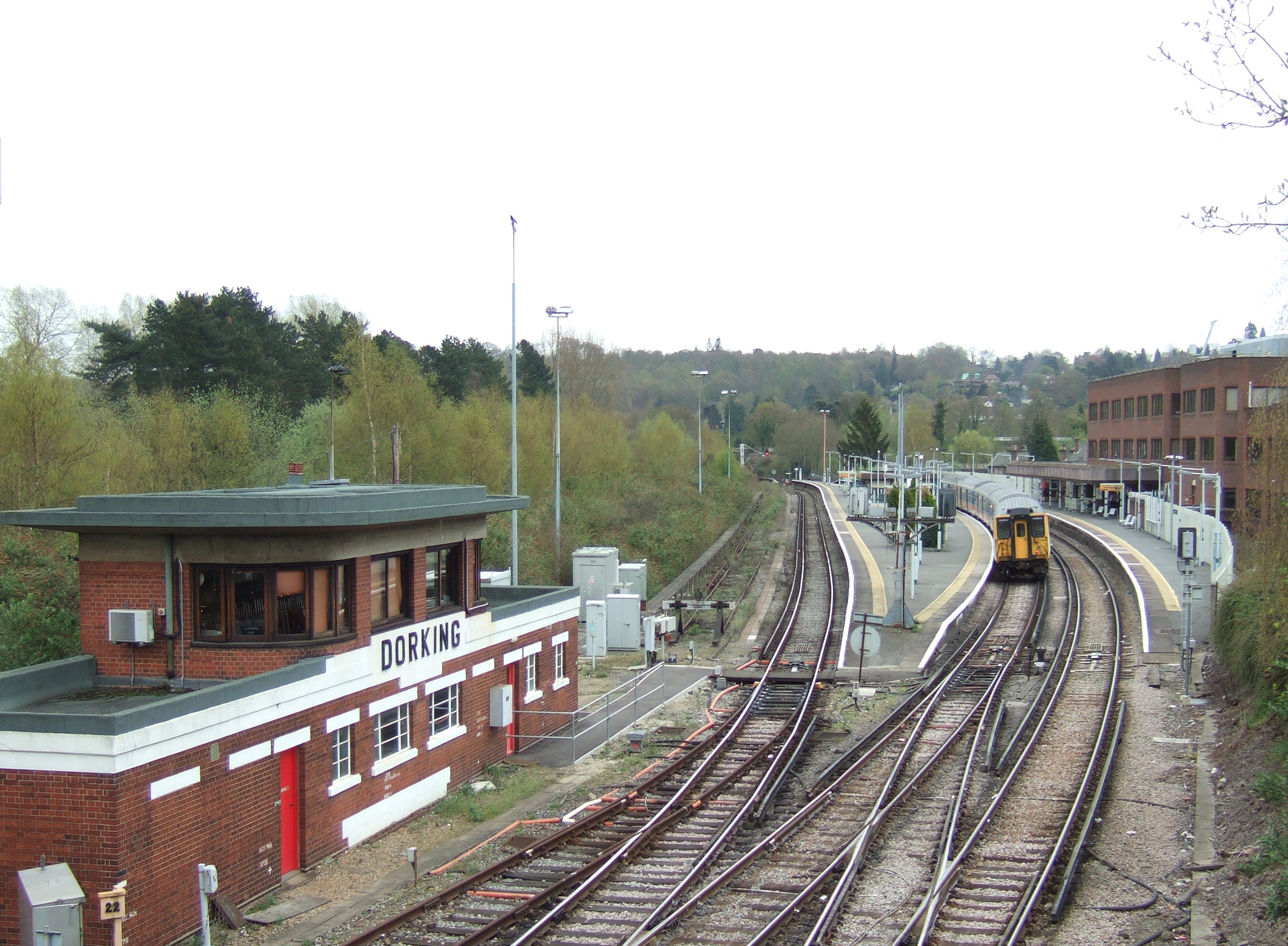
View from the north (April 2006) showing the signal box (left)

The resignalling scheme of 1938 introduced three-aspect colour signals to replace the original semaphore signals. A new signal box was constructed and opened on 15 May 1938, ahead of the introduction of electric express services. It is one of many built in the Odeon style by the Southern Railway during the 1930s. The original frame was an A2 type Westinghouse with 44 levers. The box controls the line from Box Hill & Westhumble to just south of Dorking station. It controls one of the last examples of a Southern Railway "Dummy" Signal, which controls the exit of the carriage siding.

== Services ==
Services at Dorking are operated by Southern and South Western Railway using Class 377 and 455 EMUs.

The typical off-peak service is:

- 2 tph to London Victoria via Sutton
- 1 tph to London Waterloo via Wimbledon
- 1 tph to Horsham

Before the COVID-19 pandemic, South Western Railway served Dorking 2 tph to London Waterloo via Wimbledon but this service has not been restored and only sees 1 tph as of 2024

On Saturday evenings (after approximately 18:45) and on Sundays, there is no service south of Dorking to Horsham.

On Saturday evenings there are two trains to West Croydon, The 23:07 and the 23:37 calling at all stops except from Ewell East. Operated by Southern

Unlike other towns in the London commuter belt, Dorking does not receive any express services, which gives overcapacity towards the suburban terminus due to the longer journey times and overcrowding on the inner-city phase of journeys.

Preceding station	National Rail	Following station
Leatherhead or Box Hill & Westhumble	Southern Sutton & Mole Valley Lines	Holmwood or Terminus
Box Hill & Westhumble	South Western Railway Mole Valley line	Terminus

== Future proposals ==
In November 2018, the Dorking Town Forum submitted a proposal to Network Rail for a £21 million upgrade of the Dorking station area. While the majority of the proposal focuses on improvements to nearby Dorking Deepdene station, the plan also envisages the construction of a new direct 100-metre (330 ft)-long foot link between Dorking and Dorking Deepdene, which would allow for easier interchanging between the two stations.
