= Sutton and Mole Valley lines =

Railway line in the UK

Sutton & Mole Valley lines
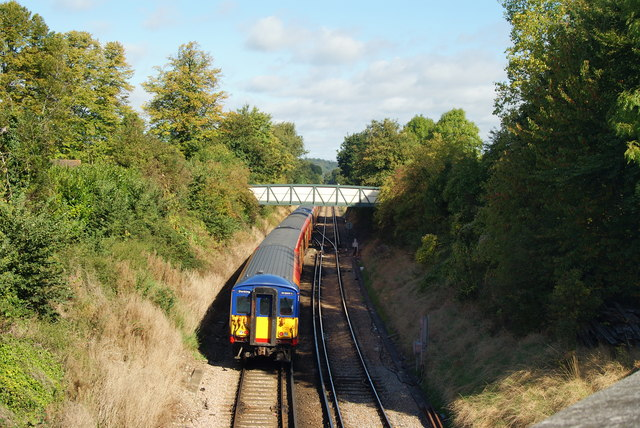
- A South West Trains EMU heads towards London

Overview
- Status: Operational
- Owner: Network Rail
- Locale: Greater London; Surrey; South East England

Service
- Type: Commuter rail
- System: National Rail
- Operator(s): South Western Railway; Southern; Thameslink
- Rolling stock: Class 377 "Electrostar"; Class 450; Class 458 "Juniper"; Class 700; Class 701

Technical
- Track gauge: 1,435 mm (4 ft 8 1/2 in) standard gauge
- Electrification: 750 V DC third rail

The Sutton and Mole Valley lines were constructed between 1847 and 1868 by the London, Brighton and South Coast Railway, the London and South Western Railway and the LBSCR-sponsored Horsham, Dorking and Leatherhead Railway.

== Services ==
Services include commuter services in South London, Surrey and West Sussex operated by Southern, usually from London Victoria to Horsham via Sutton and Dorking. The South Western Railway services are operated by Class 455 trains.

The Southern services use Class 377s. Southern previously used Class 455 trains on the line until 2022, as well as Class 456 trains until 2013. South West Trains acquired the Class 456s in 2014 and re-released these trains on the line later that year, but they were withdrawn in 2022.

South Western Railway operates services between London Waterloo and Leatherhead via Raynes Park and Epsom. Half continue along the main line to Dorking, others run to Guildford via Bookham and Effingham Junction.

Thameslink operates services from Tulse Hill to Sutton as part of the Thameslink route to London Blackfriars and Luton using Class 700 trains.

== Technical information ==
The route from Raynes Park to Horsham via Epsom and Dorking (including the Bookham Branch) is known to commuters as the Mole Valley Line – seven out of the 15 stations are in the Surrey district of Mole Valley. The full title Sutton and Mole Valley Lines is used for the lines north of Epsom via Sutton. Confusingly, all Southern services that terminate or call at Sutton are branded as Sutton and Mole Valley Line services.

The lines which form the route include (in order of construction):

- The Wallington & Portsmouth lines from West Croydon to Epsom via Sutton
- The Portsmouth line from Epsom to Leatherhead
- The Epsom line from Raynes Park to Epsom
- The Portsmouth and Dorking lines from Leatherhead to Horsham via Dorking
- The Bookham Branch from Leatherhead to Effingham Junction
- The Portsmouth line from Peckham Rye to Sutton via Mitcham Junction

None of the lines leads directly to a London terminus, but services use the South West Main Line to access London Waterloo, the Brighton Main Line to access London Victoria and the Brighton Main Line (via Norwood Junction) or the South London Line (via South Bermondsey) to access London Bridge.

The following lines are associated with the route, but are considered separate:

- The Chessington line from Motspur Park to Chessington South
- The Epsom Downs line from Sutton to Epsom Downs
- The St Helier line from Sutton to Wimbledon

The lines are electrified at 750 V DC third rail. Class 455 electrical multiple units are used, with semi-fast and stopping services to Horsham from London Victoria frequently operated by Class 377 Electrostars. Up to the early 1980s, express services to Littlehampton and Bognor Regis were routed along these lines and called at Sutton, Dorking, Horsham and stations to the south coast along the Arun Valley Line & West Coastway Line.

The maximum speed is 50 mph (80 km/h), with 20 mph (32 km/h) restrictions at Clapham Junction, Streatham Junction, Mitcham Junction, Raynes Park, West Croydon, Sutton and Epsom; 30 mph (48 km/h) at Dorking and the approach to London Victoria; and 75 mph (121 km/h) between Box Hill and Westhumble and Dorking, and between Dorking and Holmwood. Signalling between London Victoria and Ewell East (including the Epsom Downs Branch) is controlled by London Victoria (VC); between London Waterloo and Box Hill and Westhumble by Wimbledon (W); between Box Hill and Westhumble and Warnham by Dorking (CBK); and between West Croydon & Waddon and Warnham & Horsham by Three Bridges Signalling Centre (T).

Platform lengths have been extended recently at most stations with twelve-car length platforms at Sutton, Horsham and Dorking and ten-car platforms at most other stations including Ashtead, Ewell East and Epsom.

== History of the route ==
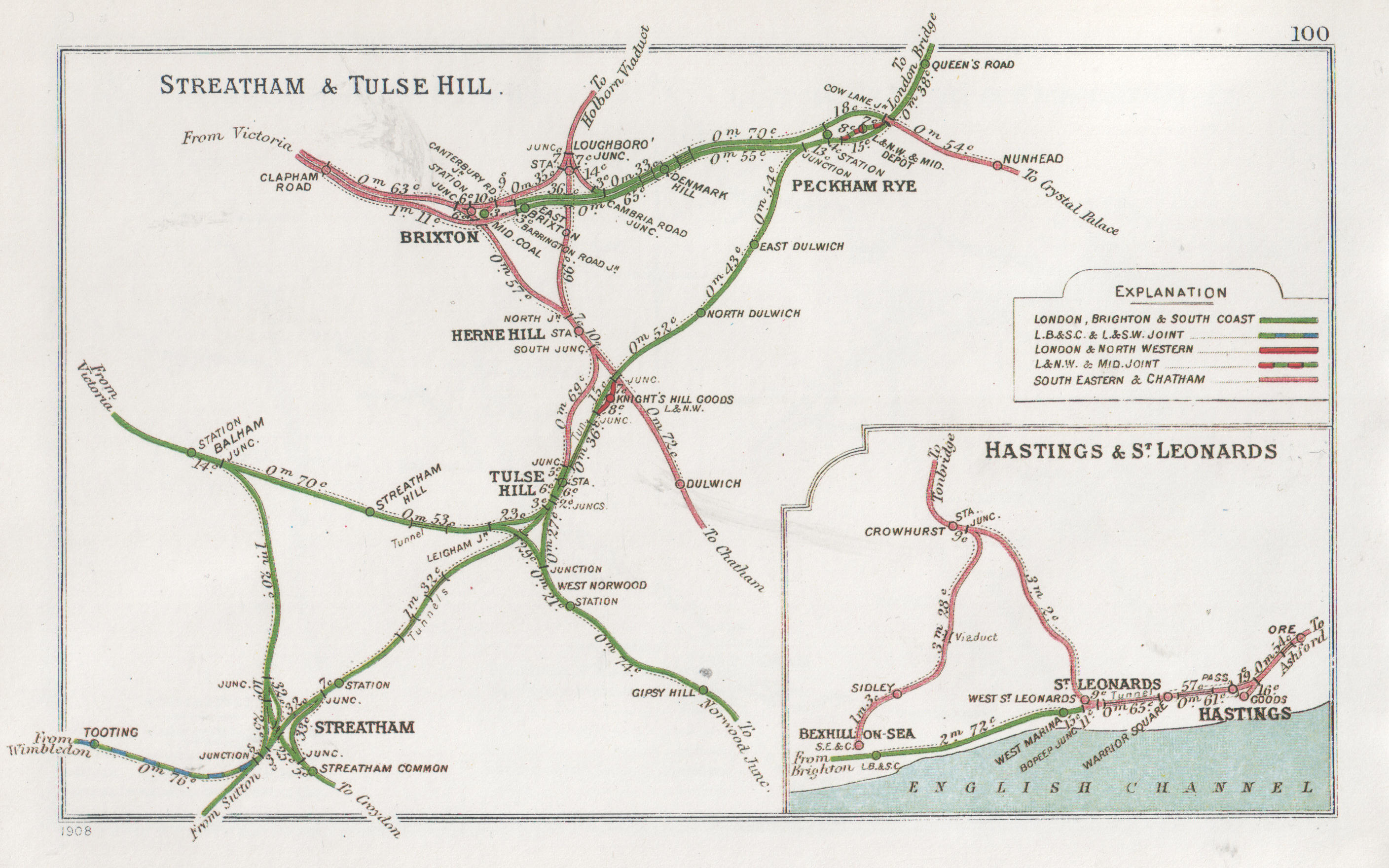
A 1908 Railway Clearing House map, showing part of the Sutton & Mole Valley lines though South London

The lines used were the result of several schemes:

- 1847: West Croydon to Sutton and Epsom railway opened by the London, Brighton and South Coast Railway (LB&SCR)
- 1856: Epsom and Leatherhead Railway authorised.
- 1857: Wimbledon and Dorking Railway authorised under the auspices of the London and South Western Railway (L&SWR), reached no further than Epsom. This is why services are run by South West Trains.
- Autumn 1857: rival schemes to connect Shoreham Harbour with Horsham and Dorking. The London, Brighton and South Coast Railway (LBSCR) was eventually successful, on 1 August 1859.
- 1 February 1859: Epsom and Leatherhead Railway opened
- 4 March 1859: Wimbledon and Dorking Railway opened to Epsom by the L&SWR
- 1 July 1861: Shoreham – Horsham opened
- 17 July 1862: Horsham, Dorking and Leatherhead Railway (LBSCR sponsored) authorised. Opened in two sections:

11 March 1867: Leatherhead to Dorking
1 May 1867: Dorking to Horsham

- 22 May 1865 Epsom Downs Branch opened.
- 1 October 1868 The mainline route from London to Sutton via Hackbridge opened.
- 2 February 1885 Bookham branch and Guildford New Line (route via Cobham) open. Epsom and Leatherhead linked with Guildford by rail for the first time.
- 12 July 1925 Third rail electrified services begin between London Waterloo and Dorking North/Bookham and the Guildford New Line.
- July 1927 Leatherhead LSWR station closes – from 10th, all trains use LBSCR station, thanks to new spur.
- 3 March 1929 Third rail electrified services start between London Victoria and Epsom via Mitcham Jct and London Bridge and Epsom via Tulse Hill and Mitcham Jct. Epsom Town (LBSCR) station closed and services concentrated at new station on approximately the site of the former LSWR one.
- 1938 Dorking/Three Bridges to Horsham electrified. New signalling installed and new station built at Horsham. Colour light signalling through Dorking North (and new signalbox opened) from 15 May. Public third rail services start on 3 July.
- 1978 Portsmouth Harbour/Bognor Regis express services diverted via Gatwick Airport, and the lines downgraded including the removal of the passing loops at Cheam. A peak hour service continues, stopping at Sutton and Dorking.
- 1984 Dorking and Sutton lose their peak hour 12-coach fast trains to London and the south coast.
- 1997 Thameslink 2000 is announced with promises of a King's Lynn to Guildford service via London Bridge and West Croydon and an upgraded Wimbledon loop service to St Albans, with 12-coach trains.
- 2013 Platforms at intermediate stations along the route are extended to accommodate 10-coach suburban trains. Stations along the Epsom Downs branch have their platforms extended to accommodate 10-coach trains. Southern Trains introduces five car Class 377/6 on the route.
- May 2018 A new timetable comes into operation on the route affecting all services. The Epsom Downs line sees an uplift in off-peak services increasing to two trains per hour Monday to Saturday and a Sunday timetable is introduced. Also, improved connections between Epsom and West Croydon having 2 trains per hour, with the introduction of the all-day London Bridge to Epsom service.
- May 2019: Box Hill & Westhumble is now served by 3 trains per hour in each direction as South Western Railway now stop here during off peak time (previously only during the peak).

== Accidents and incidents ==
- On 4 November 1942, two electric multiple units collided at Waddon due to a signalman's error. Two people were killed.
- On 6 November 1947, an electric multiple unit collided with another at Motspur Park due to errors by a fogsignalman. Four people were killed and twelve were injured.

== Tunnels ==
There are two tunnels, built between 1860 and 1867.

Mickleham Tunnel is midway between Leatherhead and Box Hill & Westhumble. It is 524 yards (479 m) long and runs through the lower chalk of Norbury Park, entering the hillside immediately north of one of the three viaducts over the River Mole. Restrictions imposed by the landowner, Thomas Grissell, meant that vertical ventilation shafts could not be constructed and the tunnel portals were given lavish architectural treatment.

Betchworth Tunnel is 1/4 mile (400 m) south of Dorking. It is 385 yards (352 m) long with a maximum gradient of 1 in 80 (1.25 per cent). It runs through the upper greensand of the Deepdene Ridge to the east of the town. Construction difficulties delayed the opening south of Dorking. It collapsed on 27 July 1887, remaining closed for over six months.

== See also ==
- Epsom Downs branch line
- Sutton Loop Line
- Chessington branch line
- South West Main Line
- Brighton Main Line
- New Guildford line
- North Downs Line
- Arun Valley line
