= Birkbeck station =

National Rail station and Tramlink tram stop in London, England

Birkbeck
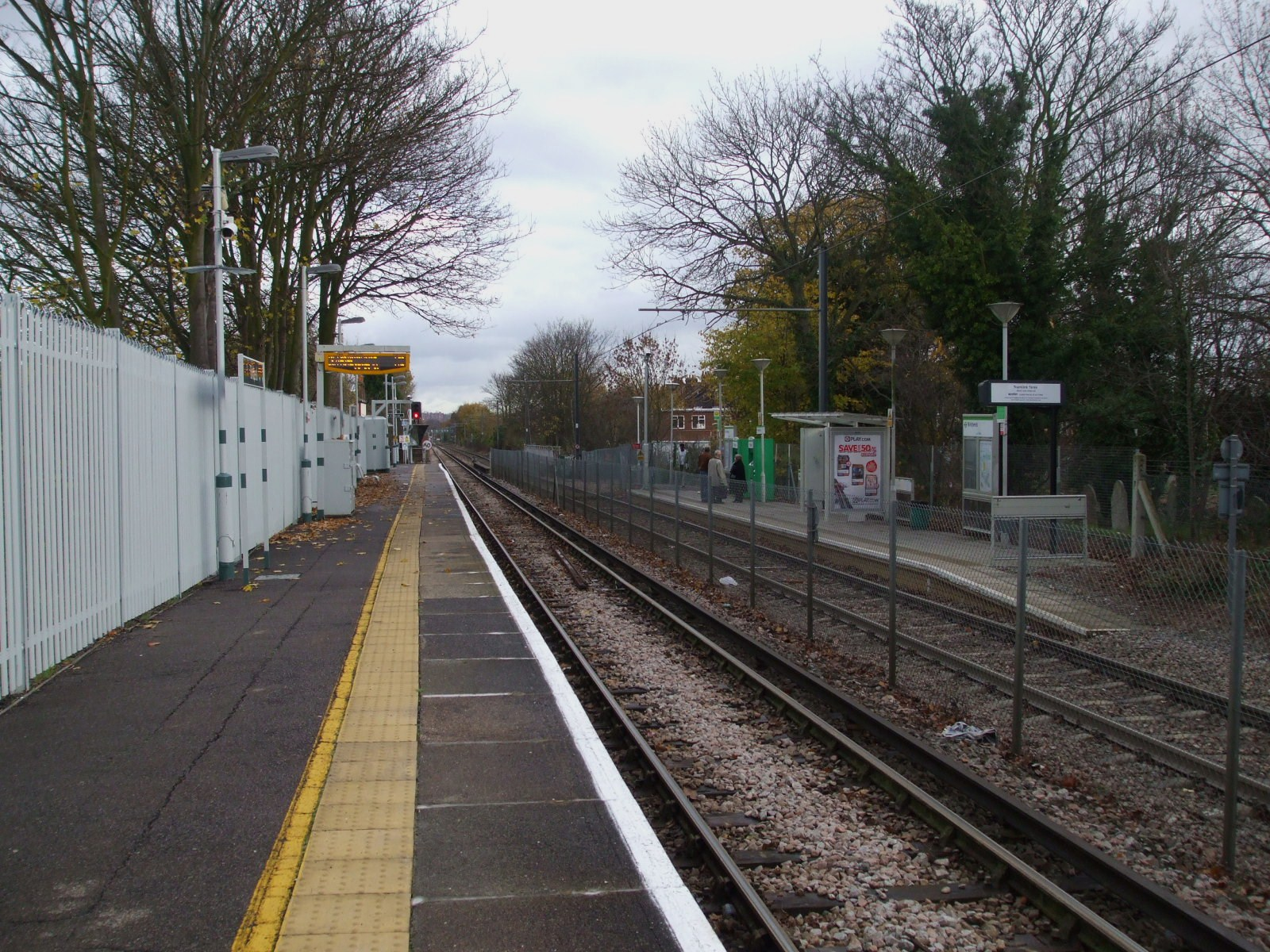
- Station in 2008
- Interactive map of Birkbeck

General information
- Location: Anerley
- Local authority: London Borough of Bromley
- Managed by: Southern
- Station code: BIK
- DfT category: F2
- Number of platforms: 1 (main line); 1 (Tramlink)
- Fare zone: 4

National Rail annual entry and exit
- 2020–21: ▼33,850
- 2021–22: ▲55,104
- 2022–23: ▲71,244
- 2023–24: ▲82,390
- 2024–25: ▲0.105 million

Railway companies
- Original company: Southern Railway
- Post-grouping: Southern Railway

Key dates
- 1858: Line opens
- 1915: Line closes
- 3 March 1929: Line reopens
- 2 March 1930: Opening of station
- 1983: Station reduced to single platform
- 2000: Tramlink starts

Other information
- External links: Departures; Facilities
- Coordinates: 51.4039°N 0.0568°W

Birkbeck is a railway station and light rail stop in the London Borough of Bromley in the southern suburbs of London. On the rail network it is 10 miles 26 chains (16.6 km) measured from London Victoria. It is located on Elmers End Road (A214) and alongside Beckenham Crematorium.

== History and layout ==
=== National Rail ===
The line through Birkbeck was opened as a double-track branch of the West End of London and Crystal Palace Railway in 1858, but was closed from 1860 to 1863 and again in 1915 until reopened in 1929 as part of the Southern Railway electrification scheme. A year later, on 2 March 1930, a new station was opened, to serve a growing suburban area, and named after the Birkbeck Freehold Land Society, whose name derived from the Yorkshire philanthropist George Birkbeck. In 1983 the line between Beckenham Junction and Bromley Junction was reduced to single track and the former up line and up platform was abandoned. The track was subsequently removed and the station building demolished.

The tracks in the station are located well above street level; the National Rail buildings were damaged by fire in 1983.

When the Croydon Tramlink was constructed a single line through the station was laid using the trackbed of the former BR up line and the former BR up platform was rebuilt. The National Rail line is served by a high level platform to the north of the track, whilst the Croydon Tramlink rail line is served by a low level platform to the south of the track. Each platform has its own access from the street, and the only access between the two platforms is via the street, with a fence between the two tracks to deter any attempt to cross the lines.

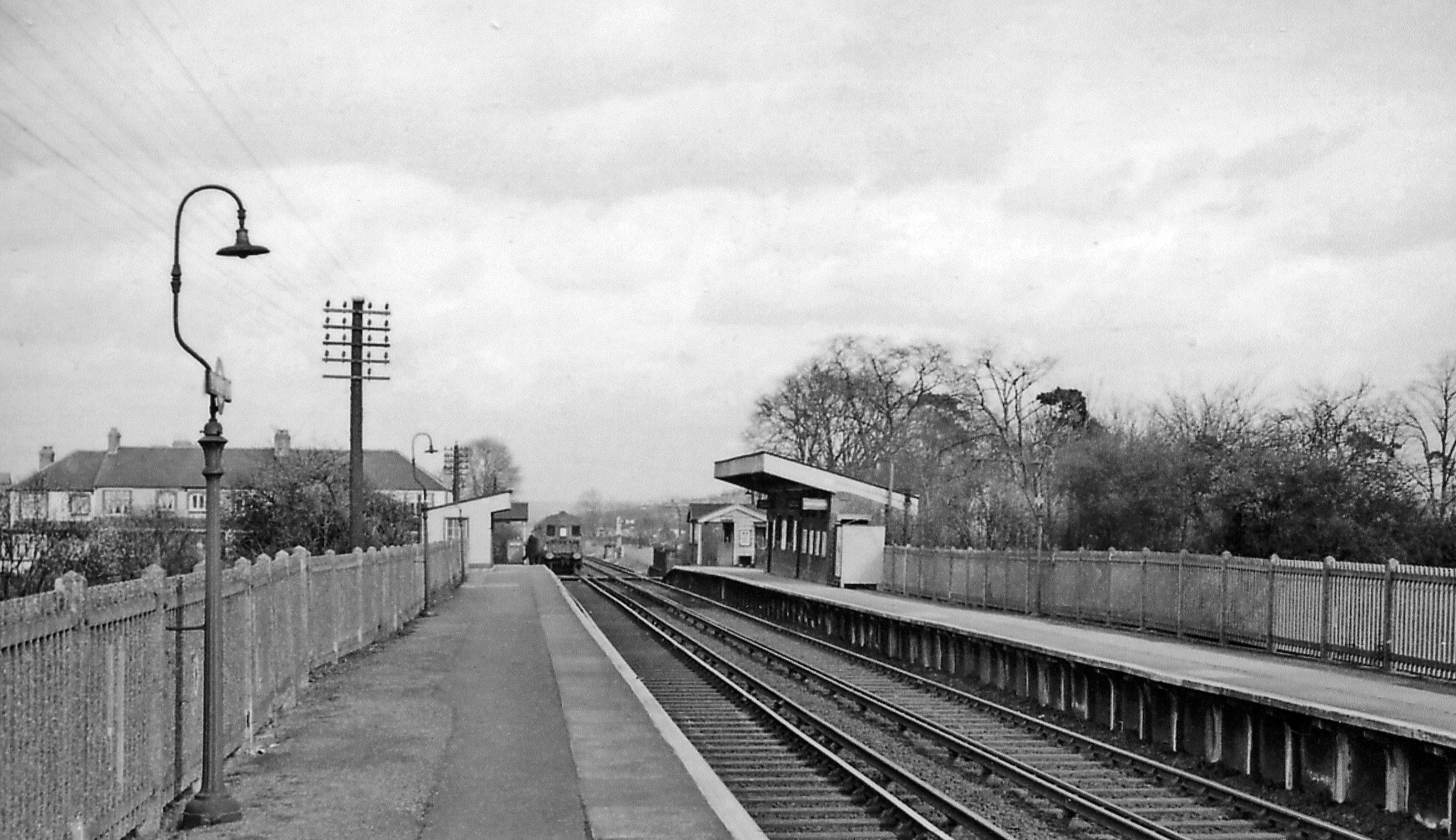
Birkbeck Station in 1961

=== Tramlink ===
The one-platform Tramlink stop opened in 2000. This platform is used for both services which run to Beckenham Junction and Wimbledon.

A proposed line alternative through Birkbeck station from Crystal Palace railway station to Beckenham Junction was considered for conversion to a Tramlink route but Transport for London has dropped the plan on the grounds that the existing rail service is adequate.

== Services ==
=== National Rail ===
All National Rail services at Birkbeck are operated by Southern using Class 377 EMUs.

The typical off-peak service in trains per hour is:

- 2 tph to London Bridge via Crystal Palace
- 2 tph to Beckenham Junction

During the evenings (after approximately 20:00), the service is reduced to hourly in each direction.

No National Rail services call at the station on Sundays.

=== London Trams ===
Tram services at Birkbeck are operated by Tramlink. The tram stop is served by trams every 10 minutes between Beckenham Junction and Wimbledon via Croydon. This is reduced to a tram every 15 minutes on Saturday early mornings and evenings, and on Sundays.

Services are operated using Bombardier CR4000 and Stadler Variobahn model low-floor trams.

Preceding station	National Rail	Following station
Crystal Palace	Southern Crystal Palace Line Monday-Saturday only	Beckenham Junction
Preceding station	Tramlink	Following station
Harrington Road towards Wimbledon	Tramlink Wimbledon to Beckenham Junction	Avenue Road towards Beckenham Junction

== Connections ==
The stop is served by London Buses routes 354 and 356 which provide connections to Beckenham, Bromley, Elmers End, Penge and Sydenham.

Free interchange for journeys made within an hour is available between bus services and between buses and trams is available at Birkbeck as part of Transport for London's Hopper Fare.

== Gallery ==
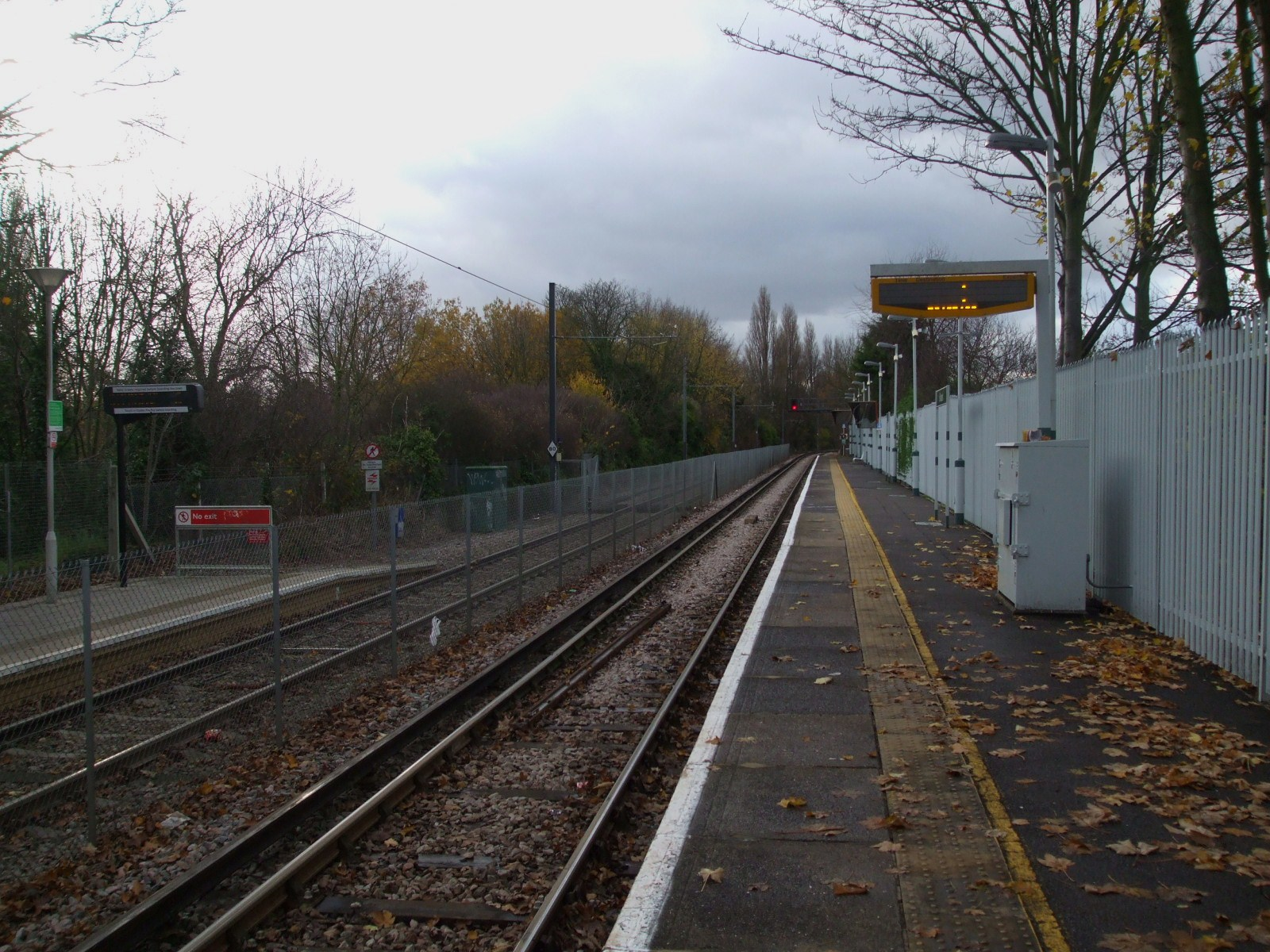
Main line looking west

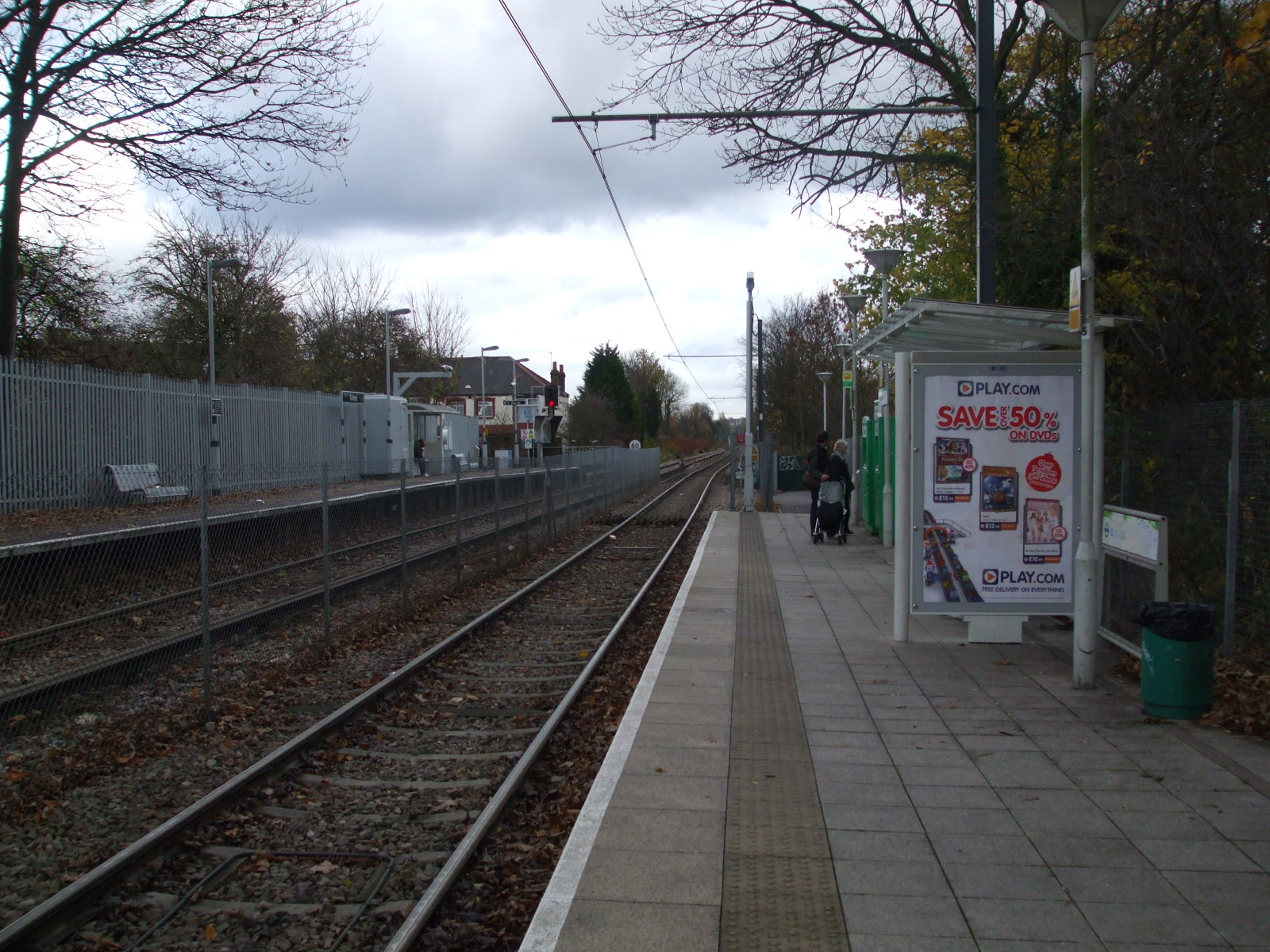
Tramlink looking east

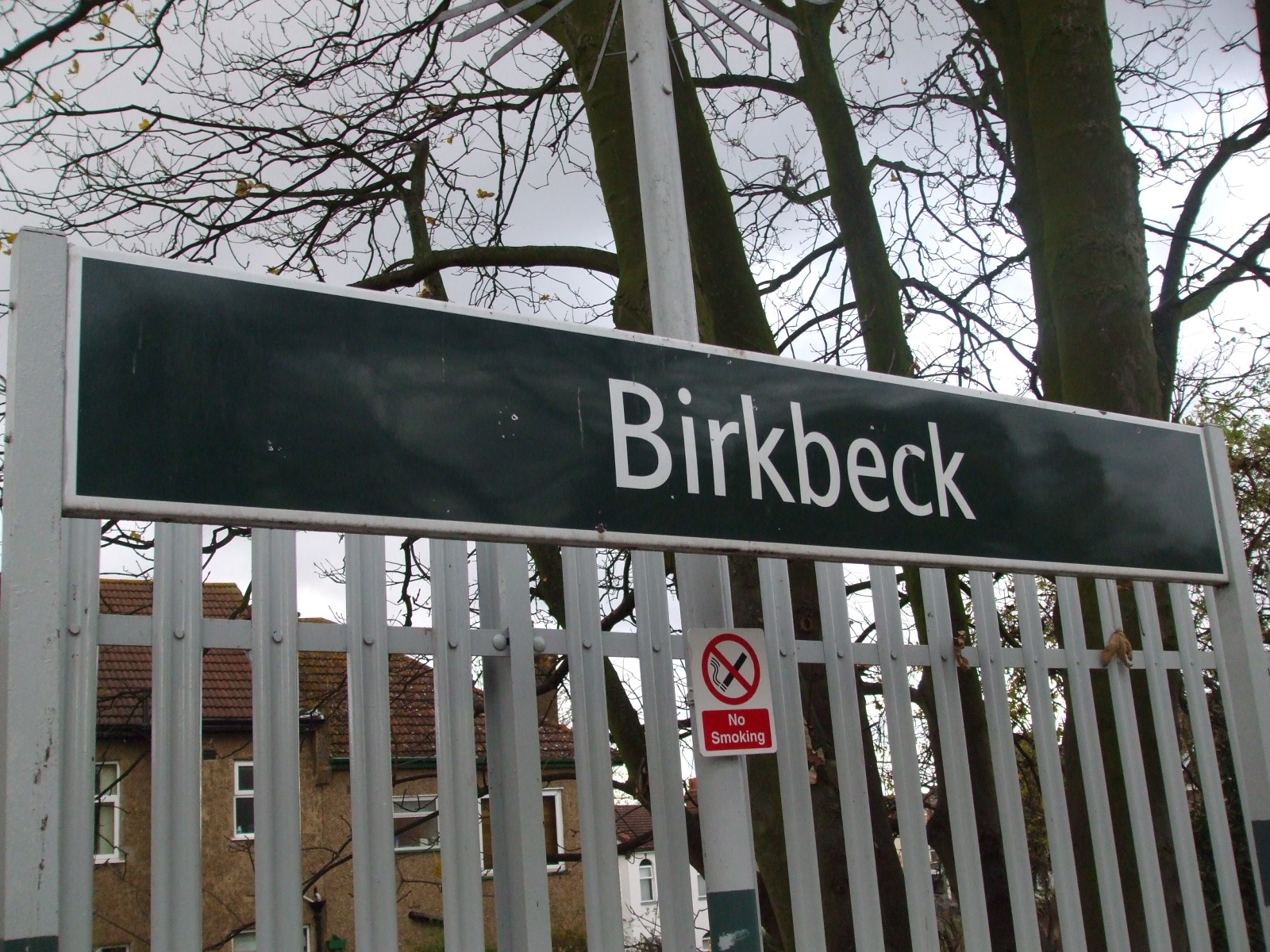
Main line platform sign

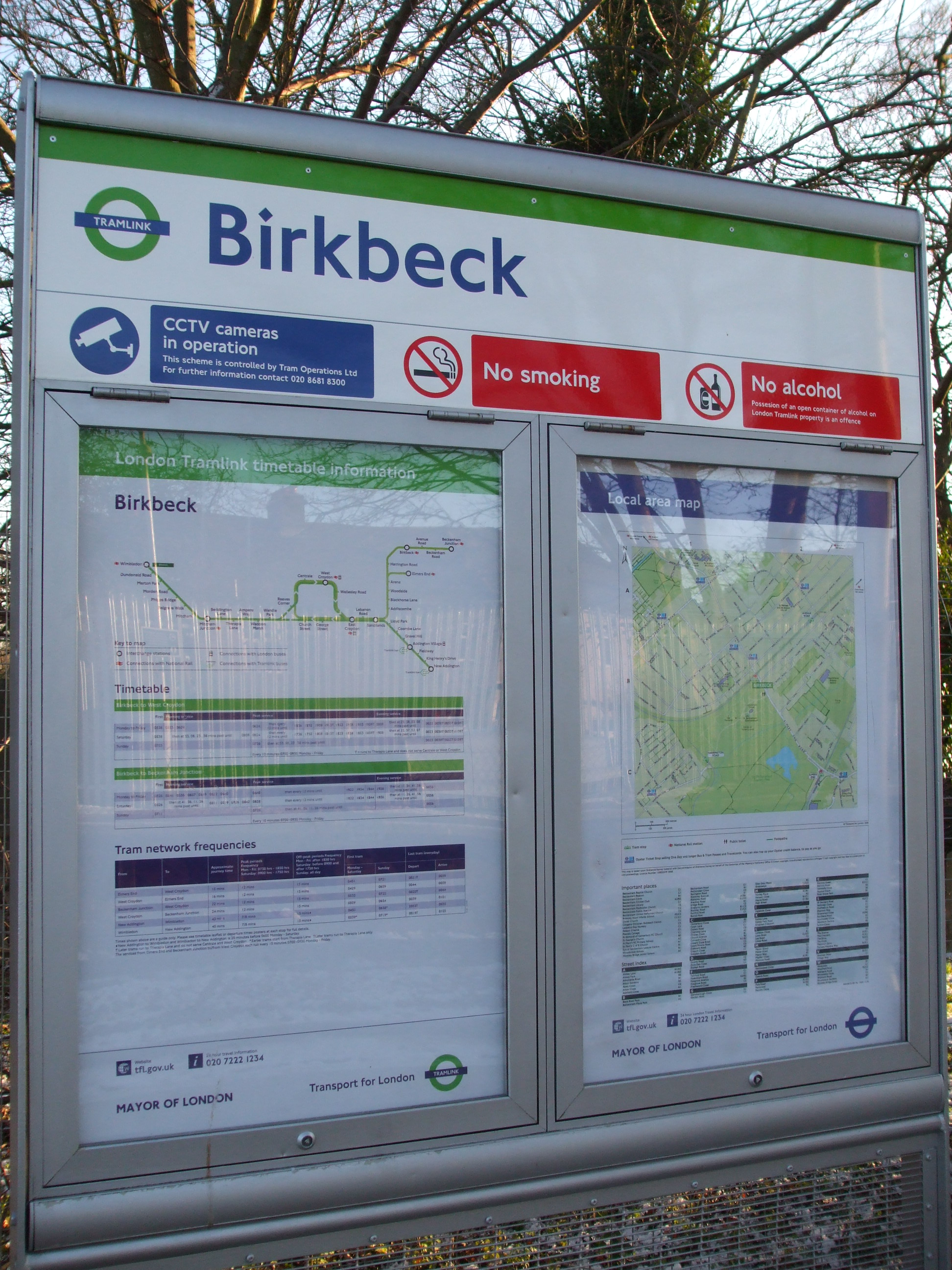
Tramlink platform sign
