= Anerley Town Hall =

Municipal building in London, England

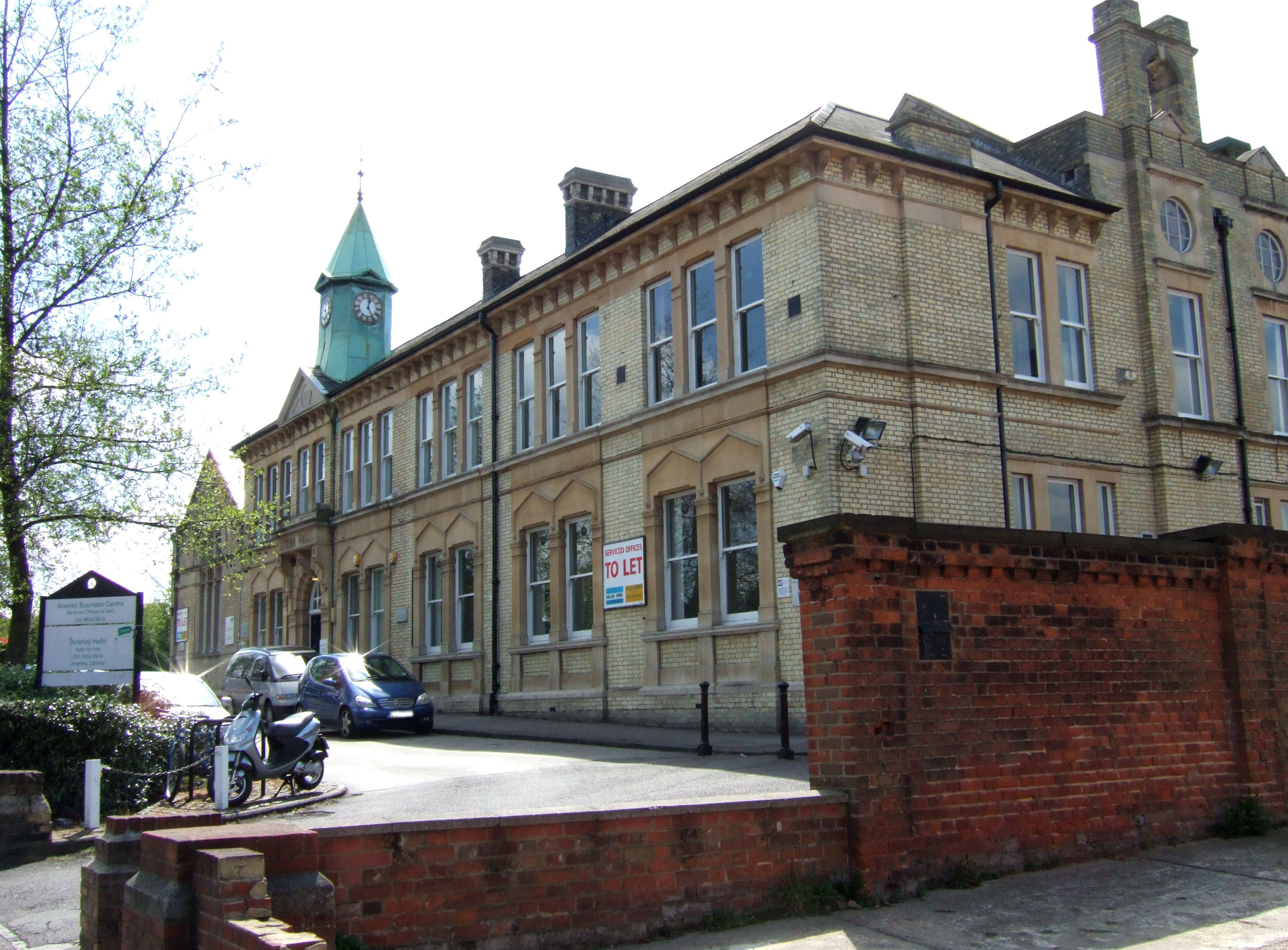
- Anerley Town Hall

- Shown in Bromley
- 51.4117°N 0.0673°W
- Location: Anerley Road, Anerley

History
- Built: 1879

Site notes
- Architect: George Elkington
- Architectural style: Italianate style

Anerley Town Hall is a municipal building in Anerley Road, Anerley, London. It is a locally listed building.

== History ==
The building was commissioned by the Parish of St Paul's Church, Anerley as their vestry hall. The area chosen for the new building was part of a 56 acres (23 ha) site occupied by the North Surrey District School.

The town hall was designed by George Elkington in the Italianate style and built by J & C Bowyer, builders, at a cost of £4,341; it was officially opened on 30 April 1879. The original design involved three bays with a central doorway on the ground floor; there were two windows above the doorway and three windows in each of the other bays on the first floor; a zinc-clad clock-tower was erected on the roof (containing a clock by Messrs Smith of Clerkenwell). The building was faced with white gault bricks, with covered stone dressings, and the roofs were of Bangor slate. The assembly hall was set to the southeast of the main building and featured an unusual hammerbeam roof with the beams connected by wrought iron rods.

The building became the headquarters of the new Penge Urban District formed in 1900, and was significantly extended by the creation of three extra bays to the northwest at a cost of £3,229 to incorporate a council chamber and committee rooms in 1911. Further changes were made to create a courtroom for petty sessions in 1925.

The town hall continued to be the headquarters of the urban council for much of the 20th century but ceased to be the local seat of government when the enlarged London Borough of Bromley was formed in 1965. It was extended with a new structure at the rear to accommodate a public library and also to create additional space for Bromley Council's housing and social services departments in 1987. The main building was converted into a series of fully furnished commercial offices in November 2003. The library (known as Anerley Library) closed in July 2014 with Penge Library opening in Green Lane in September 2014; This allowed the town hall's former library area to be hired out for family events and children's parties.

Crystal Palace Community Trust, a local charity, obtained a 40-year lease over the building with the intention of managing it as a community asset from August 2017. Items of interest in the town hall include the first-rate book dated 18 June 1827 which records the first-rate payment by William Sanderson, a resident at "Anerley House", the first house to be built on the former Penge Common.
