= Avenue Road tram stop =

Tramlink tram stop in London, England

Avenue Road
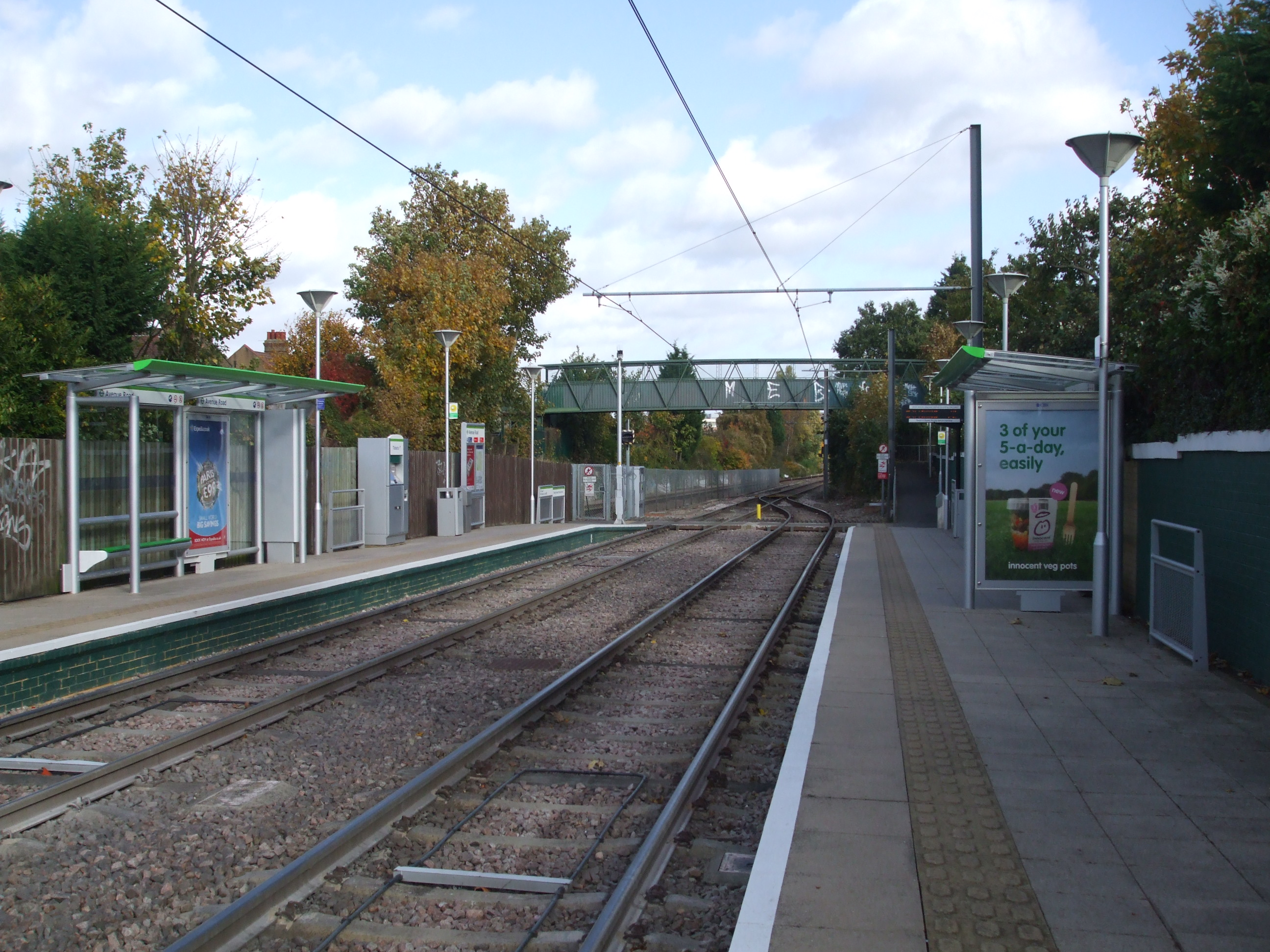
- Looking east

General information
- Location: Penge, Bromley
- Coordinates: 51.4067°N 0.04968°W
- Operator: Tramlink
- Platforms: 2

Construction
- Structure type: At-grade
- Accessible: Yes

Other information
- Status: Unstaffed
- Website: Official website

History
- Opened: 23 May 2000
Location
- Location in Bromley

Avenue Road tram stop is a light rail stop in the London Borough of Bromley in the London suburbs. It is located on Avenue Road in a mainly residential area between Penge and Beckenham.

== Platforms ==
The tram stop is situated on a short passing loop within an otherwise single track section of Tramlink, where that system runs alongside the National Rail line between Crystal Palace and Beckenham Junction stations. The tram stop has platforms on each side of the two tracks of the loop. The National Rail line passes behind the northernmost of these platforms, but that line has no platform.

== Services ==
Avenue Road is served by tram services operated by Tramlink. The tram stop is served by trams every 10 minutes between Beckenham Junction and Wimbledon via Croydon.

On Saturday evenings and Sundays, the service operates every 15 minutes in each direction.

Services are operated using Bombardier CR4000 and Stadler Variobahn model low-floor trams.

Preceding station	Tramlink	Following station
Birkbeck towards Wimbledon	Tramlink; Wimbledon to Beckenham Junction	Beckenham Road towards Beckenham Junction

== Connections ==
The stop is served by London Buses routes 354 which provide connections to Penge via Anerley and Bromley.

== Other transport ==
No car park serves the tram stop, but street parking is available on Blandford Road and Villiers Road. The nearest main roads are the A234 Beckenham Road and A214 Elmers End Road.

A cycle rack is available outside the tram stop with 10 spaces.

== Usage levels ==
Avenue Road tram stop is the least used tram stop on the tram link system. In 2025, Avenue road only received around 62,000 visitors, about 126 per day. The reasons why this stop has so little use is that it is only 600m from Avenue road and there are only residential streets.
