= Penge =

Suburb of south-east London

Coordinates: 51.417°N 0.062°W

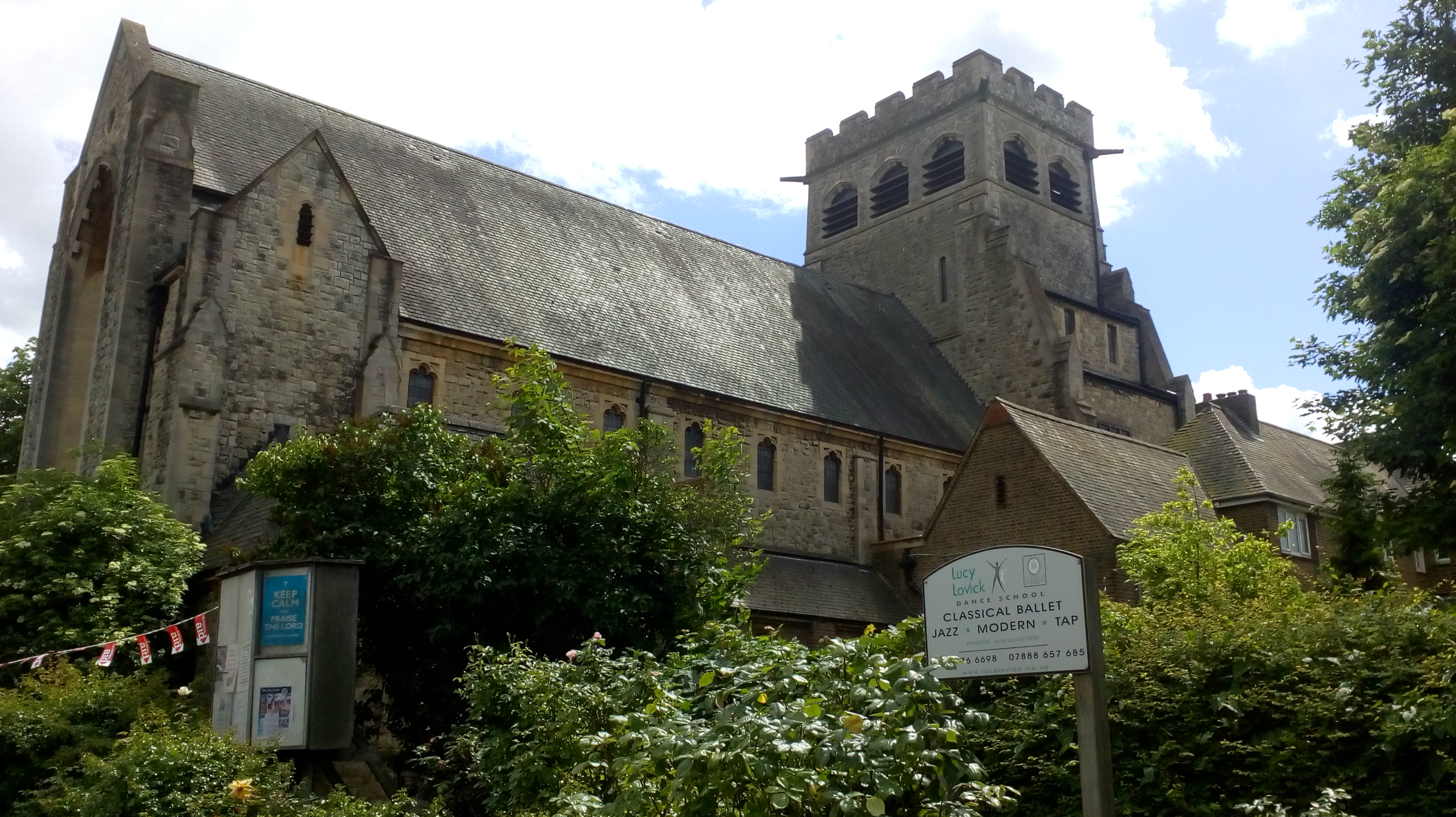
- Congregational Church, Penge

- Location within Greater London
- OS grid reference: TQ345705
  - Charing Cross: 7.1 mi (11.4 km) NNW
- London borough: Bromley
- Ceremonial county: Greater London
- Region: London
- Country: England
- Sovereign state: United Kingdom
- Post town: LONDON
- Postcode district: SE20
- Dialling code: 020
- Police: Metropolitan
- Fire: London
- Ambulance: London
- UK Parliament: Beckenham and Penge
- London Assembly: Bexley and Bromley

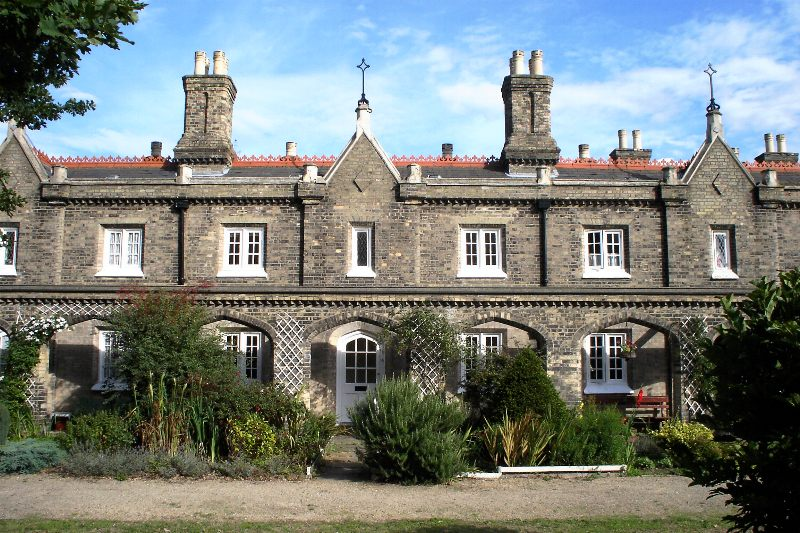
The Watermen's Almshouses

Penge (/pɛndʒ/) is a suburb of South East London, England, now in the London Borough of Bromley, 3.5 miles (5.6 km) west of Bromley: town centre, 3.5 miles (5.6 km) north-east of Croydon and 6.8 miles (10.9 km) south-east of Charing Cross.

== Etymology ==
The name is first attested in a charter of 1067, as Penceat. It derives from the Brittonic words that survive in modern Welsh as pen ("head, end, summit") and coed ("wood"), and thus means "head of the wood", like a number of similar names, including Pencoed and Penketh. A 12th-century copy of a charter of 957 makes mention of se wudu þe hatte Pænge, i.e. "the wood that is called Penge".

The largest amosite mine in the world, in South Africa, was named Penge, apparently because one of the British directors thought the two areas were similar in appearance.

== History ==
Penge was once a small hamlet attached to the manor of Battersea and became independent from the manor in 1888.

=== Pensgreene and the Crooked Billet ===
Penge was an inconspicuous area with few residents before the arrival of the railways. A traveller passing through Penge would have noticed the large common with a small inn on its boundary. Penge Green appears as Pensgreene on Kip's 1607 map. The green was bounded to the north by Penge Lane, the west by Beckenham Road and the southeast by the Crooked Billet. On a modern map that is a very small area, but the modern-day Penge Lane and Crooked Billet are not in their original locations, and Beckenham Road would have been little more than a cart track following the property line on the west side of Penge High Street. Penge Lane was the road from Penge to Sydenham which is now named St John's Road and Newlands Park. There was also an old footpath crossing the Green leading to Sydenham, that was known as Old Penge Lane. After the London, Chatham and Dover Railway was built, Penge Lane crossed the line by level crossing. When this crossing was closed, Penge Lane was renamed and Old Penge Lane became the present-day Penge Lane.

Penge Inclosure Act 1827
- Act of Parliament
- Parliament of the United Kingdom
- Long title: An Act for dividing, allotting, inclosing, and exonerating from Tithes, Lands in the Hamlet of Penge, in the Parish of Battersea in the County of Surrey.
- Citation: 7 & 8 Geo. 4. c. 35 Pr.

Dates
- Royal assent: 14 June 1827

The 1868 Ordnance Survey map shows the Old Crooked Billet located to the southeast of the current location. This earlier location was on the eastward side of Penge Green, which disappeared as a result of the Penge Inclosure Act 1827 (7 & 8 Geo. 4. c. 35 Pr.) which enclosed the whole green. This left the Crooked Billet with no frontage to Beckenham Road; hence, new premises were constructed on the present site in 1827, and subsequently replaced in 1840 with a three-storey building. This was severely damaged by enemy action in the Second World War, and subsequently rebuilt.

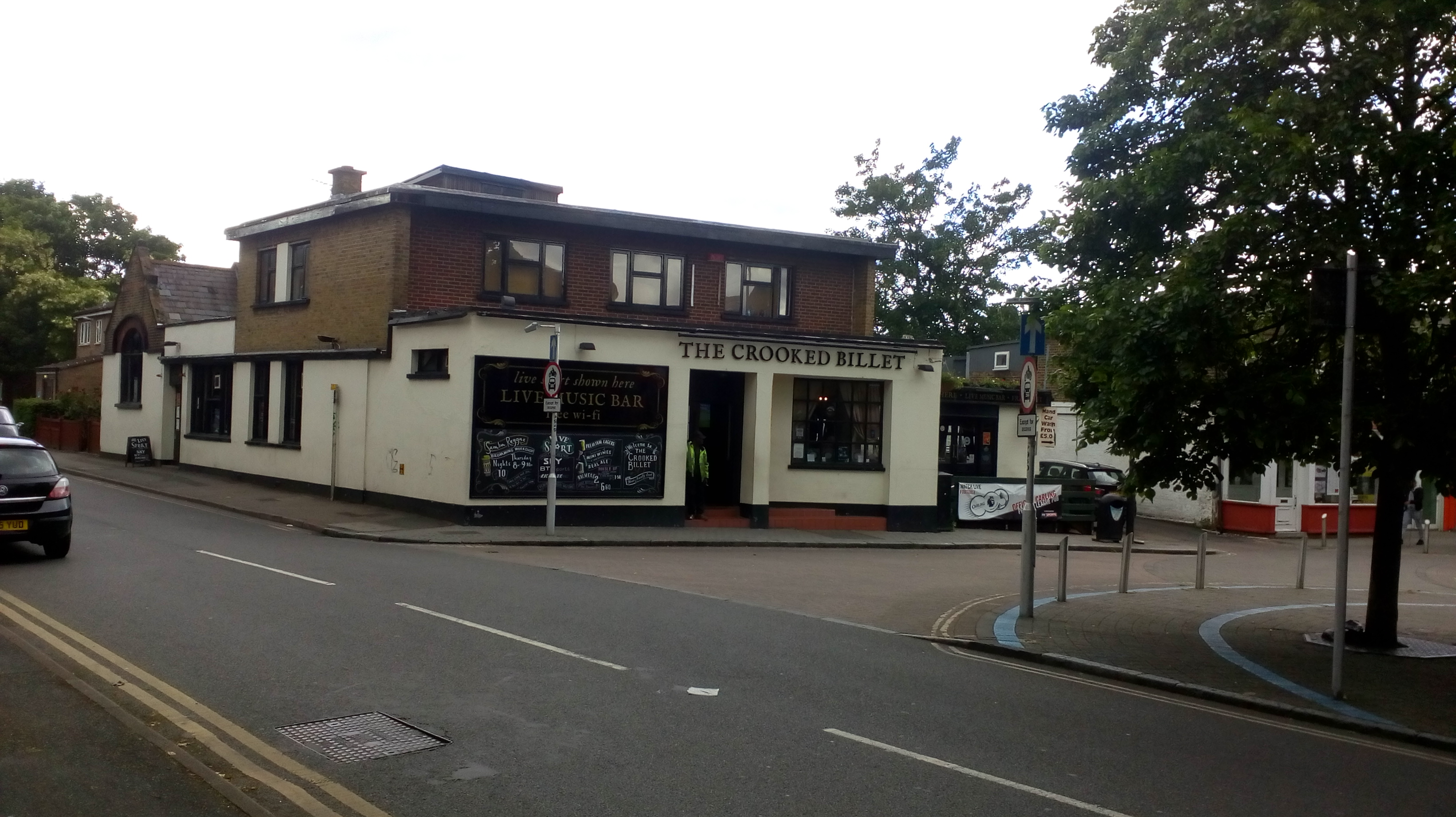
The Crooked Billet pub in Penge

The Crooked Billet (pictured above) is by far the oldest public house in Penge. Peter Abbott states that it was there in 1601, and speculates that it might be much more ancient. In modern times it is particularly well known for lending its name to a bus route terminus. From 1914, General Omnibus routes 109 and 609 operated, along different paths, between Bromley Market and the Crooked Billet. The 109 was renumbered 227 by London Transport, and continued to terminate at the Crooked Billet. (Route 609 was shortened, terminating in Beckenham). Around 1950, some services were extended past the Crooked Billet to Crystal Palace. Eventually nearly all buses travelled the extended route. The 354 buses now use the terminus, as do short-running buses on routes 194 and 358.

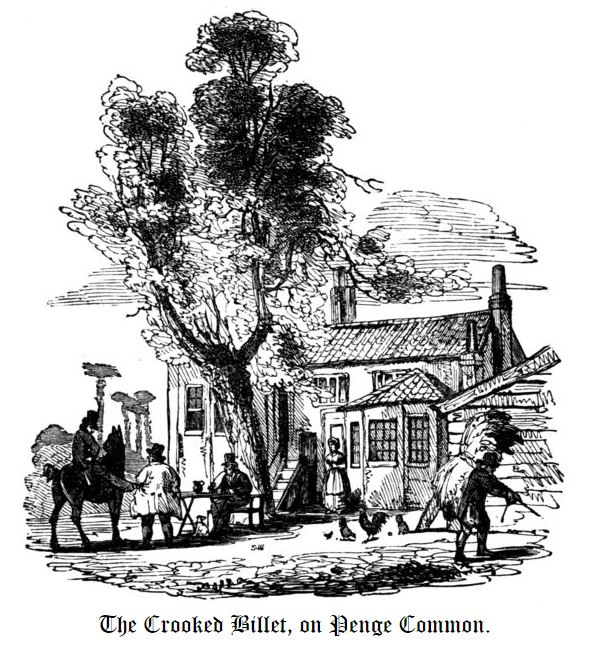
The Crooked Billet, as seen by Hone in 1827

William Hone wrote about a visit to the Crooked Billet in 1827 and included a detailed sketch of the last building on the original site.

=== Expansion ===
The London and Croydon Canal was built across Penge Common along what is now the line of the railway through Penge West railway station, deviating to the south before Anerley railway station. There is a remnant at the northern corner of Betts Park, Anerley. Following the closure of the canal, the London and Croydon Railway was built largely along the same course, opening in 1839. Isambard Kingdom Brunel built an atmospheric railway along this alignment as far as Croydon. The Crystal Palace pneumatic railway, which ran underground between the Sydenham and Penge entrances to Crystal Palace Park, operated for a short while but proved not to be economically viable.

In the Victorian era, Penge developed into a fashionable suburb because of the railway line and its proximity to the relocated Crystal Palace. It became a fashionable day out to visit the Crystal Palace during the day and to take the tram down the hill to one of the 'twenty-five pubs to the square mile' that Penge was reputed to possess, or the two music halls—The King's Hall (later the Gaumont cinema) and, established in 1915, the Empire Theatre (later the Essoldo cinema).

By 1862, Stanford's map of London and its Suburbs shows large homes had been constructed along Penge New Road (now Crystal Palace Park Road, Sydenham and Penge High Street), Thick Wood (now Thicket) Road and Anerley Road. This all came to an end in 1875 and 1877, with the notorious Penge murders. In 1875 Frederick Hunt murdered his wife and children, then in 1877 a wealthy heiress, Harriet Staunton, together with her infant son, was starved to death by her husband and his associates. In 1934, Elizabeth Jenkins published the novel Harriet, based on the case, whilst Forbes Road was renamed to Mosslea Road because of its connection with the murders.

== Governance ==
Penge formed a part of the parish of Battersea, with the historic county boundary between Kent and Surrey forming its eastern boundary. In 1855 both parts of the parish were included in the area of the Metropolitan Board of Works, with Penge Hamlet Vestry electing six members to the Lewisham District Board of Works. The Local Government Act 1888 abolished the Metropolitan Board, with its area becoming the County of London. However, the London Government Act 1899 subsequently made provision for Penge to be removed from the County of London and annexed to either Surrey or Kent. Accordingly, an Order in Council transferred the hamlet to Kent in 1900, constituting it as Penge Urban District. The urban district was abolished in 1965 by the London Government Act 1963, and its former area merged with that of other districts to form the London Borough of Bromley. With the creation of the Penge Urban District, Penge New Road (formerly the part of Beckenham Road north of Kent House Road) was renamed Penge High Street.

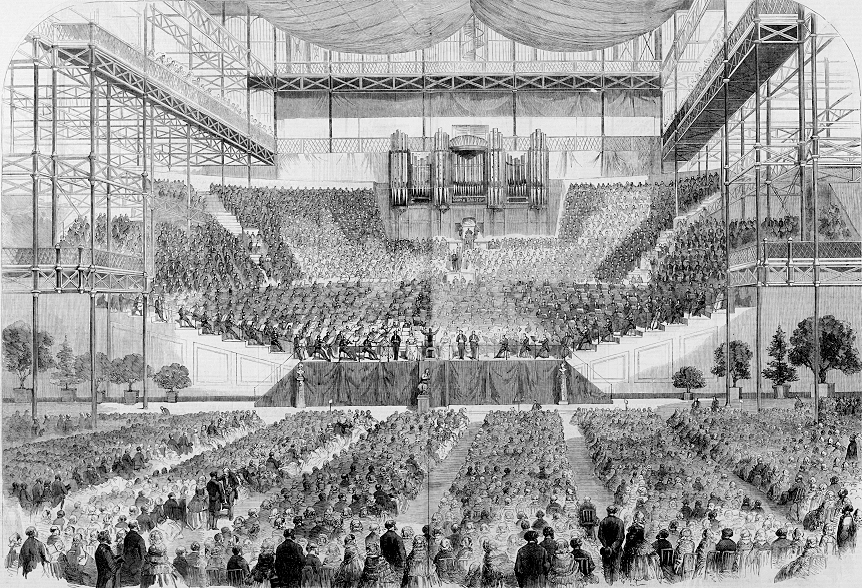
Inside the Crystal Palace concert hall 1857

The urban district comprised three sub-districts: Anerley, Penge and Upper Norwood. It incorporated the whole of Crystal Palace Park except for part of the eastern side running along Crystal Palace Park Road which was then administered by Beckenham Urban District. From 1885, the Hamlet of Penge was part of the Dulwich parliamentary constituency, which was then in Surrey, and remained in that seat until 1918, when it was transferred to the new Bromley constituency. From 1950, it was part of the Beckenham constituency. At the 2010 general election, Penge formed part of the Lewisham West and Penge constituency. In 2024 it again changed to become part of the new Beckenham and Penge constituency. In local government, Penge is contained in the Penge and Cator ward, which had a population of 17,326 in 2011.

== Geography ==
=== Nearby areas ===
- Crystal Palace
- Sydenham
- Anerley
- Beckenham
- Upper Norwood
- South Norwood
- Dulwich
- Catford

== Culture and community ==
- Penge is home to a number of taverns and public houses; indeed it was noted in Victorian times for its '25 pubs to the square mile'. The Crooked Billet is by far the oldest.
- The Pawleyne Arms is currently the terminus for the 176 bus service. It was previously an intermediate turning point for short-running buses on the 12, 75 and 194 bus services, becoming the southern terminus for route 12 between 1986 and 1988, when the route was again shortened.
- The public houses in Maple Road have nearly all changed their names. The Dew Drop Inn was known as The Market Tavern (and featured in the television series The Bill as the Market Tavern in Canley Market) before its closure. The London Tavern became The Hop Exchange and then The Hop House. It was closed by 2006, and in 2009 it was undergoing conversion into residential accommodation. The Lord Palmerston has been delicensed and is now a pizza outlet. The King William IV became The Crown and is now The Maple Tree. Only The Golden Lion (now closed) retained its name, although it extended its premises substantially; it was listed in every edition of the Good Beer Guide from 1976 to 1987.

Closed pubs include The Golden Lion, Kent House Tavern, Robin Hood (closed, subsequently destroyed by fire in 2006 and demolished), Royal Oak (closed 2011), Queen Adelaide Arms (closed 2010), The Mitre (closed 2018), The Goat House (destroyed by fire and now demolished), The Waterman's Arms (now Superdrug), The Anchor (closed circa 1910), The General Simpson, The General Jackson, The Retreat, The Cornish Arms, The Railway Bell, The Thicket Tavern, The Paxton and Hollywood East (closed 2017) (formerly The Park Tavern). The last-named was the venue for the 1877 inquest into the murder of Harriet Staunton.

- Penge also has several clubs, including a Conservative Club, The Penge & District Trade Union & Labour Social Club (CIU), built by local tradesmen in 1922, and the former Liberal Club, which closed in 2005.
- Penge has a contemporary fine art gallery called Tension, which opened in April 2019 at 135 Maple Road.
- Brewery and taproom Southey Brewing Co takes its name from the street it resides, Southey Street. The street in turn, takes its name from poet Robert Southey, one of many roads nearby named after poets including Wordsworth Road and Tennyson Road, though none ever resided locally.

=== Community facilities ===
Fragments of the original Penge Common still survive in Betts Park. Winsford Gardens formed part of the grounds of Chesham Park and later Winsford House.

== Landmarks ==
- There are several Victorian almshouses in Penge, the oldest being the Free Watermen and Lightermen's Almshouses (also known as the Royal Watermen's Almshouses), built in 1840–1841 on Beckenham Road, to designs by George Porter by the Company of Watermen and Lightermen of the City of London, for retired company freemen and their widows. The residents were moved in 1973 to a new site in Hastings and the original buildings were converted into private homes.
- The Queen Adelaide Almshouses, also known as the King William Naval Asylum, St. John's Road, founded in 1847 and built in 1848 to designs by Philip Hardwick at the request and expense of Queen Adelaide of Saxe-Meiningen, the widow of King William IV, to provide shelter for twelve widows or orphan daughters of naval officers. Again, the almshouses are now private residences.
- St. John's Cottages on Maple Road were built as almshouses in 1863, designed by the architect Edwin Nash. As with their predecessors, the cottages are now privately owned homes. On New Year's Day 1959, No.8 was destroyed by a gas explosion, killing one person. The cottage was rebuilt to closely resemble the original.
- The police station at the corner of the High Street and Green Lane is believed to have been London's oldest working police station when it was closed in 2010.
- When completed in 1956 the Crystal Palace Transmitter was the tallest structure in the UK, a record it lost to the Anglia Television transmitter at Belmont, Lincolnshire in 1959. It remained the tallest structure in the London area until 1991.

=== Gallery ===
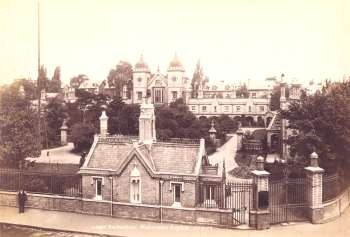
Waterman's Square Almhouses in 1890

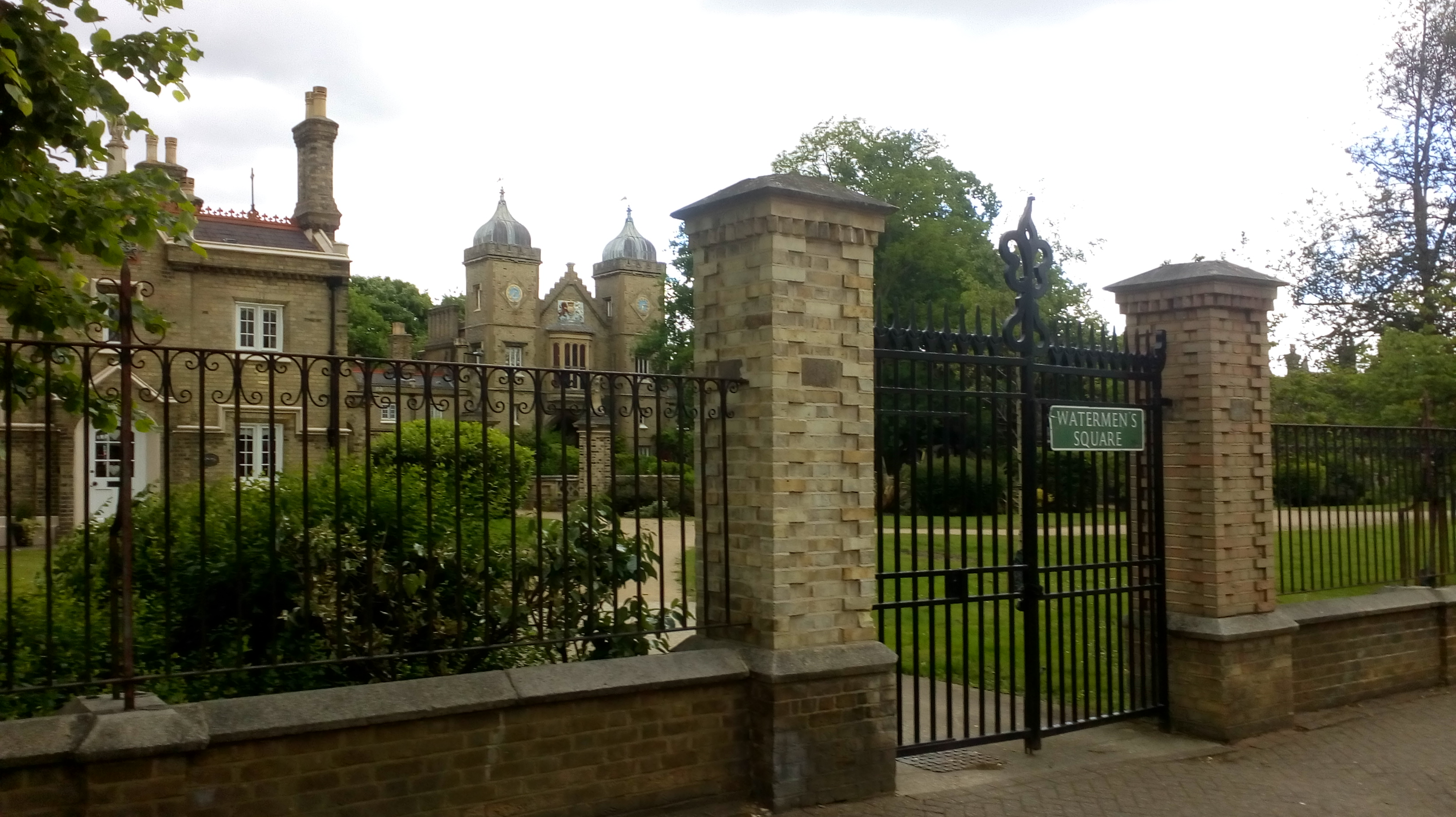
Waterman's Square Almshouses in 2017

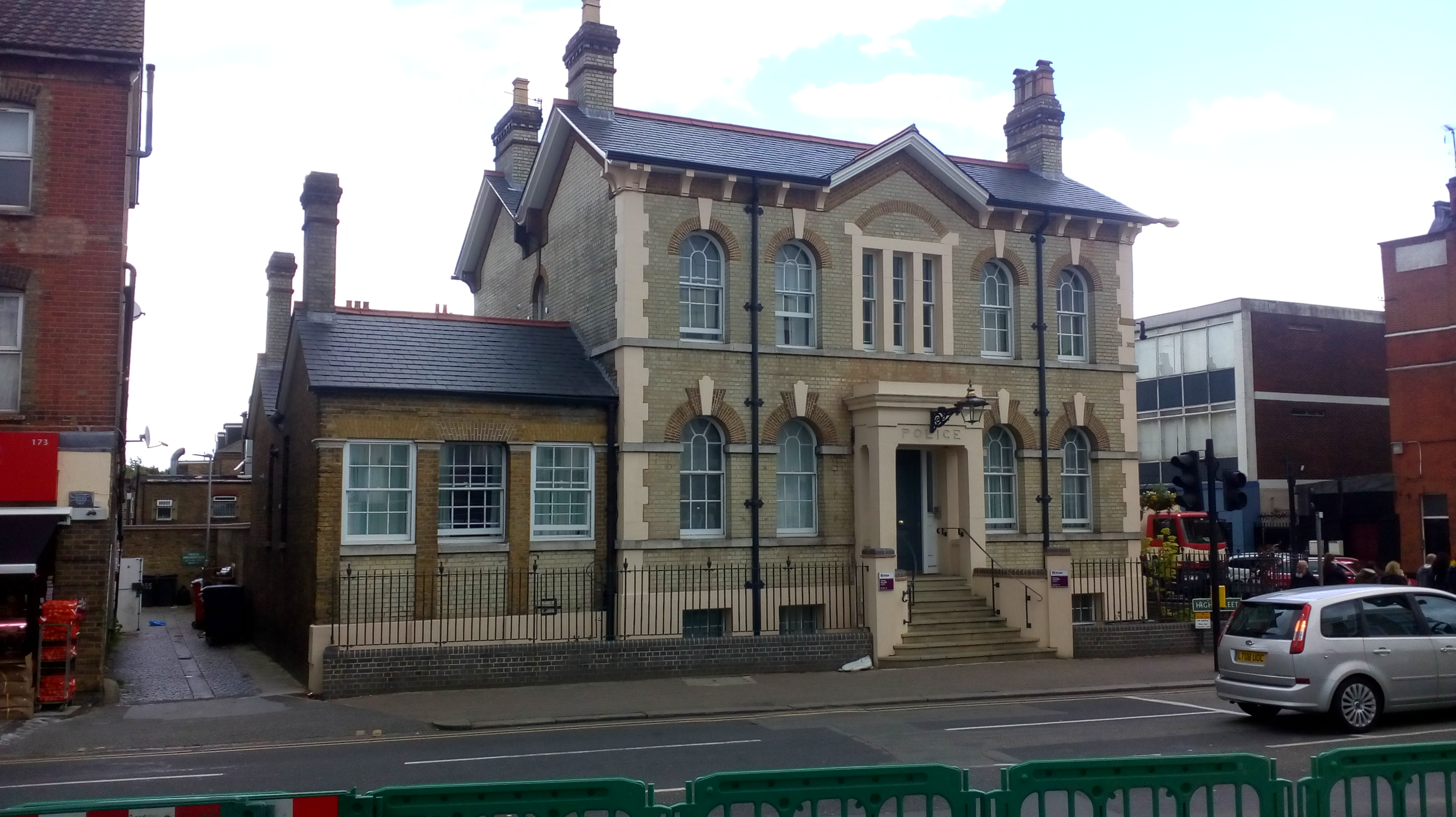
Former Police Station in Penge

== Transport ==
=== Rail ===
Penge West station is served by London Overground's Windrush line services to Dalston Junction, Highbury & Islington and West Croydon. The former National Rail services to London Bridge, East Croydon and points south have been discontinued post COVID-19, although there is a campaign to have them reinstated.

Penge East and Kent House also serve the area with National Rail services to London Victoria, Bromley South and Orpington. Services may occasionally be extended beyond Orpington to Sevenoaks.

=== Buses ===
Penge is served by London Buses routes 75, 176, 194, 197, 227, 354, 356, 358 and N3. These connect it with areas including Beckenham, Bromley, Camberwell, Catford, Central London, Croydon, Crystal Palace, Dulwich, Elephant & Castle, Elmers End, Farnborough, Forest Hill, Lewisham, Orpington, Peckham, Shirley, South Norwood, Sydenham and West Wickham.

=== Road ===
Three A roads, the A213, A214 and A234 pass through the area. The A213 intersects with the A234 at the Pawleyne Arms and the A214 at the Robin Hood.

=== Trams ===
Avenue Road is located on the southern tip of Penge and provides transport links to Wimbledon, Beckenham and Croydon.

== Education ==
St Johns C.E. Primary School was originally part of the Old Penge Chapel, which opened in 1837. Early in the 1850s, following the completion of St John the Evangelist, the school took over the entire old chapel building. The school's site was extended in 1977, and a new school building was opened in September 1978.

The Beckenham and Penge County Grammar School for boys, formerly the Beckenham Technical Institute which opened in 1901, moved to a new site on Penge High Street between Kent House Road and Kingsdale Road in 1931. It moved from Penge to its present location in Eden Park, Beckenham, in January 1969.

== Religious sites ==
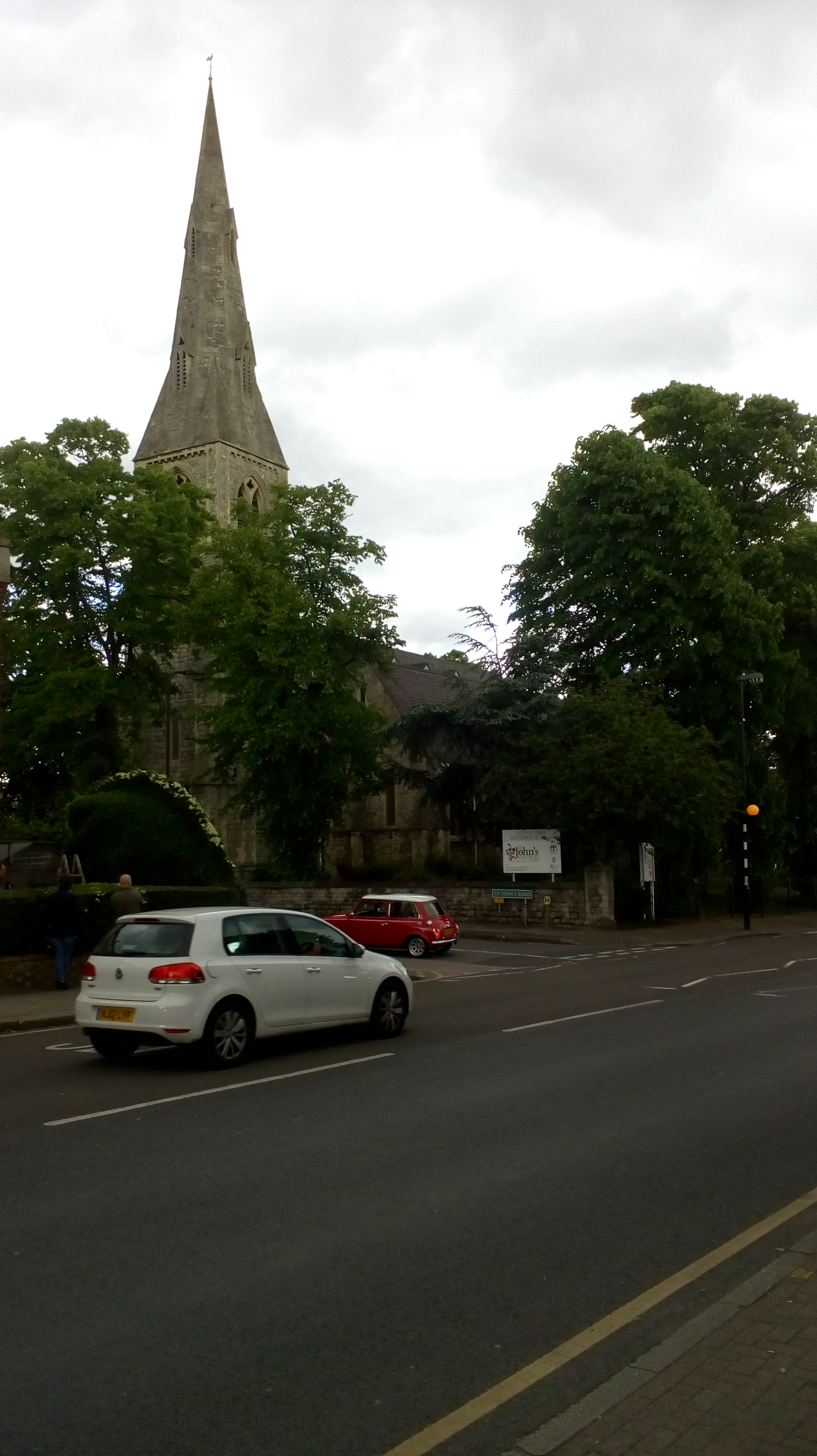
St John's Church, the parish church of Penge

St John the Evangelist's Church, Penge (pictured right) in Beckenham Road, was built in 1850 to designs by Edwin Nash & J. N. Round. Penge Congregational Church was built in 1912 to designs by P. Morley Horder with passage aisles and clerestory, shafts on large, excellently carved corbels, and a stained glass window by William Morris.

== Sport ==
Crystal Palace Park contains the National Sports Centre, which includes an international-class athletic stadium, and a former motorsport circuit that was used in the 1969 film The Italian Job. The Crystal Palace Park once housed a football ground, which hosted the FA Cup final from 1895 to 1914, as well as London County Cricket Club games from 1900 to 1908, when the club folded, and Crystal Palace FC's matches from their formation in 1905 until the club was forced to relocate during the First World War. Other facilities include Alexandra Recreation Ground, Penge Recreation Ground and Royston Playing Fields.

== Cultural references ==
After the Crystal Palace was moved to Penge Place, a fashionable day out was to visit the Crystal Palace during the day and to take the tram down the hill to one of the 'twenty-five pubs to the square mile' or two Music Halls.

- Horace Rumpole, a barrister known as "Rumpole of the Bailey", frequently tells others of his greatest triumph, winning an acquittal in the Penge Bungalow Murders "alone and without a leader." Author John Mortimer's original chronology was incorrect, as the Penge bungalows were prefabricated houses which replaced homes destroyed during the Second World War, long after the date of Rumpole's claimed triumph. When the details of the trial were later documented by Mortimer in the novel Rumpole and the Penge Bungalow Murders in 2002, he moved the events to the early 1950s.
- The 's Up episode of Bottom has a plot point that their landlord has to be in Penge very soon, forcing him to leave his shop under their supervision.
- Richard 'Dick' Remmington, the narrator of the novel The New Machiavelli by H. G. Wells, is born in 'Bromstead' (Bromley) but significant episodes of his early life occur in Penge.
- The band Public Image Ltd have a song called "Penge" on their End of the World album.
- The David Bowie song 'Did You Ever Have a Dream? (1967) contains the lyric 'You can walk around in New York while you sleep in Penge'.

== Notable residents ==
- Thomas Crapper (1836–1910), the famous Victorian manufacturing plumber, retired to live at 12 Thornsett Road (c. 1897–1910). He is commonly, but erroneously, credited with inventing the flush toilet. He did however develop the U-bend, a significant improvement on the S-bend, which the BBC has nominated as one of the 50 Things That (have) Made the Modern Economy.
- Barbara Strang (1925–1982), an English language scholar was born here in 1925.
- Joseph Petrus Hendrik Crowe (1826–1876), Victoria Cross recipient, died at Penge in 1876.
- Walter de la Mare (1873–1956), famous poet and author of ghost stories, resided at 195 Mackenzie Road, Beckenham (1899–1908) then moved to 5 Worbeck Road (1908–1912) and 14 Thornsett Road (1912–1925).
- John Freeman (1880–1929), Georgian poet and essayist. He was a friend of Walter de la Mare.
- Camille Pissarro (1830–1903), French impressionist painter, lived in Penge in the 1870s.
- H. T. Muggeridge (1864–1942), British politician, father of Malcolm Muggeridge
- Malcolm Muggeridge (1903–1990), British journalist, author, satirist, media personality, soldier-spy and latterly Christian apologist.
- Andrew Bonar Law (1858–1923), prime minister, who was the member of parliament for Dulwich and lived in Oakfield Road in Penge.
- John Clunies-Ross (1786–1854), first King of the Cocos Islands
- Tom Hood (1835–1874), author, playwright and editor of Fun magazine lived at 12 Queen Adelaide Road.
- Helena Normanton (1882–1957), was the first woman to practise as a barrister in the UK.
- Bert Strudwick (1880–1970), Surrey and England wicket-keeper, lived at 4 Worbeck Road.
- Bill Wyman (born 1936), bassist with The Rolling Stones, lived in Penge as a child.
- Peggy Spencer MBE (1920–2016), choreographer and regular contributor to the BBC TV show Come Dancing in the 1960s and 1970s, and lived at 12 Percy Road.
- George Daniels, CBE (1926–2010), watchmaker and inventor of the Coaxial escapement as used by Omega watches, lived in Thornsett Road and is commemorated by a blue plaque.
- Monica Furlong (1930–2003), celebrated religious affairs correspondent, journalist and novelist lived in Station Road and once edited Spire, the magazine of Holy Trinity Church, Lennard Road.
- Dadabhai Naoroji, prominent Indian independence campaigner, author and MP for Finsbury Central 1892–1895 lived at 72 Anerley Park from August 1897–1904/5.
- Rutland Barrington (1853–1922) was a renowned musical comedy actor and gained fame as a star of Gilbert and Sullivan productions. He was also a prominent forward for the first Crystal Palace FC and resided at Headley Lodge, Croydon Road.
- Margaret Elwyn Sparshott (1870–1940) was a World War I matron, in charge of 22 hospitals in the Manchester area. She retired to Penge, and lived there between 1929 and 1940.
- Matthew Smith (born 1966), developer of Manic Miner and Jet Set Willy for the ZX Spectrum
- Ted Dillon (1881–1941) captained Kent CCC to three County Championship victories and played rugby union for England and Blackheath F.C.
