= Betts Park =

Public park in Penge, London Borough of Bromley, in London, England

Coordinates: 51.4089°N 0.0647°W

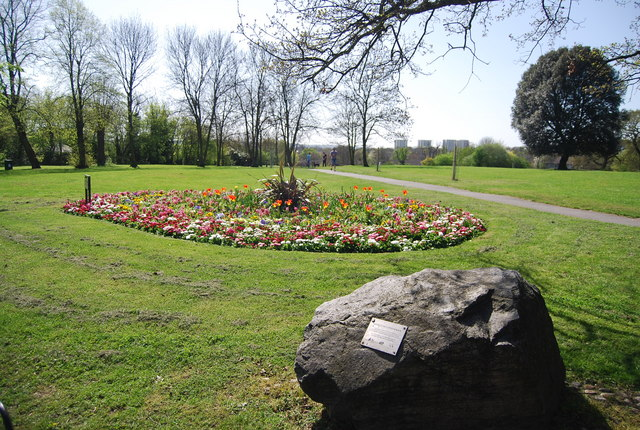
Betts Park

Betts Park (also known as King George's Field) is a public park in Anerley, London Borough of Bromley, in southeast London, England. It is approximately 13 acres (5 hectares) and has a number of attractions, including part of the old Croydon Canal and the Heart of Anerley obelisk. The current park was opened in December 1928 and extended throughout the 1930s, with the final addition of "new fields" by the King George V Memorial Trust in 1937. The boundaries of the park mirror the outline of an ancient copse dating back over 1000 years.

== Location ==
Betts Park is in the Anerley area of Penge and is publicly owned. The park's main entrances are from Anerley Road. There are other entrances from Weighton Road, Seymour Villas, Croydon Road, and Betts Way.

== History ==
The land where Betts Park now stands originally contained a semi-enclosed coppice on Penge Common known as Clay Copse. In 957 the entire common was given by King Eadwig to thane Lyfing, for services rendered, and became an exclave of the Manor and Parish of Battersea. In 1066 the Manor of Battersea was confiscated by King William I and handed to Westminster Abbey. After the dissolution of the monasteries it was sold first to the Oliver St John family. It was later acquired by the Earl Spencer. In 1806 the Croydon Canal was built, the last remnant of which still forms the northwest boundary of Betts Park. In 1827 the entire common was inclosed and auctioned with lots sold for development. Residential houses and a church were erected encircling the coppice with the woodland divided into gardens, with the exception of a small area in the southeast corner believed to have contained the waggon home of Betty Saville, the last tenant of Penge Common, and an area in the southwest where tennis courts were built.

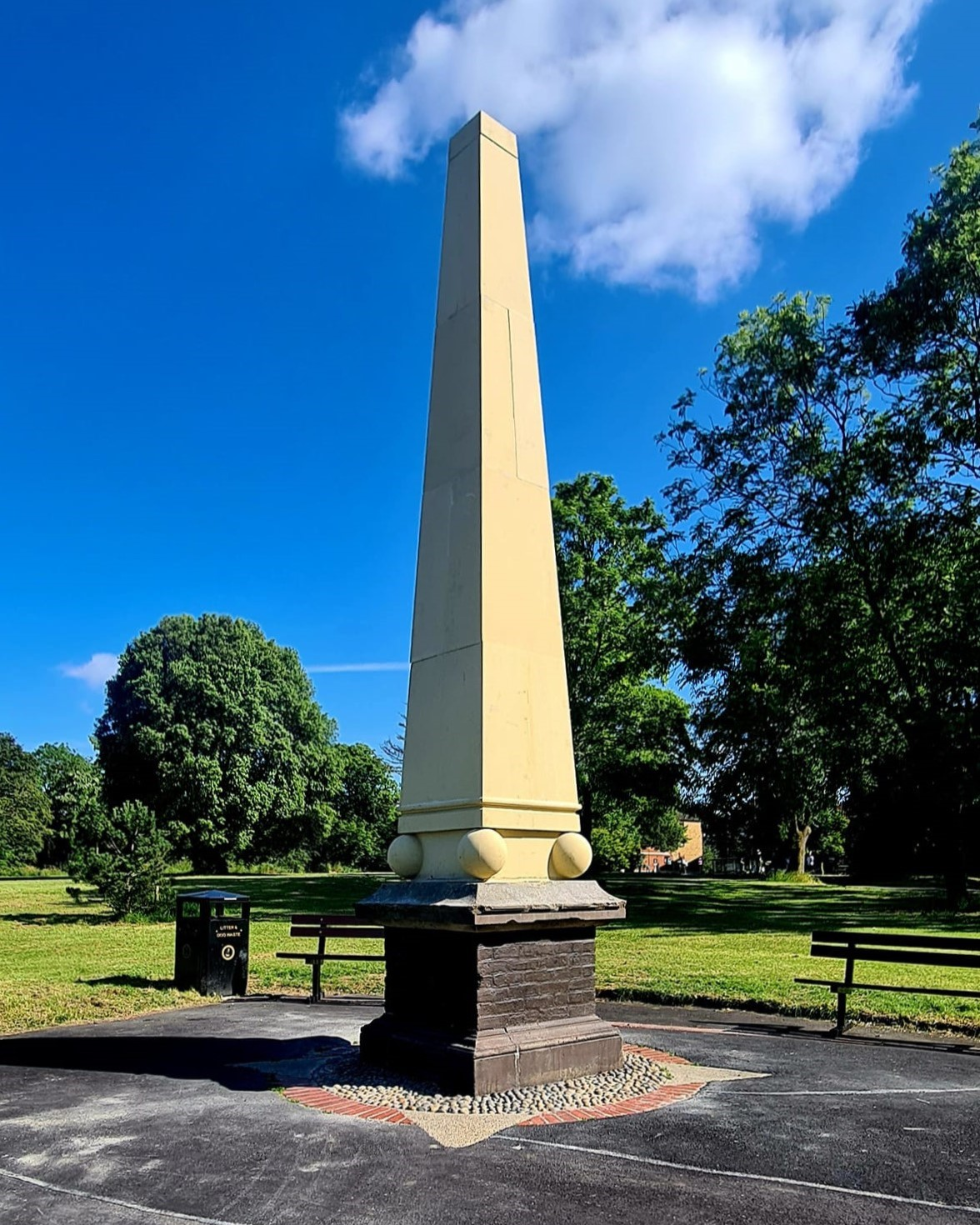
Heart of Anerley Monument 2024

The public park was initially created from a house and land on the north side of the park donated by Mr. Frederick Betts, a local property owner. The house, a Victorian villa known as Oak Lawn, became a public library and the gardens became recreation grounds. Betts Park was opened in December 1928 and named in memory of Frederick's late mother, Sarah Betts. Within a few years, Penge Urban District Council purchased additional land and the remains of the Croydon Canal. In June 1936 the park was further increased in size with the addition of land to the southeastern side by the King George's Fields Foundation memorial trust as one of their bequests in England, and later incorporated into the National Playing Fields Association. The park is now legally protected from development by Deeds of Dedication from Fields in Trust.

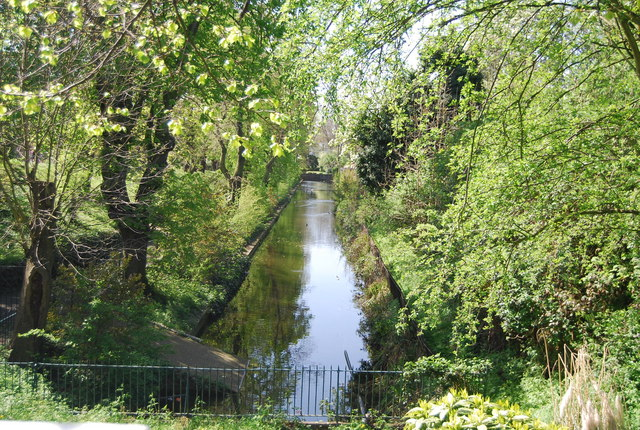
The last trace of the Croydon Canal

Betts Park contains one of the last remnants of the short-lived Croydon Canal, a Millennium Rock (a boulder of Lewisian Gneiss gifted by the people of Lochinver in Scotland), a veteran holm oak believed to be a survivor of Penge Common and the 6m Heart of Anerley obelisk erected in 2024 as a monument to all the people whose names are never written on monuments.

In the extreme heatwave of July 2022, the grass to the north of the park discoloured to reveal a ghost image of Oak Lawn villa, which had been demolished in the late 1960s.

In May 2025 the demolition of The Mitre public house, adjacent to the historic entrance from Croydon Road (locally known at Mitre Gate), went awry closing access for months and potentially damaging the King George V memorial plaques.

=== Murders ===
On 2 November 2017, Michael Jonas, a 17-year-old boy, was stabbed and killed in the park. In October 2022, six people were charged with his murder. All were found guilty at trial in October 2023.

On 12 July 2020, Dean Edwards was shot and killed at the Croydon Road entrance to the park, in an apparent case of mistaken identity. A man was charged with murder the following month, but was found not guilty in May 2022.

== Facilities ==
Facilities in the park include a football pitch, an outdoor gym, basketball court, goal posts, skateboard area and children's play area. There is also a pre-school daycare centre for children in the former tennis pavilion building.

== Friends ==
London Borough of Bromley offers a scheme for locals to become a part of a friend group for the many parks. These groups are made up of volunteers who want to help discuss how the local parks are maintained, used, and developed. Friends of Betts Park is part of this scheme.
