= Penge Urban District =

Former local government area in the UK

Coordinates: 51°25′N 0°4′W

Penge
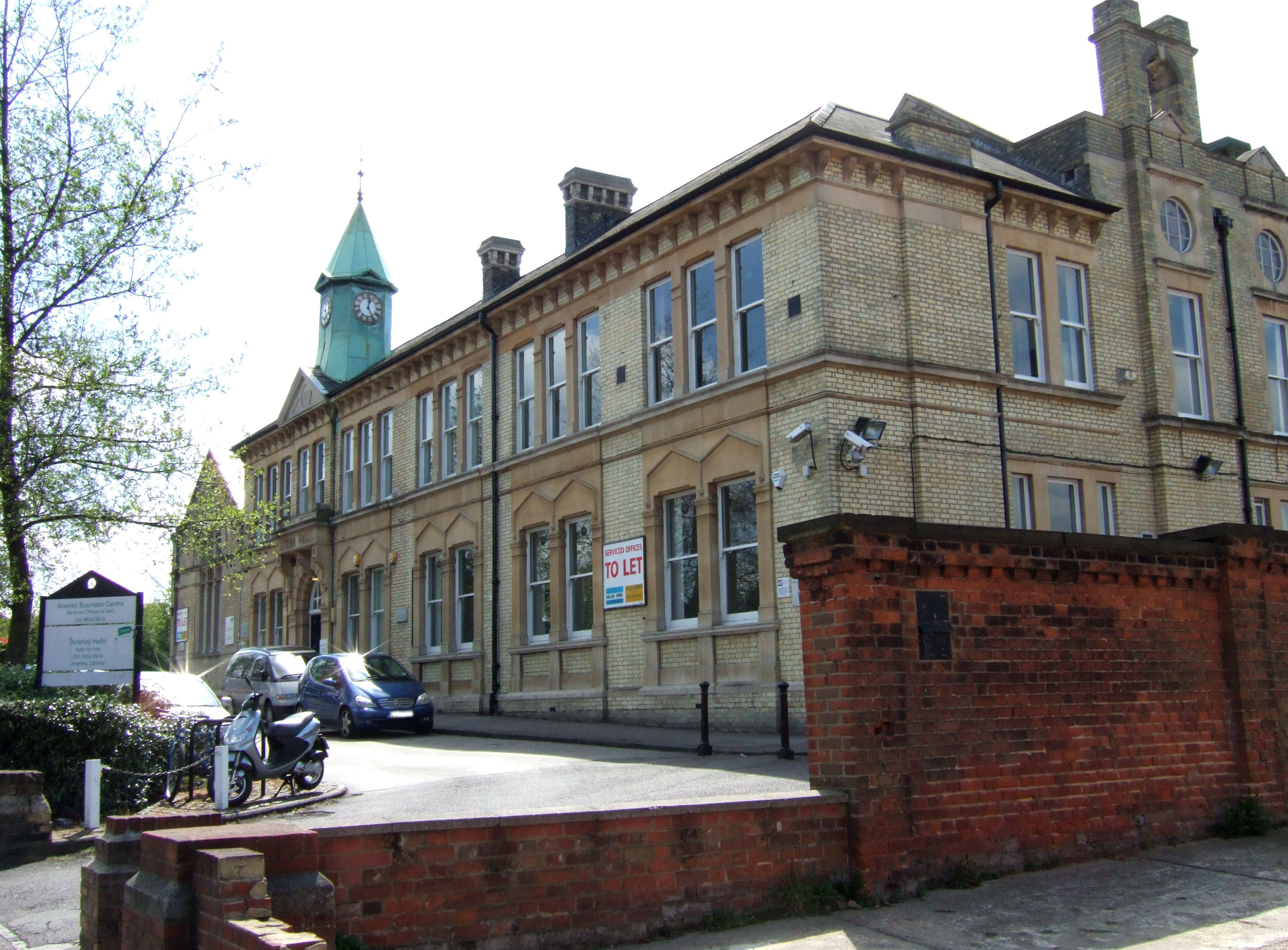
- Penge Vestry Hall was built in 1878
- Area
  - 1911: 770 acres (3.1 km^{2})
  - 1961: 769 acres (3.1 km^{2})
- Population
  - 1911: 22,330
  - 1961: 25,743
- Density
  - 1911: 29/acre
  - 1961: 33/acre
- History
  - Origin: Detached hamlet of Battersea
  - Created: 1866
  - Abolished: 1965
  - Succeeded by: London Borough of Bromley
- Status: Civil parish (1866–1965); Urban district (1900–1965)
- Government: Penge Urban District Council (1900–1965)
  - HQ: Town Hall, Anerley Road
- Contained within
  - County: Surrey (1866–1889); London (1889–1900); Kent (1900–1965)

Penge was a civil parish and a local government district located to the southeast of London, England. It included the settlements of Penge, Anerley and part of Crystal Palace. It was part of the London postal district, Metropolitan Police District and, from 1933, the London Passenger Transport Area. In 1965 the urban district was abolished by the London Government Act 1963 and it became part of Greater London, being combined with other districts to form the London Borough of Bromley.

== Background ==
Penge was a detached hamlet of the ancient parish of Battersea in the Brixton hundred of Surrey.

== Parish in the Metropolis ==
Battersea became part of the area administered by the Metropolitan Board of Works in 1855 and the main part of the parish was grouped into the Wandsworth District, whilst Penge became part of the Lewisham District. It formed part of the London School Board area established in 1870. Penge became part of the Croydon Poor Law Union under the New Poor Law, thus it was part of Surrey for poor law and registration purposes and did not form part of the Metropolitan Asylums District established in 1867.

Penge remained formally part of the parish of Battersea, however it was established in 1859 that the two parts of the parish held separate funds and Penge had distinct local government arrangements. In 1866 it became a separate civil parish in its own right. In 1876 an application was made to the Local Government Board that the Vestries Act 1850 should apply to the parish. This allowed Penge Vestry Hall to be constructed.

== Removal from the Metropolis ==
Penge formed part of the County of London from 1889. In 1900 the local government arrangements in the County of London were reformed by the London Government Act 1899. Provision was made for Penge to be combined with either the Metropolitan Borough of Camberwell or the Metropolitan Borough of Lewisham in the County of London, to be combined with the County Borough of Croydon, or to form an urban district in the counties of Surrey or Kent.

A local enquiry took place on 26/27 October 1899 at the Penge Vestry Hall. The London County Council thought Penge should remain in the County of London, as did the Crystal Palace Company, whose property was split between districts but mostly in the County of London. Surrey County Council did not want Penge brought into their area, because if it became an urban district in Surrey the County Borough of Croydon would cut it off as an exclave of the administrative county which would have made administration difficult. Kent County Council approved of taking Penge into their area. The Penge Vestry favoured transfer to Surrey, ranking transfer to Kent or amalgamation with Croydon as the next preferred options. Amalgamation with Camberwell was the least preferred option. Issues raised during the enquiry included the rates, earlier pub closing hours outside London, the desire to remain in the Croydon poor law union and the potential for Penge to be a self-governing unit. In the event it was transferred to Kent as an urban district.

== Parliamentary representation ==
Penge was part of the Dulwich Division of Camberwell from 1885 for election of members of parliament. Penge was part of the Dulwich constituency for elections to the London County Council in 1889, 1892, 1895 and 1898.

== Abolition ==
In 1965 the urban district was abolished by the London Government Act 1963 and its former area was transferred to Greater London, to be combined with that of other districts to form the present-day London Borough of Bromley. The town hall remains in use as the offices of Bromley Social Services and Housing.
