= Penge Common =

Former area, now part of London, England

Coordinates: 51°24′51″N 0°3′51″W

Penge Common was an area of north east Surrey and north west Kent which now forms part of London, England; covering most of Penge, all of Anerley, and parts of surrounding suburbs including South Norwood. It abutted the Great North Wood and John Rocque's 1745 map of London and its environs showed that Penge Common now included part of that wood.

An area named Penge Place was excised from the northernmost part of Penge Common and was later used for the relocation of The Crystal Palace. It included parts of the Great North Wood which later became Crystal Palace Park.

The London and Croydon Canal was built across Penge Common along what is now the line of the railway through Penge West railway station, deviating to the south before Anerley railway station. There is a remnant at the northern corner of Betts Park, Anerley. Following the closure of the London and Croydon Canal, The London and Croydon Railway, initially an atmospheric railway was built largely along the same course, opening in 1839.

The Croydon Inclosure Act 1797 (37 Geo. 3. c. 144 Pr.), the Dulwich Inclosure Act 1805 (45 Geo. 3. c. 102 Pr.), an act of 1806, and the Penge Inclosure Act 1827 (7 & 8 Geo. 4. c. 35 Pr.) resulted in most of the remaining Common and Penge Green being subdivided. One of the first new houses was named "Annerley" which gave its name to the Anerley area; the name means 'lonely' or 'only' in Scots.

Remnants of Penge Common that survive as public open spaces include Crystal Palace Park, Penge Recreation Ground and Betts Park in Anerley.
