= Anerley =

Coordinates: 51.4147°N 0.067°W

- Suburb
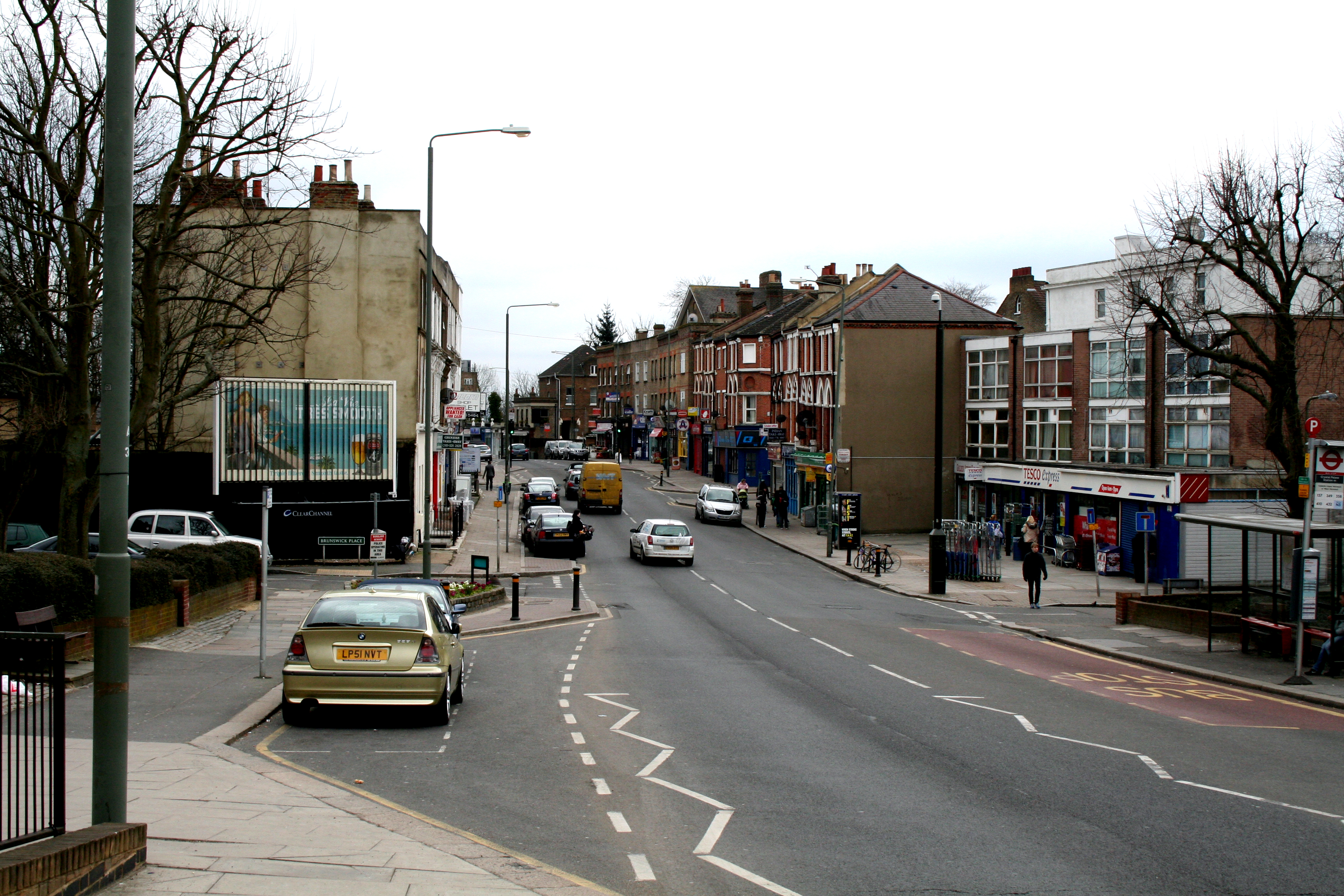
- Anerley Road 2010

- Location within Greater London
- OS grid reference: TQ345695
  - Charing Cross: 7.0 mi (11.3 km) NNW
- London borough: Bromley
- Ceremonial county: Greater London
- Region: London
- Country: England
- Sovereign state: United Kingdom
- Post town: LONDON
- Postcode district: SE20
- Dialling code: 020
- Police: Metropolitan
- Fire: London
- Ambulance: London
- UK Parliament: Beckenham and Penge
- London Assembly: Bexley and Bromley

Anerley (/ˈænərli/) is suburb of south east London, England, within the London Borough of Bromley. It is located 7 miles (11 km) south south-east of Charing Cross, to the south of Upper Norwood, west of Penge, north of Elmers End and east of South Norwood. The northern edge of Anerley contains part of the area commonly known as Crystal Palace, and the site of the ancient Vicar's Oak where the London boroughs of Bromley, Croydon, Lambeth and Southwark meet, with Lewisham 800 yards (740m) away.

== History ==
=== Origin and development ===
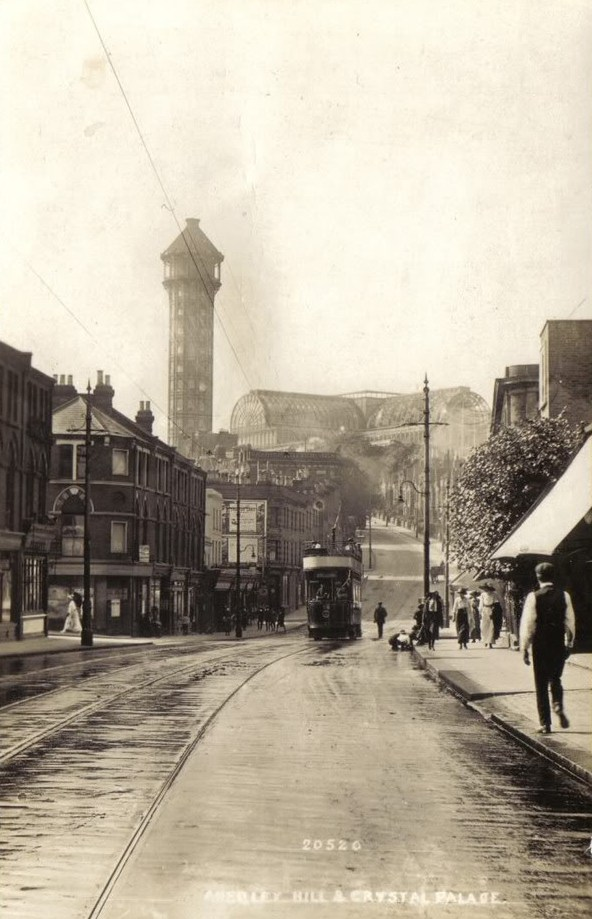
Anerley Hill road with the Crystal Palace

Anerley began as a "new town" within the ancient hamlet of Penge. Prior to enclosure in 1827, what would later become known as Anerley, was an unoccupied part of Penge Common, that did not fully develop until the 1850s following the relocation of the Crystal Palace to Penge Place at the top of Sydenham Hill.

The Penge Inclosure Act 1827 (7 & 8 Geo. 4. c. 35 Pr.) to divide and inclose a parcel of waste land called Penge Common stipulated that a 50 feet (15 metres) wide, new road, was to be set out from Clay Lane (now Elmers End Road) to Church Road, Upper Norwood. In October 1827, a Scottish silk and wine merchant originally from Galashiels named William Sanderson bought land at the auction of the former Penge Common and built the first house in the area, which he named "Anerly" (later Anerley Lodge), a Scots word meaning "solitary" or "only", and the road subsequently became known as Anerley Road, also giving the name to the surrounding area. Sanderson's name is the first to appear in the first rate book, dated 18 June 1827, now held in the London Borough of Bromley archives.

=== Canal and railway ===
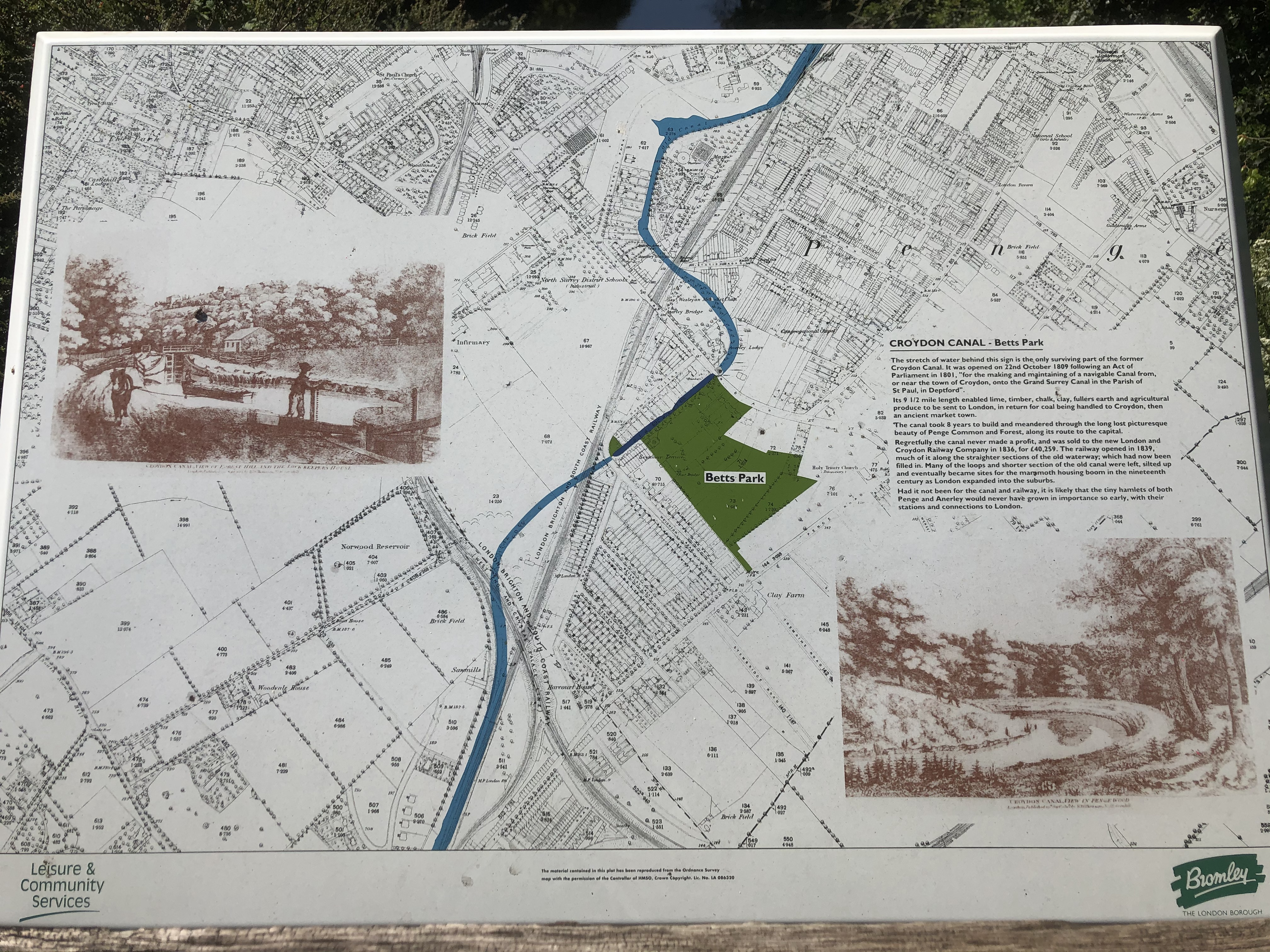
Croydon Canal information board in Betts Park, Anerley

The Croydon Canal was opened on 22 October 1809, and passed through Anerley. The canal was a financial failure and lasted only 27 years, being sold to the London and Croydon Railway Company for £40,250. The London and Croydon Railway used most of the former canal for the new railway line, but two remnants are still visible in Betts Park, Anerley and Dacres Wood, Sydenham. The railway deviated from the canal course entering a new cutting near what is now Anerley railway station (opened on 5 June 1839 and named initially as Annerley Bridge Station). William Sanderson made land available in return for the creation of the railway station adjacent to his house "Anerly". Isambard Kingdom Brunel built an atmospheric railway along this course in 1845, but it was short-lived. The inability to include points on an atmospheric railway resulted in the construction of flyovers one of which runs through Anerley between Crystal Palace railway station and Sydenham railway station. A train collision occurred at Anerley on 5 October 1844 - 24 people were injured, although no fatalities occurred. The driver was found to be at fault, along with a lack of tail lights. The report stated the following: "The second train passed the Jolly Sailor Station (now Norwood Junction) about three minutes after the first, the green light being then exhibited there as a signal to go on with caution; and on approaching the Anerley Station, the engineman of this train observed a red light on the signal post, which was the signal to stop at that station; but not seeing the red light that ought to have been exhibited in the rear of the preceding train, he considered it was gone. and just as it was slowly quitting the station he ran into it, but with diminished speed"

=== Anerley Gardens & Anerley Arms ===
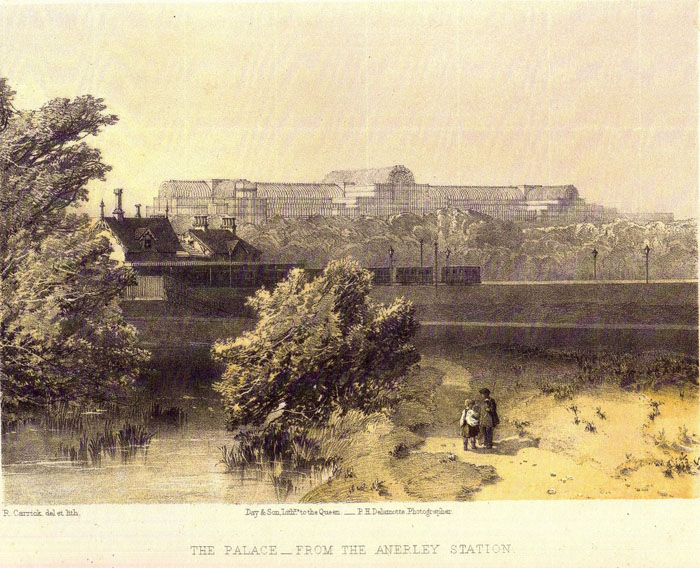
Anerley Gardens, around 1860, Anerley Railway Station and The Crystal Palace can be seen in the Background

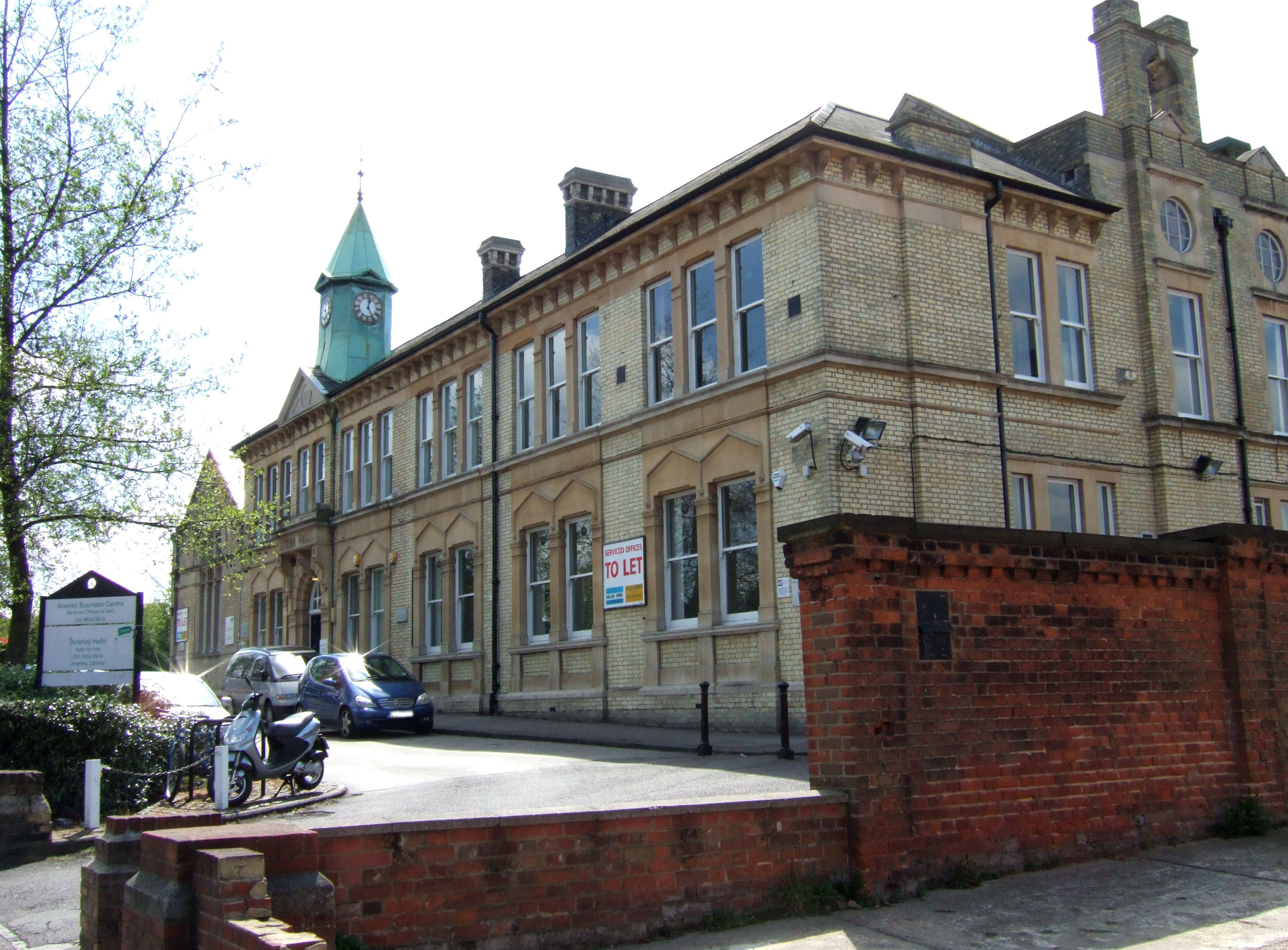
Anerley Town Hall built in 1878

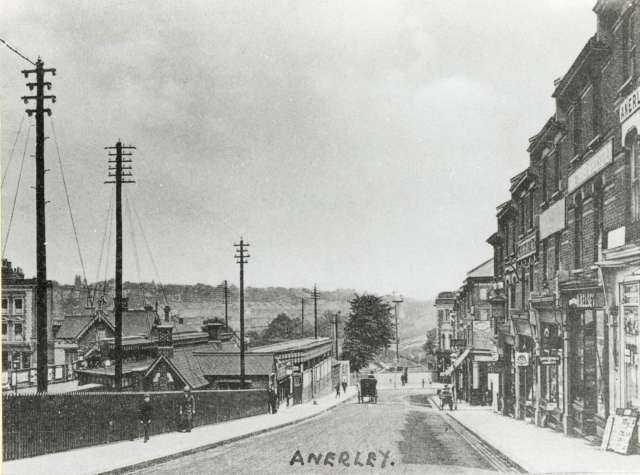
Anerley Station Road in 1900, Anerley Railway station can be seen on the left, the Anerley Arms can be seen on the extreme left, and the buildings on the right are still there to this day.

Anerley Gardens opened in 1841, and provided entertainment to the growing 19th century leisure industry. With the new medium of rail travel and boasting its own station, Anerley become a desirable social venue, with regular dances, a boating lake, a Swiss cottage and a maze. The old Croydon Canal was also a popular destination for anglers. The pleasure gardens closed in 1868, due to competition from the nearby Crystal Palace. After the closure of the gardens, The Anerley Arms, a hotel built in the Swiss-style which had catered to visitors, was expanded and rebuilt in Victorian classical style, this building still stands next to the station. The present day Anerley Arms is referred to in the Sherlock Holmes story The Adventure of the Norwood Builder and celebrates its connection with the story. As the result of a gas explosion in 1978 the ground floor was destroyed but no-one was injured. The badly damaged pub was sold by Charrington Brewery to Samuel Smith's in 1979. Restoration work was undertaken using traditional materials to restore the interior back to its Victorian appearance.

=== 1860 to 1939 ===
From the 1860s the residential area rapidly developed, grand Victorian houses were built along Anerley Road, and Anerley became part of the Parish of St Paul's, forming in 1861. Anerley Vestry Hall (later Anerley Town Hall) was built in 1878 for the sum of £4,341, to conduct public business for the exclave Hamlet of Penge in the Parish of Battersea. It became a Town Hall in 1900 as a result of the London Government Act 1899, when Anerley became part of the new Penge Urban District in Kent. The Hall was enlarged in 1911 for the sum of £3,229 and contained offices, a public hall, the council chamber, committee rooms, and a petty sessional court which opened in 1925.

=== World War II ===
During World War II Anerley suffered extensive bomb damage, with five V1 rockets landing; a further six landed in Crystal Palace Park and a total of 23 in the whole SE20 district. On 18 June 1944 it was reported a V1 Rocket was being chased by a Spitfire, and then shot down by AA gun fire. The shot down V1 fell upon Anerley Park near the junction of Anerley Road. Two people were killed and the damage to property were three houses destroyed with a further 20 houses severely damaged. On 11 July 1944 the third V1 Rocket strike to hit Anerley landed on Anerley Road at the Junction with Crystal Palace railway station. People had heard the rocket cut out and ran for cover, with many failing to find any, resulting in 11 deaths. The shops on Crystal Palace Station Road were totally destroyed, and on Anerley Road 18 shops were demolished, eight shops and seven houses severely damaged and 84 houses suffered minor damage. The Paxton Arms public house on Anerley Hill was also partially destroyed and would not re-open until 1955. The last rocket would strike Anerley 24 August 1944.

=== 1945 to present ===
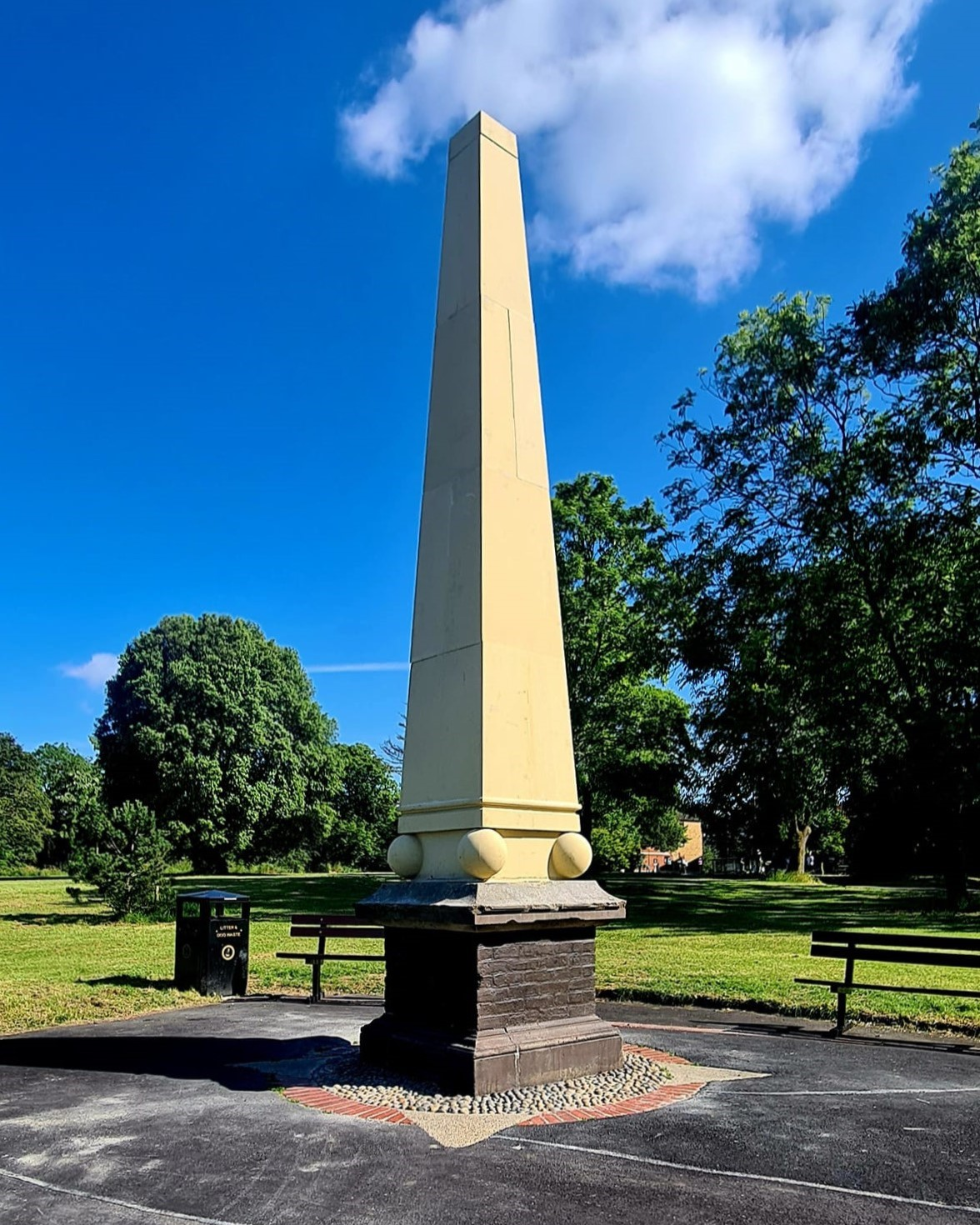
Heart of Anerley obelisk in Betts Park

By the beginning of the 20th century, Anerley's heyday was over, with much of the grand Victorian houses being converted into flats. In the 1960s and 1970s housing estates were constructed on former bombs sites and "slum clearances" to ease the post-war housing shortages. In 1965, following a government report by Sir Edwin Herbert, the short-lived Penge Urban District Council was abolished and Anerley and Penge were incorporated into the new London Borough of Bromley. With the demise of local government Crystal Palace & Anerley became a ward in the London Borough of Bromley.

Nowadays Anerley Town Hall is still in use as a community centre run by Crystal Palace Community Trust, the Anerley Arms is still serving beverages in a traditional saloon bar, and a segment of the Croydon Canal remains in Betts Park. The name Anerley is mainly applied to the district around the western half of the SE20 postcode in the proximity of Anerley railway station, to the north around Anerley Hill and Crystal Palace railway station in the SE19 postcode, and to the south as far as Birkbeck station (near the traditional Kent-Surrey boundary). The SE20 postcode district was officially named Anerley but covered Anerley, Penge and parts of Beckenham.

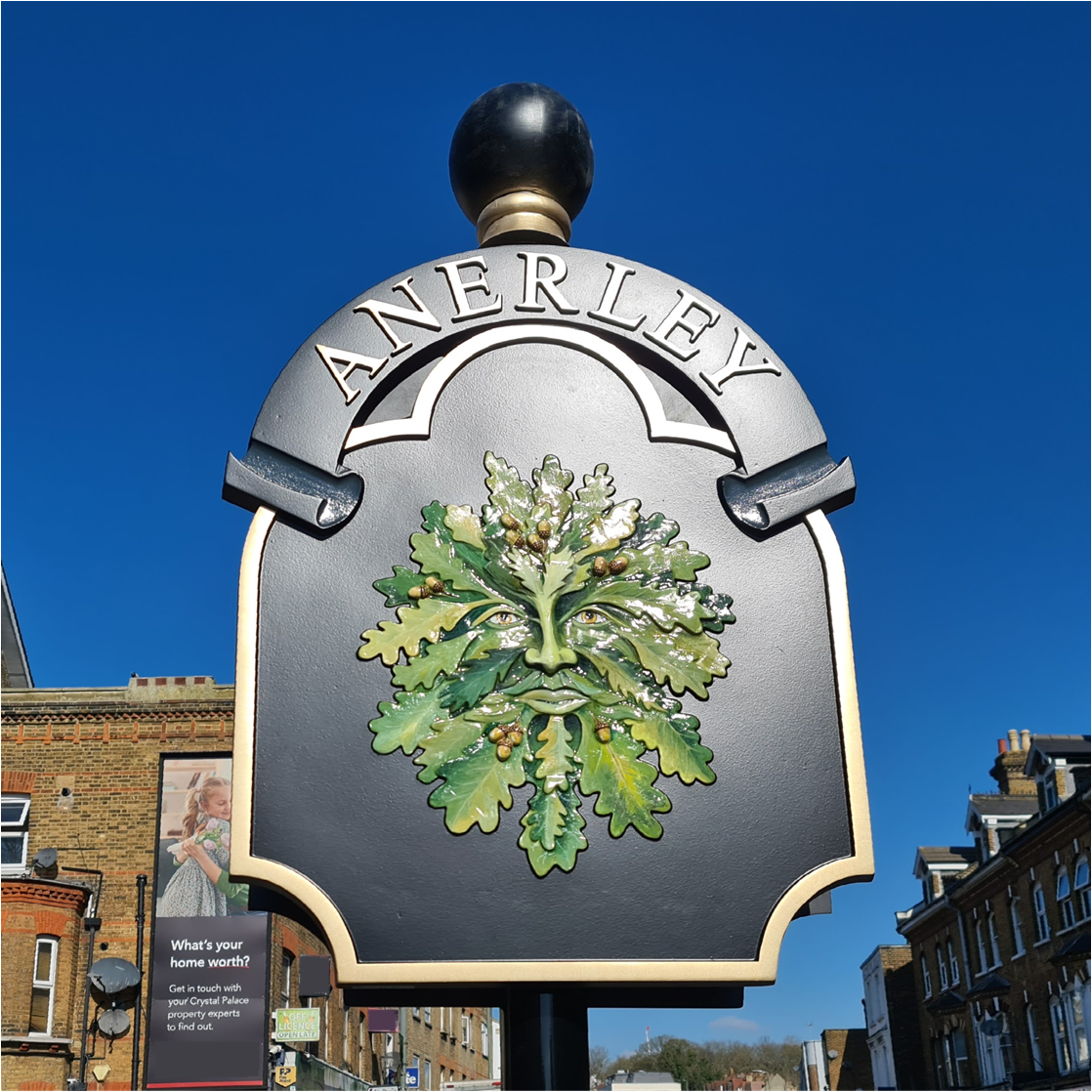
Anerley Green Man Town Sign

In 2024 the Heart of Anerley obelisk was erected in Betts Park in advance of the bicentenary celebrations in 2027. In March 2025 a town sign featuring the symbol of a green man was erected on the Anerley Road.

== Transport ==
=== Buses ===
Anerley is served by London buses routes N3, 75, 157, 197, 249, 354, 358 432 and bus 356. The 432 and 249 now terminate at Anerley Bus stand, behind the railway station on Anerley Station Road.

=== Road ===
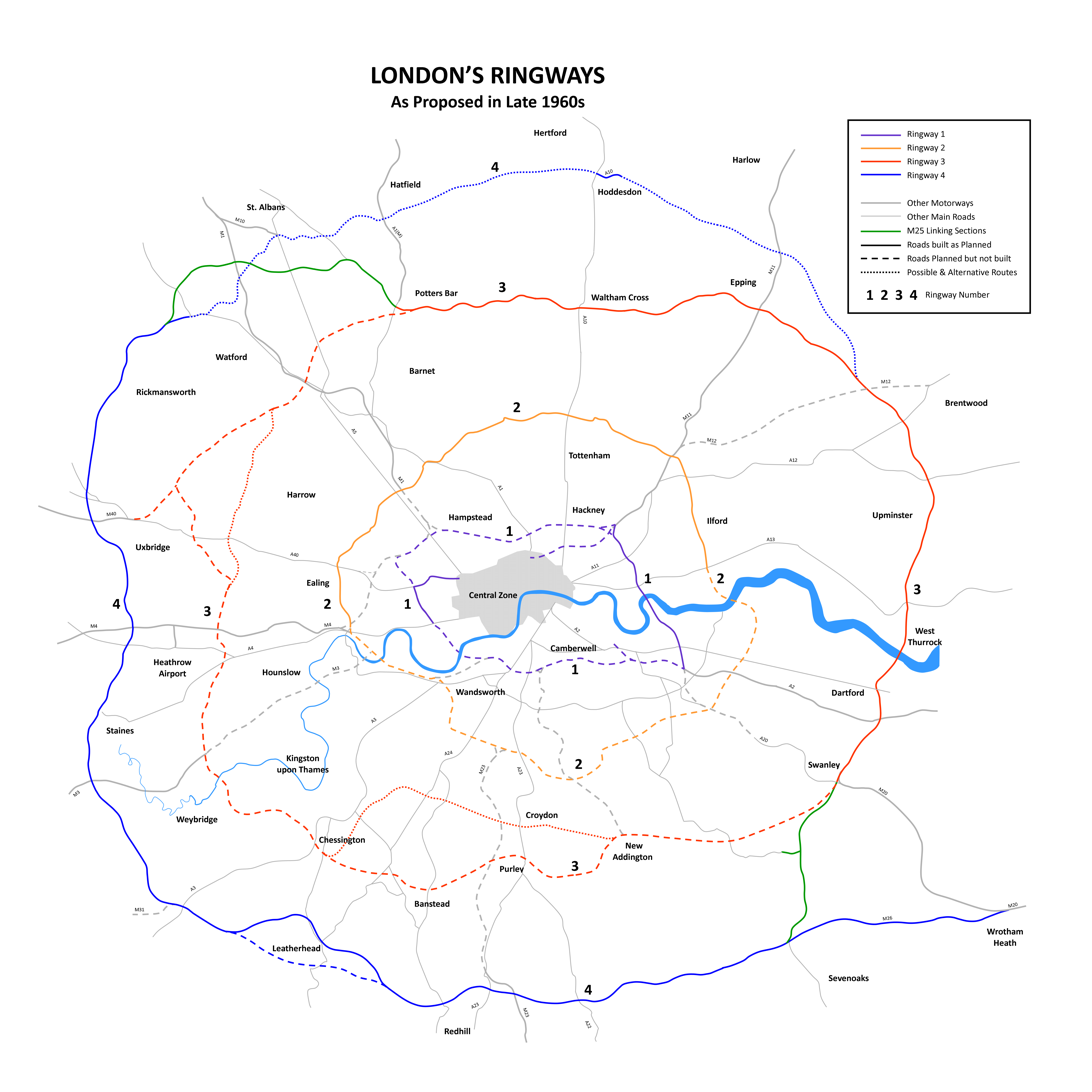
Plan of Ringways 1, 2, 3 and 4

Two A roads, the A213 and A214 pass through the area. During the late 1960s and 1970s the A214 was to be part of the London Ringways project. The A214 was to become Ringway 2 and it would have passed through much of Anerley, and have followed the railway line from Birkbeck station and travelled north. The construction of the A214 into the planned London Motorways network (much like the A2 or Hammersmith flyover London section today), would have seen a lot of destruction of property in Anerley and a great increase in noise pollution. After much consultation and Government dithering the various London Ringway projects were cancelled, including the A214 section.

=== Rail ===
- Anerley railway station, Southern rail services to London Bridge and East Croydon were halted in September 2022. London Overground continues to operate the Windrush Line (formerly East London line) from Highbury and Islington station to West Croydon.
- Birkbeck station, operated by Southern, runs trains from London Bridge to Beckenham via Peckham Rye.
- Crystal Palace railway station, operated by Southern runs trains to London Victoria and London Bridge as well as Windrush line services to Highbury and Islington.

=== Trams ===
- Birkbeck station, Transport for London (TFL) operate from Birkbeck to Beckenham Junction and Croydon.

In the era of street trams, a tramway ran down Anerley Road, turning into Croydon Road. It joined the main tram network at West Croydon. In the early days a stationary engine was needed to haul trams up the steepest part of Anerley Hill. Later models were able to climb unassisted, but special gearing was designed exclusively for this route. The tramway was replaced by trolley buses on route 654 which operated until 1959.

TFL had proposed the extension of Tramlink services from Harrington Road tram stop to the bus station on Crystal Palace Parade via Anerley Road, with a consultation exercise on the matter finishing in December 2006. However the then Mayor of London Boris Johnson cancelled the £170 million extension in November 2008.

== Notable residents ==
- Ira Aldridge, noted African-American Shakespearean actor, lived at 5 Hamlet Road.
- Arthur Bigsworth, aviator was born in Anerley in 1885, said to be the inspiration for W. E. Johns' fictional hero Biggles.
- James Busby, authored the Treaty of Waitangi and introduced vines to Australia, died at 5 Oak Grove Terrace after travelling back to England for an eye operation.
- Thomas Crapper, notable plumber (who did not invent the flush toilet, but promoted it), on his retirement lived at 12 Thornsett Road.
- George Daniels, noted watchmaker, lived at 21 Thornsett Road.
- Benjamin Waterhouse Hawkins, artist who designed the Crystal Palace dinosaurs, lived at 22 Belvedere Road.
- Walter de la Mare, famous poet and author of ghost stories, resided at 14 Thornsett Road from 1912 to 1925.
- Dadabhai Naoroji, the 'grand old man of India', an Indian nationalist and MP for Finsbury Central, lived at 72 Anerley Park.
- Marie Stopes, Victorian-era promoter of birth control and sex education, lived at 28 Cintra Park.
- Francis Godolphin Osbourne Stuart, photographer and postcard publisher lived at Hamlet Terrace in the 1870s.

== Nearest places ==
- Beckenham
- Penge
- South Norwood
- Sydenham
- Upper Norwood
- Crystal Palace
- Elmers End

== Sources ==
- Abbott, Peter; The Anerley Writers Circle (2002). The Book of Penge, Anerley & Crystal Palace: The Community, Past, Present & Future. Halsgrove. ISBN 978-1-8411-4210-4.
- Hibbert, Christopher; Ben Weinreb (2008). The London Encyclopaedia. Macmillan Reference. ISBN 978-1-4050-4924-5.
- Howard Turner, Charles (1977). The London Brighton and South Coast Railway. 1 Origins and Formation (1st ed.). London: Batsford. ISBN 0-7134-0275-X.
