= Anerley railway station =

National rail station in London, England

Anerley
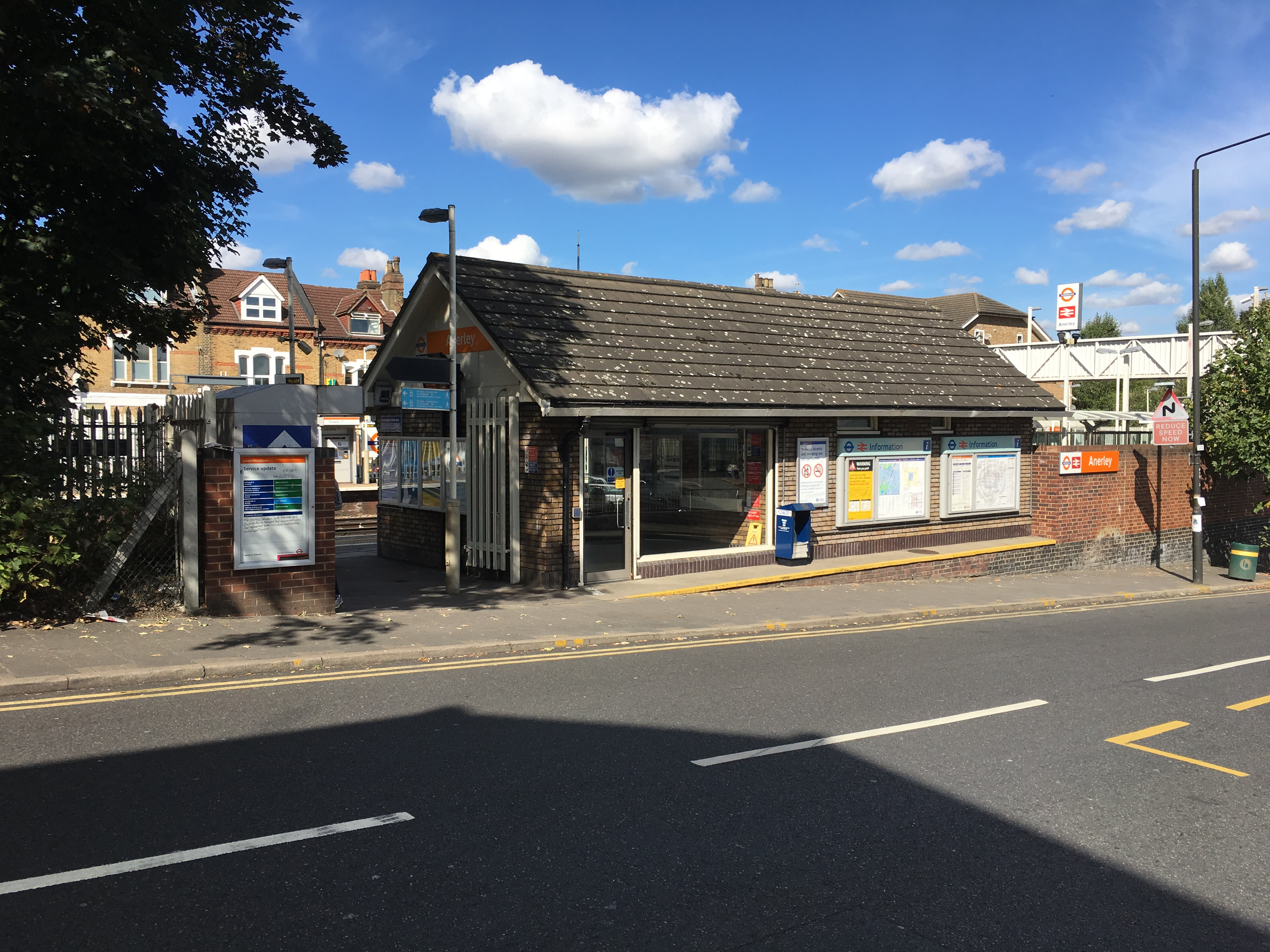
- Interactive map of Anerley

General information
- Location: Anerley
- Local authority: London Borough of Bromley
- Managed by: London Overground
- Owner: Network Rail
- Station code: ANZ
- DfT category: E
- Number of platforms: 2
- Tracks: 4
- Accessible: Yes
- Fare zone: 4

National Rail annual entry and exit
- 2020–21: ▼0.325 million
- 2021–22: ▲0.728 million
- 2022–23: ▲0.901 million
- 2023–24: ▲0.945 million
- 2024–25: ▲0.949 million

Key dates
- 5 June 1839: Station opened as Anerley Bridge
- 1840: Station renamed Anerley
- 23 May 2010: London Overground extension sees first Overground trains
- September 2022: Southern services withdrawn to only a Parliamentary service.

Other information
- External links: Departures; Facilities
- Coordinates: 51.4147°N 0.067°W

Anerley is a station on the Windrush line of the London Overground, located in the London Borough of Bromley in south London. It is 7 miles 47 chains (7.59 miles, 12.21 km) down the line from London Bridge, in London fare zone 4. Additional limited peak-time National Rail services operated by Southern also call at Anerley.

The main building on the down side (which is only open on weekdays/Saturday mornings) replaced an original building which was on the up platform. This was in turn replaced by two shelters on the Up platform. There is a bridge connecting the two platforms. Four lines run through the station, the central pair being the Up and Down through lines. The station stands off Anerley Road (A214).

== History ==
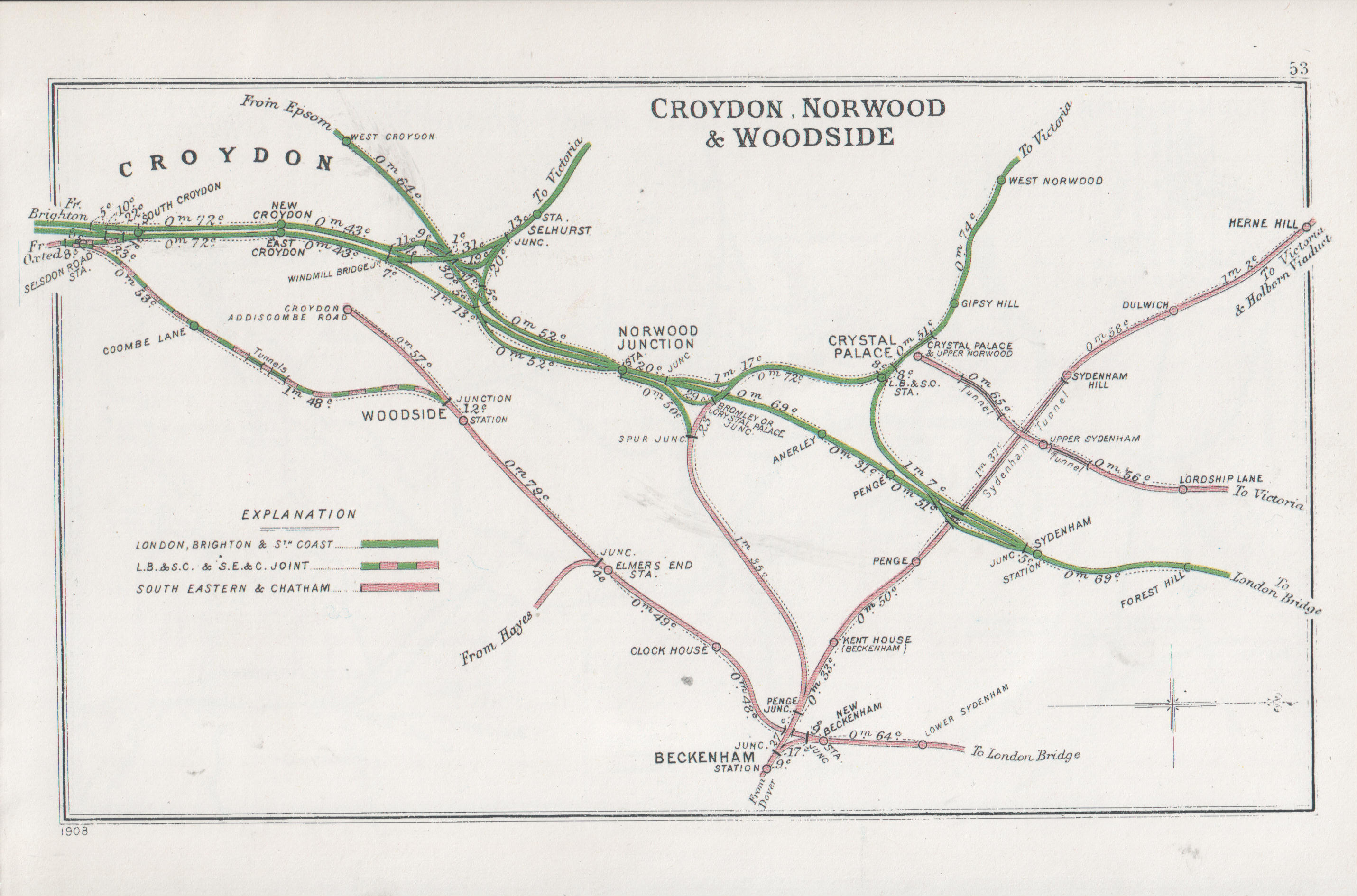
A 1908 Railway Clearing House map of lines around the Brighton Main Line between South Croydon and Selhurst/Forest Hill, as well as surrounding lines

The station was opened originally as Anerley Bridge by the London and Croydon Railway in 1839. It was situated in a largely unpopulated area, but was built as part of an agreement with the local landowner.

According to local lore, the landowner was a Scotsman and, when asked for the landmark by which the station would be known, he replied "Mine is the annerly hoose". The timetable of the day seems to back this up since it says "There is no place of that name".

The London and Croydon Railway amalgamated with the London and Brighton Railway to form the London, Brighton and South Coast Railway in July 1846, and the station was rebuilt during the widening of the main line during 1849–50.

During the Grouping of 1923 the station became part of the Southern Railway, and then passed on to the Southern Region of British Railways on nationalisation in 1948.

When Sectorisation was introduced in the 1980s, the station was served by Network SouthEast until the Privatisation of British Rail.

Anerley formed part of the new southward extension to the East London line (now the Windrush line) that opened on 23 May 2010, making Anerley part of the London Overground network. At the same time, management of the station passed from Southern to London Overground under Arriva Rail London.

== Services ==
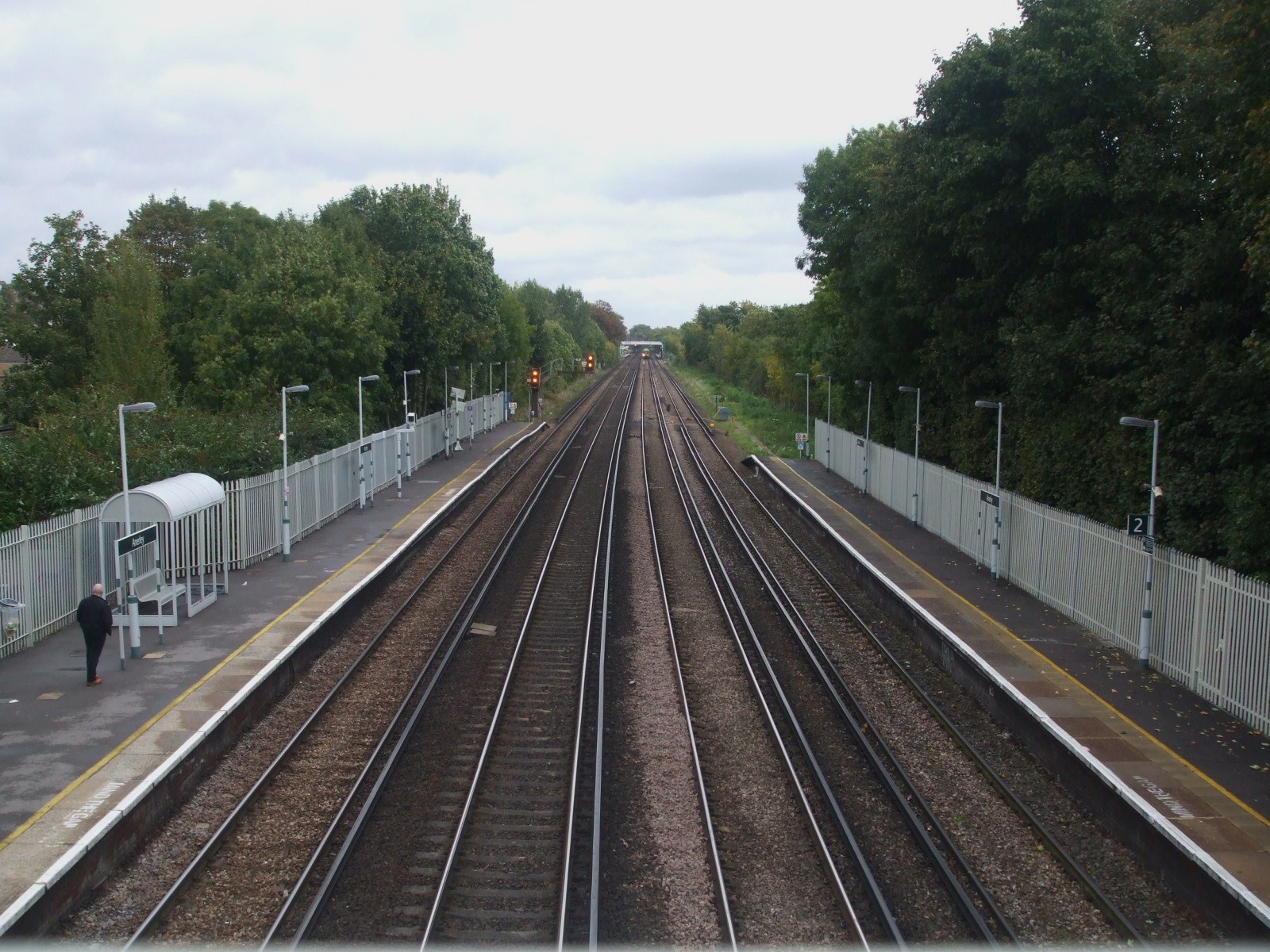
The view of the station platforms from the footbridge, looking northbound. Penge West station can be seen in the distance.

Off-peak, all services at Anerley are operated by the Windrush line of the London Overground using Class 378 EMUs.

The typical off-peak service in trains per hour is:

- 4 tph to Highbury & Islington via Surrey Quays
- 4 tph to West Croydon

The station is also served by a limited Southern service to/from London Bridge in the peak hours. All day off peak services to London Bridge were axed in September 2022. These services are operated using Class 377 EMUs.

Preceding station	National Rail	Following station
Penge West	Southern Brighton Main Line; Stopping Services Limited Service	Norwood Junction
Preceding station	London Overground	Following station
Penge West towards Highbury & Islington	Windrush line East London line	Norwood Junction towards West Croydon

== Connections ==
London Buses routes 157, 249, 354, 358, 432 and night route N3 serve the station.
