= Colonial and Indian Exhibition (1905) =

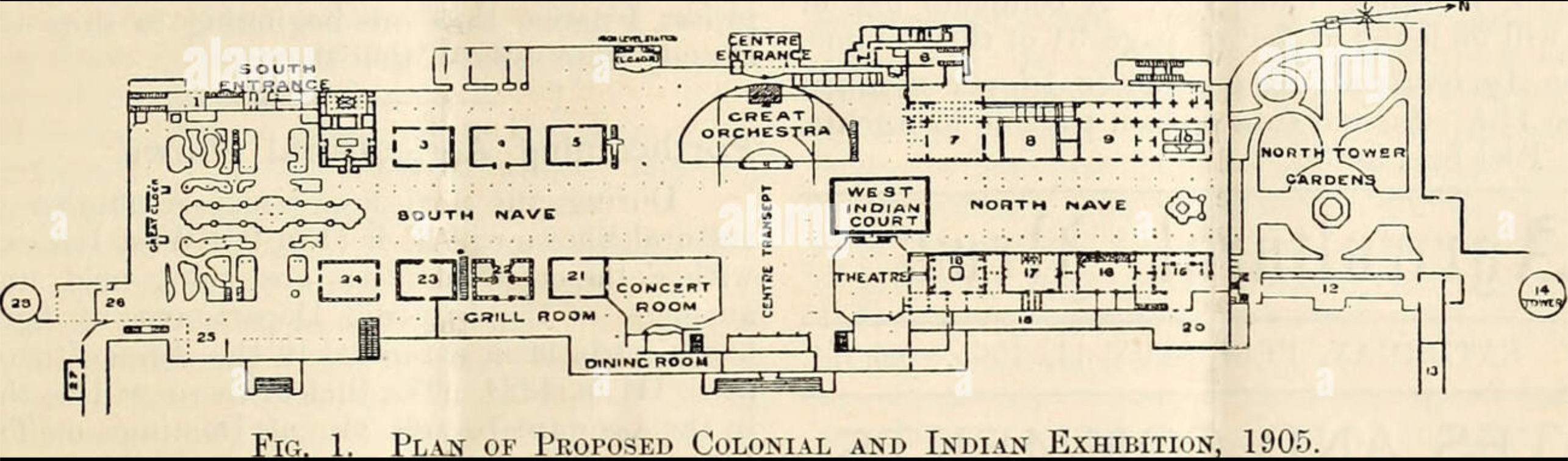
Plan of the proposed Colonial and Indian Exhibition, 1905

The 1905 Colonial and Indian Exhibition took place at the Crystal Palace in London and is reported to have been larger and more popular than the 1895 African Exhibition and the most direct forerunner of the 1911 Festival of Empire, two other colonial events that took place at the same site.

== Purpose ==
The 1905 Colonial and Indian Exhibition at Crystal Palace aimed to ‘offer to the people of the United Kingdom an object lesson which would demonstrate that the British Empire produces all the necessaries and luxuries of life in quantities large enough to supply the wants of all its inhabitants’ and hoped to boost ‘inter-Imperial trading’. Those that organised the exhibition are reported in The Times, 12 October 1904, as saying there would be ‘no better site’ than the Crystal Palace ‘for this Imperial undertaking than the vast house of glass constructed for the epoch-making exhibition of 1851.’

== Contents ==
The plan of the proposed Colonial and Indian Exhibition, 1905, shows a West Indian Court along with Concert Room, Great Orchestra and Theatre and twenty other exhibits unlabelled on the plan.

It was reported in the Marlborough Express newspaper on 27 October 1905 that the New Zealand displays gained numerous awards at the exhibition. Thirteen grand prizes were awarded for the exhibit representing New Zealand dairy, meat, grain and wool industries. Twenty-six gold medals, five silver medals and one bronze medal were awarded for other displays of colonial industries in New Zealand ranging from tinned fish to oil painting.
