= 1895 African Exhibition =

Event at The Crystal Palace in London

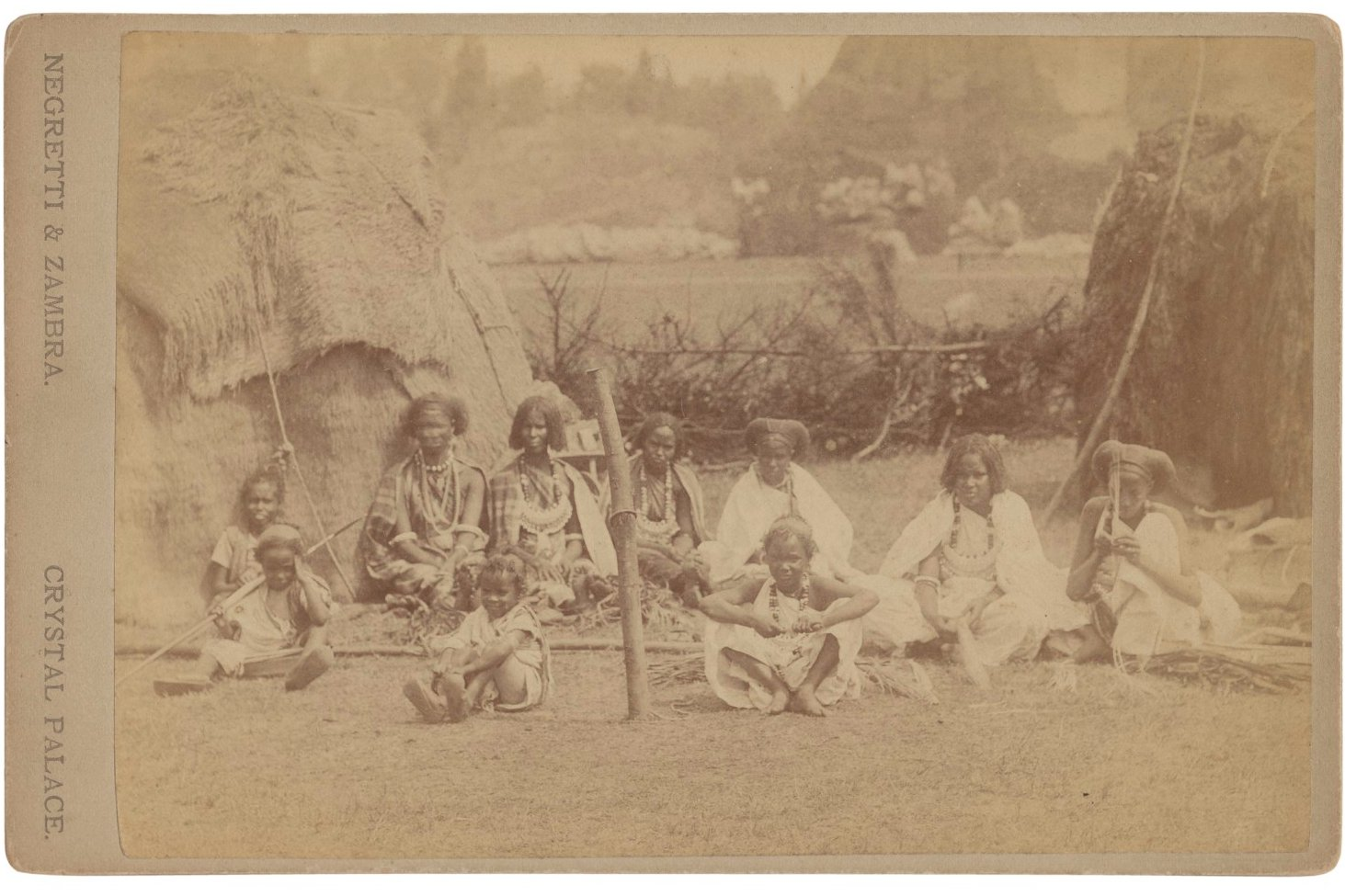
Somali people at The Crystal Palace in 1895

The 1895 African Exhibition at The Crystal Palace was an instance of a human zoo in London. The colonial exhibition presented around eighty people of Bantu origin brought from Somalia along with two-hundred African animals.

== History ==
The exhibition was organised by Carl Hagenbeck and Josef Menges as an effort to rehabilitate the Crystal Palace which was becoming less popular among visitors.

== Display ==
The men were from Hawiye clans in Somalia. The "exhibits" at the human zoo spent their time in a kraal but slept in covered buildings due to the cold weather. They were wearing exotic animal skins and had red mud in their hair. During the exhibition, they had to perform national sports and dances multiple times a day, set up and take down of their accommodation and cook food. The people also had to mimic "warfare" where different tribes attack each other until Europeans arrive to end the conflict.

The display included large paintings and set pieces representing Somalia. These served as a backdrop when all the people and the animals formed a "caravan" and passed through the space.

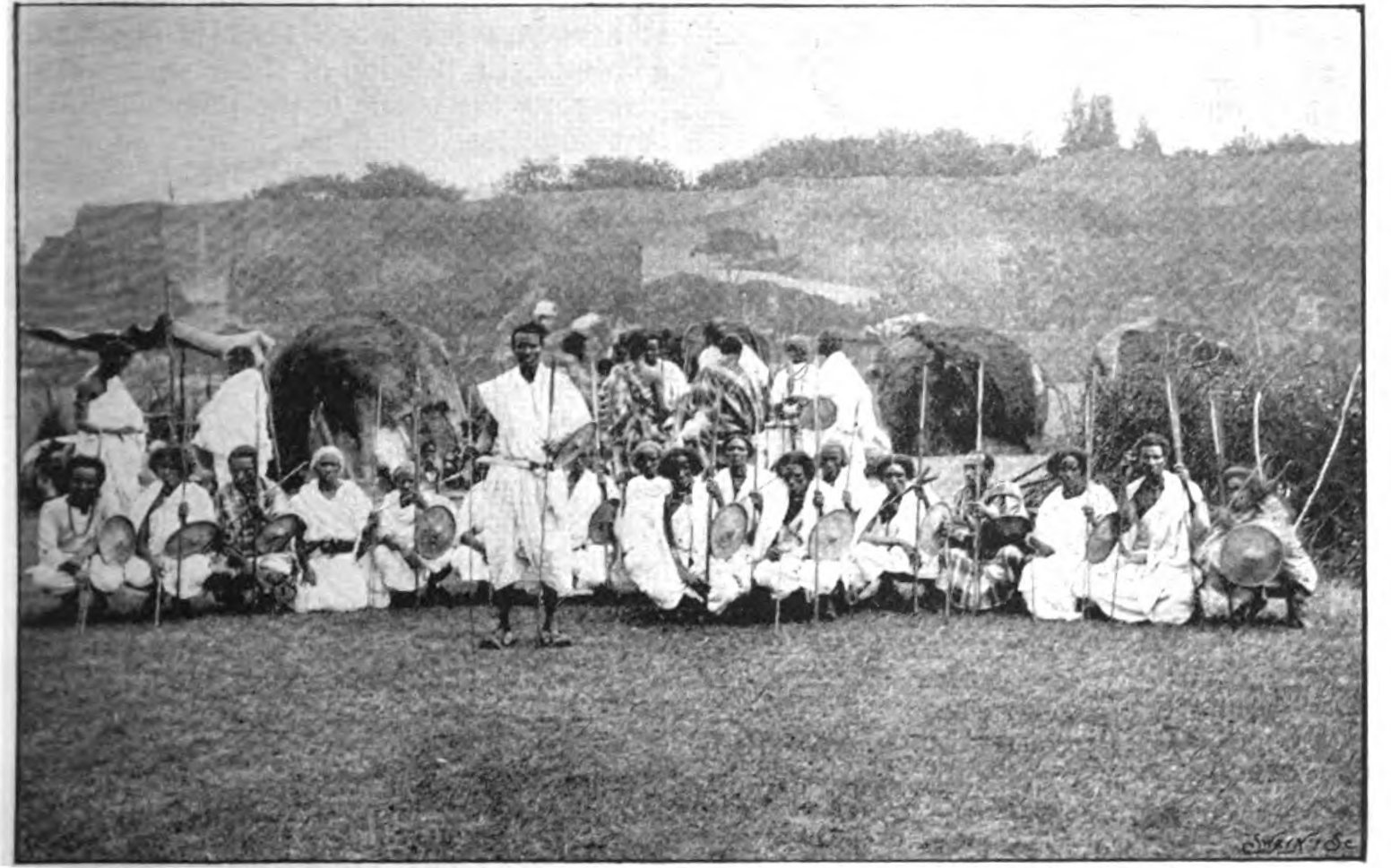
Somali village at the 1895 African Exhibition

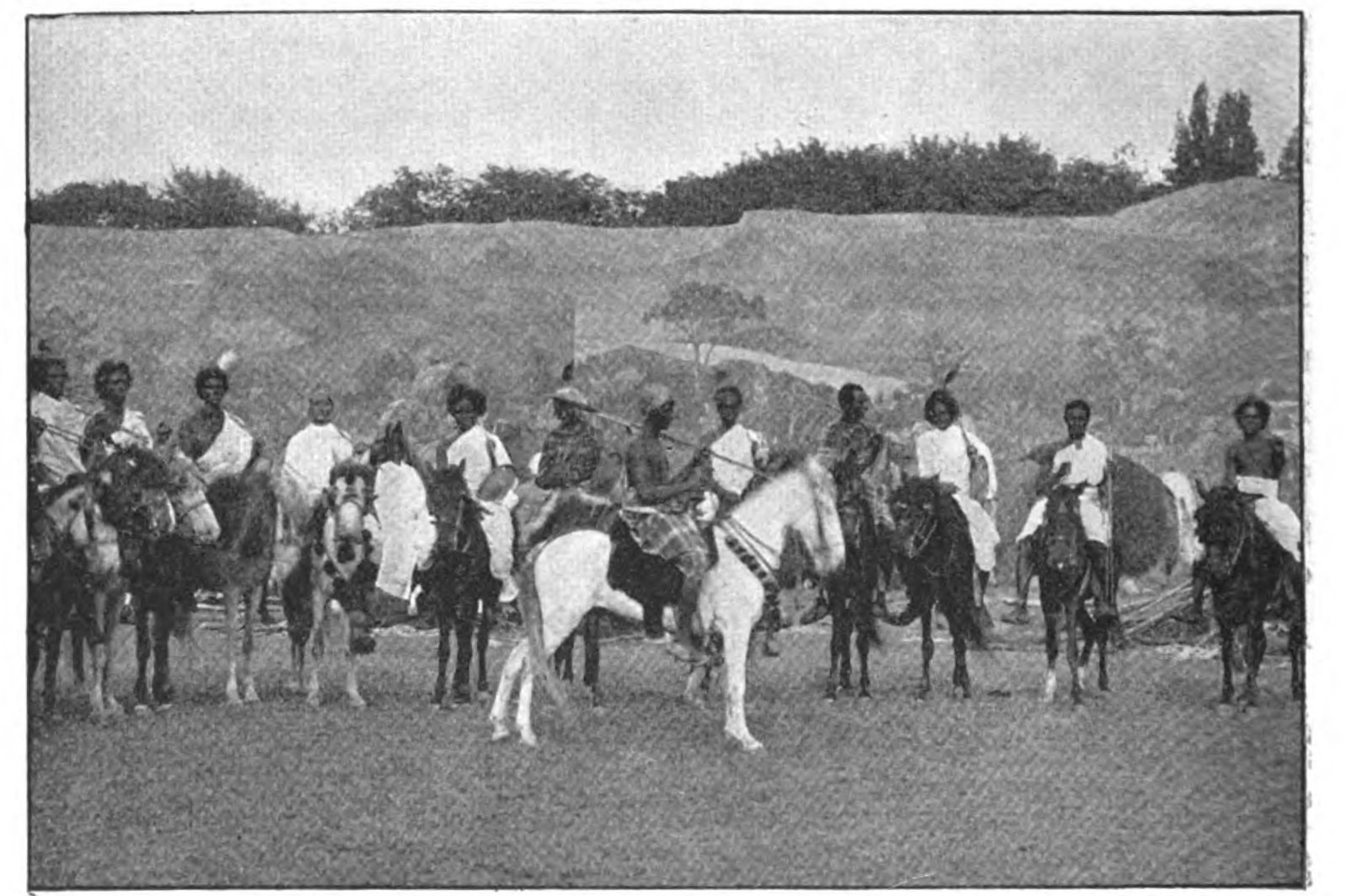
Somali people at the 1895 African Exhibition

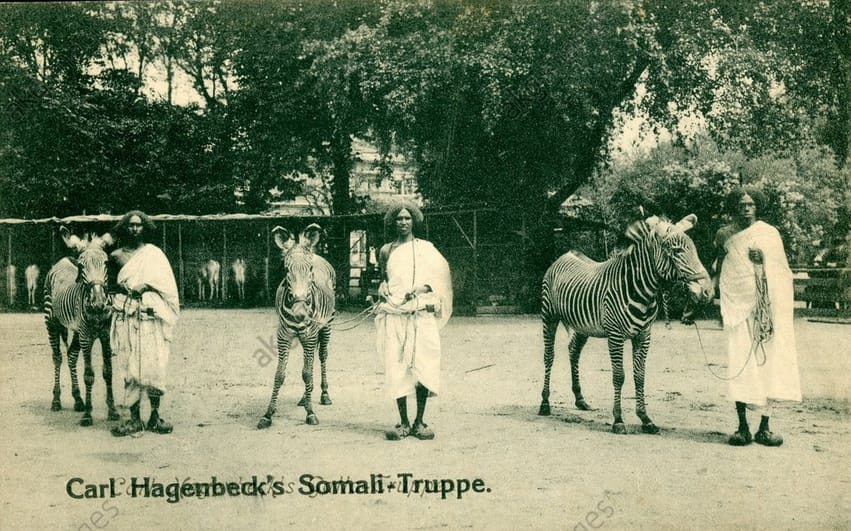
Carl Hagenbeck's Somali Troupe
