= Roberto Gargiani =

Italian architectural historian

- Occupations: Architectural historian Professor at École Polytechnique Fédérale de Lausanne
- Title: Professor

Academic work
- Discipline: Theory and history of architecture
- Website: https://www.epfl.ch/labs/lth3/

Roberto Gargiani (born September 1956) is an Italian architectural historian and a full professor at the École Polytechnique Fédérale de Lausanne (EPFL).

== Biography ==
Gargiani was born in September 1956 in Poggio a Caiano, Italy. He graduated in architecture in 1983 and received his PhD in 1992 at the Faculty of Architecture of the University of Florence.

He was successively appointed associate professor of architectural history at the École nationale supérieure d'architecture de Normandie (ENSA) (1994–97), at the École d'Architecture de la Ville et des Territoires Marne-la-Vallée (1998-2000), and at the Faculty of Architecture of Roma Tre University (1998-2005), where he was then promoted to full professor.

In 2005, he was appointed professor at the École Polytechnique Fédérale de Lausanne (EPFL), where he is the head of the Laboratory of Theory and History of Architecture 3 (LTH3) and where he served as Director of the Architecture Department (2011–15) and of the Archives de la construction moderne (2015–2017).

== Research ==
His early research, carried out during the 1980s and 1990s, focused on 20th French century architecture and interiors, on Auguste Perret and his school, and on Le Corbusier. History of construction, from antiquity to the contemporary era, is the subject of books and essays on a wide range of topics, spanning from the construction of the Louvre colonnade in reinforced stone, to the libraries of Henri Labrouste, to the question of polychromy and its implications on the concept of truth of materials, to Gottfried Semper’s principle of cladding and its influences on techniques in modern architecture. The outcome of the research on the history of construction led to the publication of edited collections of essays dedicated to the essential elements of architecture - column, floor, platform, etc. In the mid-1990s he also focused his research on techniques, materials and structures of European Renaissance architecture, which resulted in a book on Italian architecture of the 15th century. In the early 2000s his research on contemporary architecture, in particular on Rem Koolhaas, Archizoom Associati and Superstudio, resulted in several monographic essays and an exposition. In 2008, he was awarded with the ERC Advanced Grant for a research entitled "The surfaces of cement and reinforced concrete. A history of formwork and processing of the surface, 1870-2008". In his collection Treatise on Concrete, curated by EPFL Press, Roberto Gargiani investigated on the protagonists of 20th century concrete architecture (Le Corbusier, Louis I. Kahn and Pier Luigi Nervi), explored crucial historical periods for the development of concrete structures (18th century), and tackled the role of this material in 20th century art.

== Main publications ==
- Valori primordiali e ideologici della materia, da Uncini a LeWitt. Sculture in calcestruzzo dal Novecento ad oggi, Aracne, Rome, 2018 (with A. Rosellini)
- Inside no-stop city: Parkings résidentiels et système climatique universel, B2, Paris, 2017
- The Rhetoric of Pier Luigi Nervi. Concrete and Ferrocement Forms, EPFL Press, Lausanne, Treatise on Concrete, 2016 (with A. Bologna)
- Louis I. Kahn, Exposed Concrete and Hollow Stones, 1949-1959, EPFL Press, Lausanne, Treatise on Concrete, 2014
- Concrete, from Archeology to Invention 1700-1769, EPFL Press, Lausanne, Treatise on Concrete, 2013
- L’architrave, le plancher, la plate-forme. Nouvelle histoire de la construction, PPUR, Lausanne, 2012 (curator)
- Le Corbusier: Béton Brut and Ineffable Space, 1940-1965, EPFL Press, Lausanne, 2011 (with A. Rosellini; German translation, Edition Detail, Berlin, 2014)
- Superstudio, Editori Laterza, Roma, Bari, 2010 (with B. Lampariello)
- Rem Koolhaas / OMA. The Construction of Merveilles, Presses polytechniques et universitaires romandes, Lausanne, 2008 (Japanese translation, Kajima Publishing, Tokyo, 2015)
- La colonne. Nouvelle histoire de la construction, PPUR, Lausanne, 2008 (curator)
- Archizoom Associati 1966-1974, dall'onda pop alla superficie neutra, Electa, Milan, 2007 (French translation, 2007)
- Rem Koolhaas/OMA, Editori Laterza, Rome-Bari, 2006
- Principi e costruzione nell’architettura italiana del Quattrocento, Editori Laterza, Rome-Bari, 2003
- Idea e costruzione del Louvre. Parigi cruciale nell’architettura moderna europea, Alinea, Florence, 1998
- Storia dell’architettura contemporanea, Editori Laterza, Roma-Bari, 1998 (con G. Fanelli; French translation, PPUR, Lausanne, 2008)
- Il principio del rivestimento. Prolegomena a una storia dell’architettura contemporanea, Editori Laterza, Roma-Bari, 1994,(with G. Fanelli; Spanish translation, 1999)
- Auguste Perret, 1874-1954. Teoria e opere, Electa, Milano, 1993 (French translation, Gallimard, Paris, 1994)
- Ornamento o nudità. Gli interni della casa in Francia. 1918-1939, Editori Laterza, Rome-Bari, 1993 (with G. Fanelli)
- Auguste Perret, Editori Laterza, Rome-Bari, 1991 (with G. Fanelli)
