= Bellwood =

Bellwood may refer to:

== People with the surname ==
- Bessie Bellwood (1856-1896), a popular British music hall performer of the Victorian era
- James Charles Bellwood, a New Zealand labourer, physical education instructor and sports coach
- Lucy Bellwood, an American cartoonist
- Pamela Bellwood, an American actress
- Peter Bellwood, a Professor of Archaeology

== Places in the United States ==
- Bellwood, Alabama, an unincorporated community
- Bellwood, Florida, an unincorporated community
- Bellwood (Atlanta), former name of the town, then from 1987 to 2007 neighborhood of Atlanta, now called Marietta Street Artery
- Bellwood, Illinois, a village
  - Bellwood station (Metra), rail station
- Bellwood, Louisiana, an unincorporated community
- Bellwood, Nebraska, a village
- Bellwood, Pennsylvania, a borough
- Bellwood Lake, a lake in Texas
- Bellwood, Virginia, a census-designated place
  - Bellwood (Richmond, Virginia), listed on the National Register of Historic Places in Chesterfield County, Virginia
- Bellwood, West Virginia, an unincorporated community
- Bellwood, Wisconsin, an unincorporated community

== Fictional places ==
- The protagonist's hometown (Ben Tennyson) on Cartoon Network's Ben 10 franchise.

== See also ==
- Belwood (disambiguation)
- Beltwood House
