= Grange Mills =

Coordinates: 51.445664°N 0.144242°W

- Location within Greater London
- London borough: Lambeth
- Ceremonial county: Greater London
- Region: London
- Country: England
- Sovereign state: United Kingdom
- Post town: LONDON
- Postcode district: SW12
- Dialling code: 020
- Police: Metropolitan
- Fire: London
- Ambulance: London
- London Assembly: Lambeth and Southwark

Grange Mills is a very small area of east Balham in the London Borough of Lambeth, England. Rarely appearing on maps, it is essentially little more than a small industrial estate, located off Weir Road (formerly Grove Road).
