= Belwood =

Belwood can refer to:

- Belwood, North Carolina
- Belwood, Ontario

== See also ==
- Bellwood (disambiguation)
- Beltwood House, London
