= Crystal Palace, London =

Residential area in London, England

Coordinates: 51.4203°N 0.0705°W

Crystal Palace
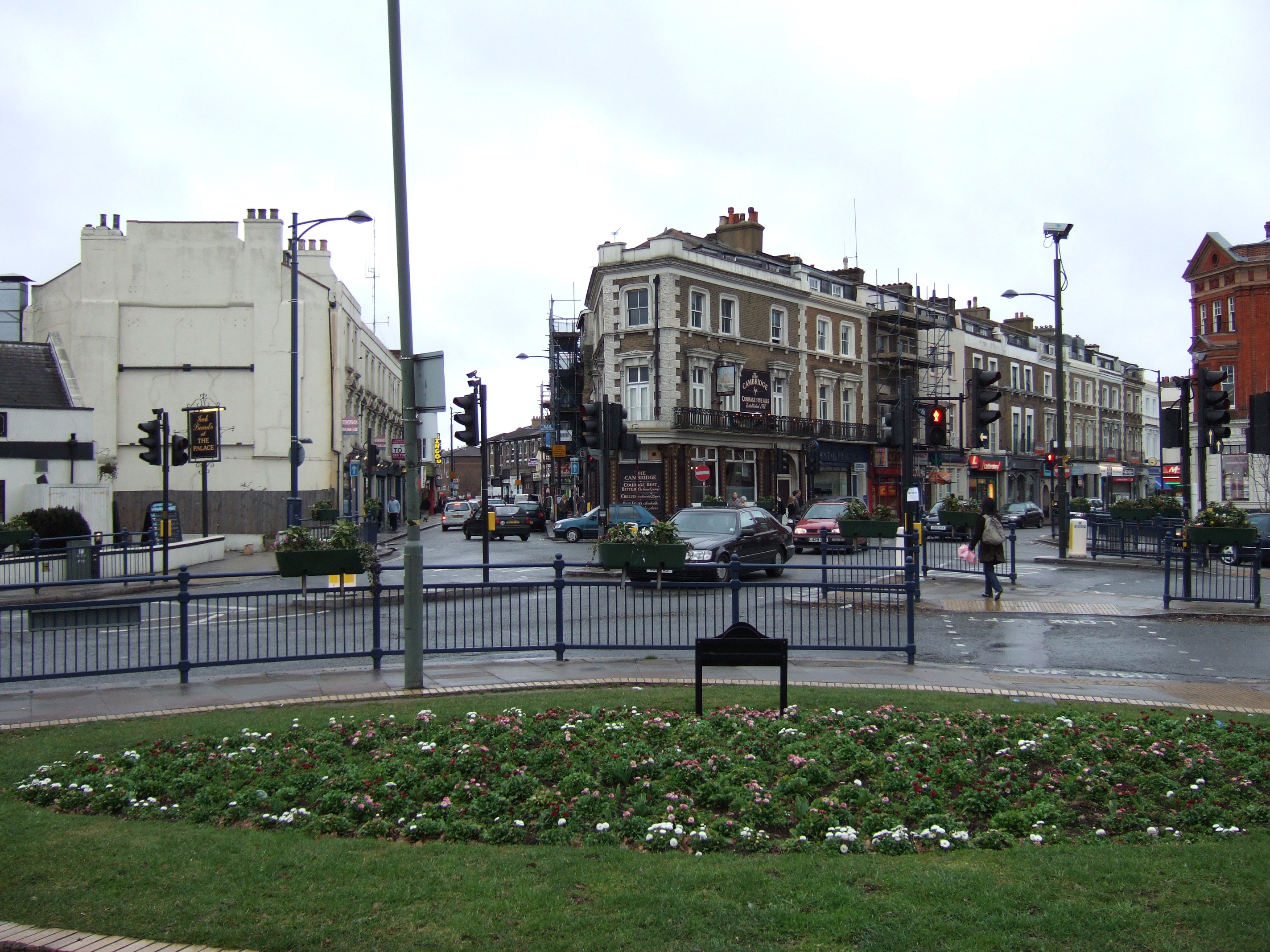
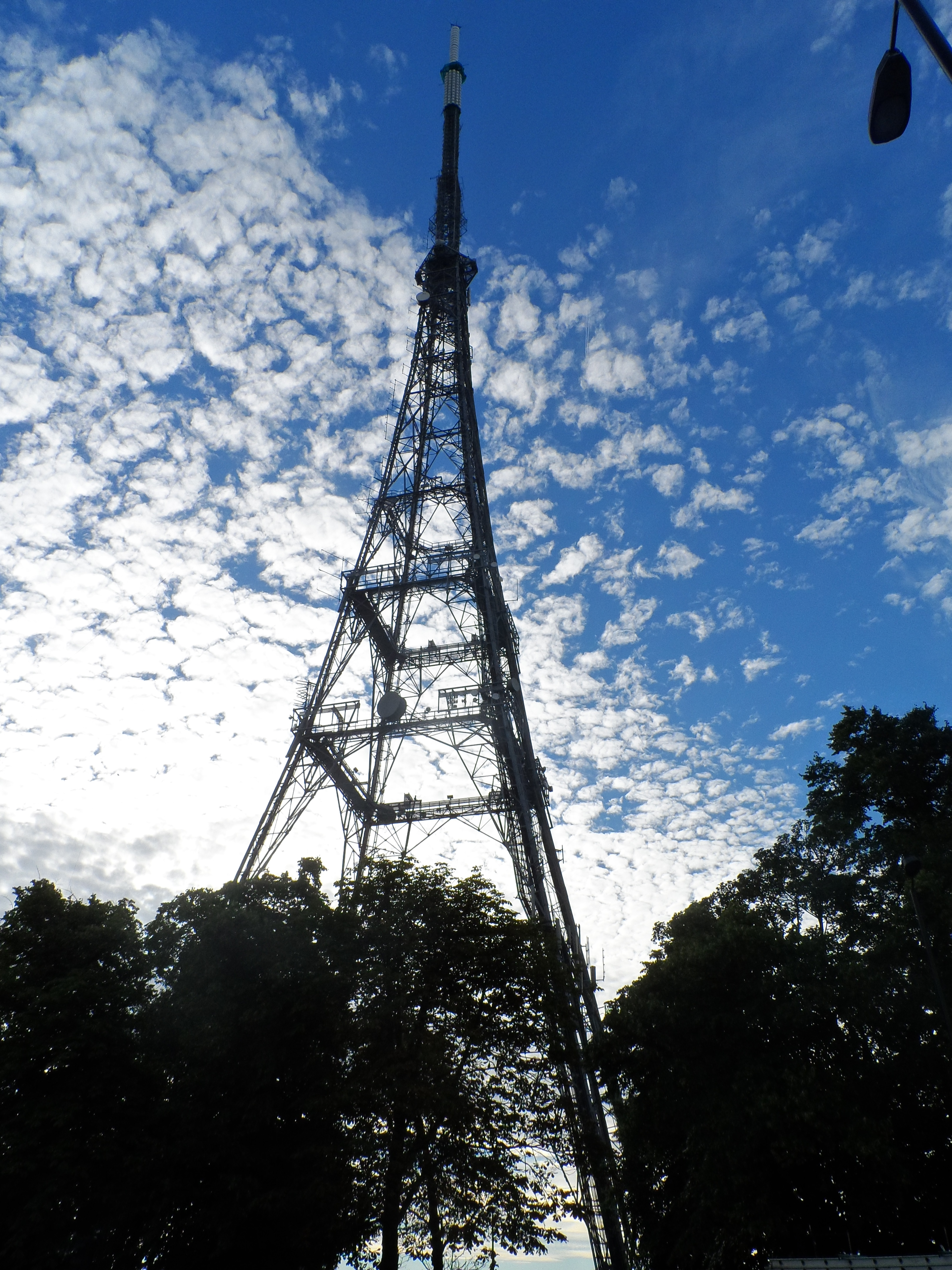
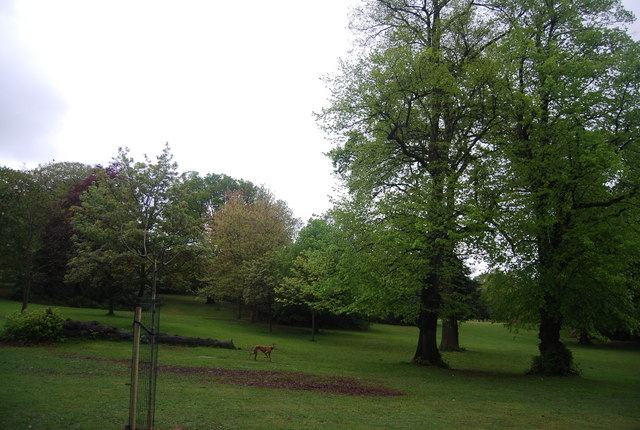
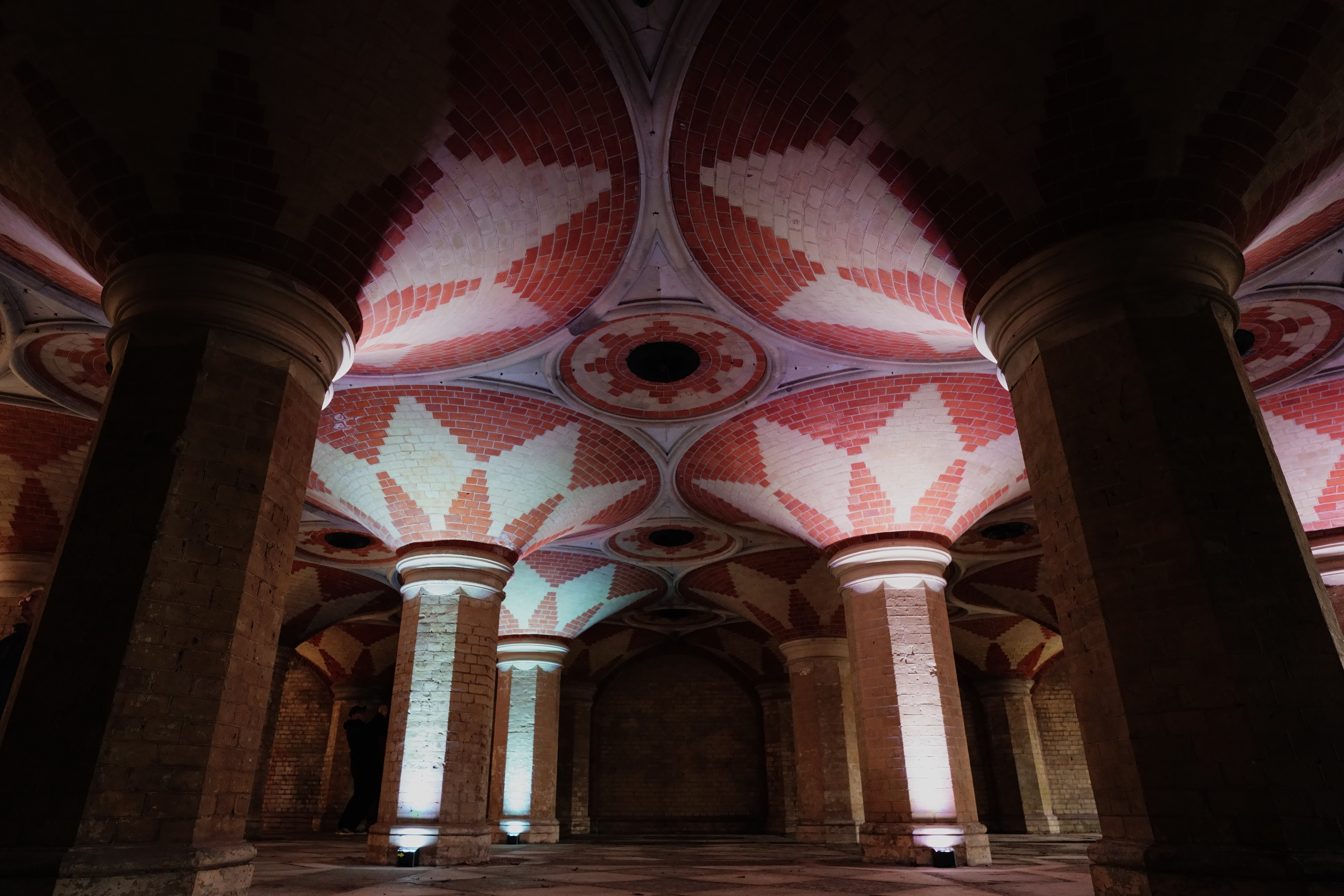
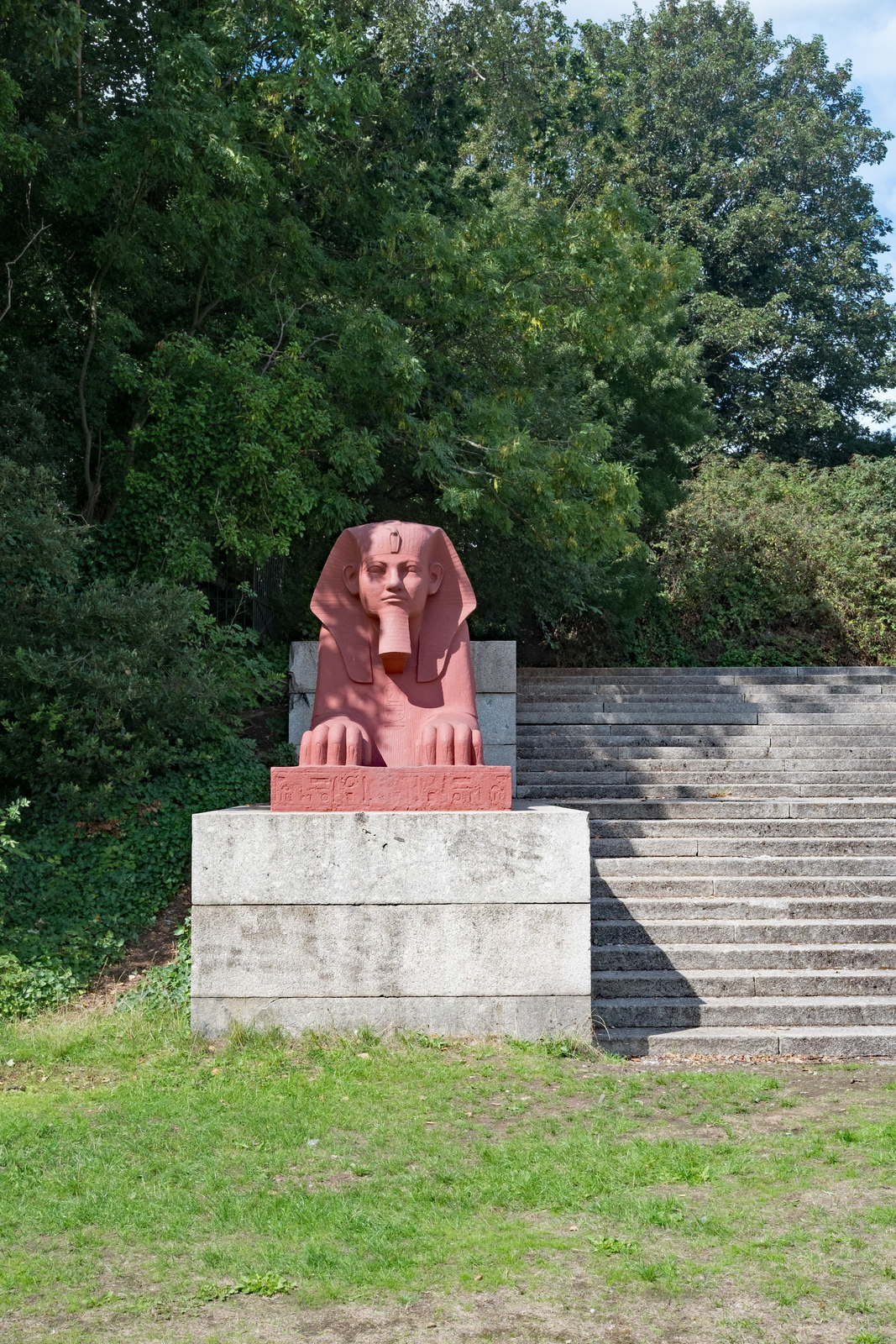
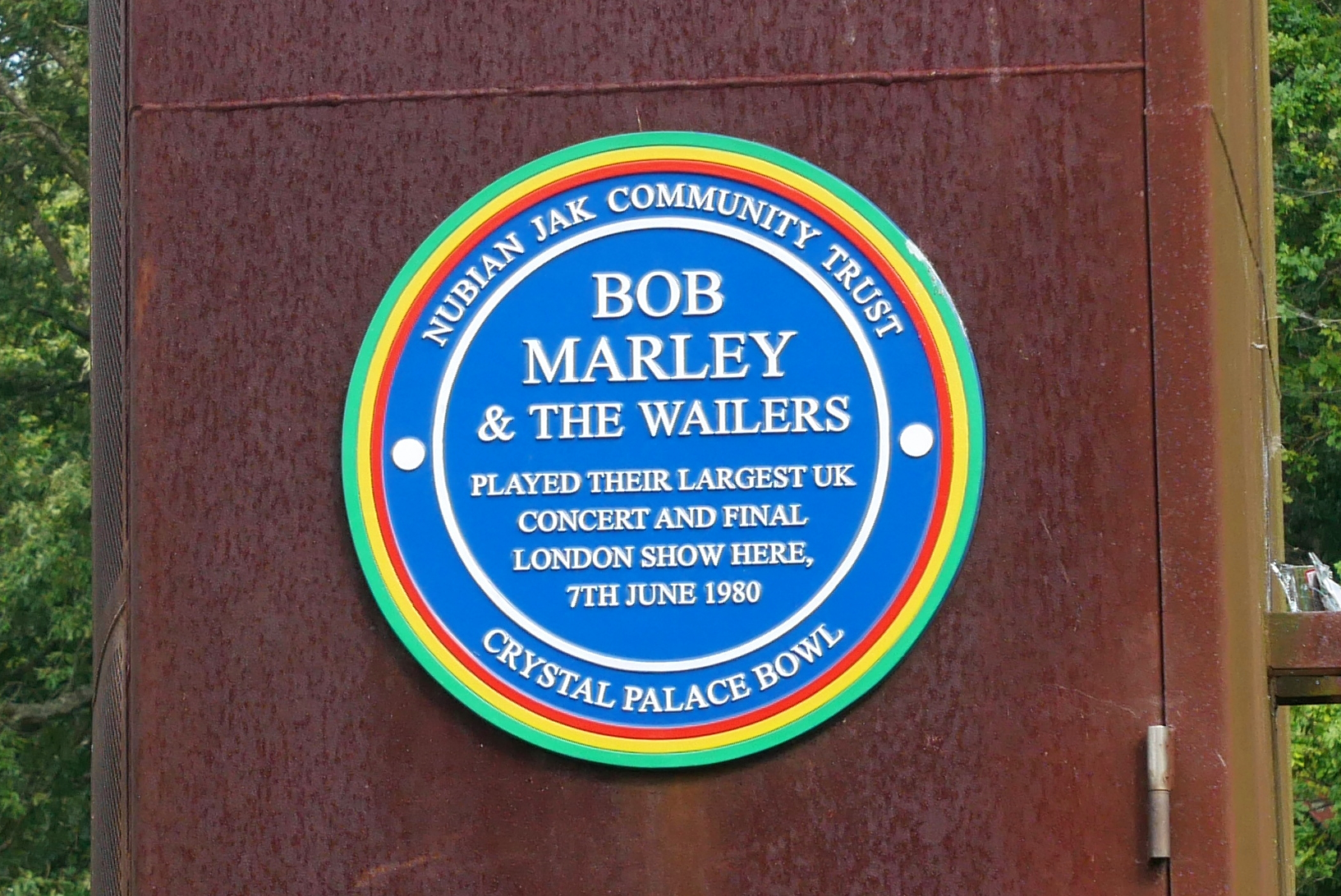
- Crystal Palace Parade Transmitter Park Subway Sphinxes Bob Marley Plaque at the Bowl

- Location within Greater London
- Population: 12,255 (2011 Census. Bromley Ward)
- OS grid reference: TQ341708
- London borough: Croydon; Bromley; Lewisham; Lambeth; Southwark
- Ceremonial county: Greater London
- Region: London
- Country: England
- Sovereign state: United Kingdom
- Post town: LONDON
- Postcode district: SE19, SE20, SE26
- Dialling code: 020
- Police: Metropolitan
- Fire: London
- Ambulance: London
- UK Parliament: Streatham and Croydon North; Dulwich and West Norwood; Lewisham West and Penge
- London Assembly: Croydon and Sutton; Bexley and Bromley; Greenwich and Lewisham

Crystal Palace is a place in South London, named after the Crystal Palace Exhibition building which stood in the area from 1854, until it was destroyed by a fire in 1936. About 7 miles (11 km) southeast of Charing Cross, it includes one of the highest points in London, at 367 feet (112 m), offering views over the capital.

The area has no defined boundaries and straddles five London boroughs and three postal districts, although there is a Crystal Palace electoral ward and Crystal Palace Park in the London Borough of Bromley. It forms a group of the greater area known as Upper Norwood, and is contiguous with the areas of Anerley, Dulwich Wood, Gipsy Hill, Penge, South Norwood and Sydenham. The area is represented by four parliamentary constituencies, four London Assembly constituencies and fourteen local councillors.

Until development began in the 19th century, and before the arrival of the Crystal Palace, the area was known as Sydenham Hill. The Norwood Ridge and an historic oak tree were used to mark parish boundaries. After the Crystal Palace burned down in 1936, the site of the building and its grounds became Crystal Palace Park, the location of the National Sports Centre which contains an athletics track, stadium and other sports facilities. Crystal Palace Park has also been used as the setting for a number of concerts and films, such as The Italian Job and The Pleasure Garden and contains the Crystal Palace Park Concert Platform, in place since 1997.

Two television transmitter masts make the district a landmark location, visible from many parts of Greater London. Local landmarks include the Crystal Palace Triangle, a shopping district made up of three streets forming a triangle; Westow Park, a smaller park that lies off the triangle southwest of Crystal Palace Park; and the Stambourne Woodland Walk.

Crystal Palace was named in the Sunday Times newspaper's top ten list of "the best places to live in London" of 2016. In April 2022 Crystal Palace was named the best place to live in London by the Sunday Times, being characterised by a bohemian fusion of urban vibes and village-feel.

== History ==
The ridge and the historic oak tree known as the Vicar's Oak (at the crossroads of the A212 Church Road and A214 Westow Hill) were used to mark parish boundaries. This has led to the Crystal Palace area straddling the boundaries of five London Boroughs; Bromley, Croydon, Lambeth, Southwark and Lewisham. The area also straddles three postcode districts: SE19, SE20, and SE26. The ancient boundary between Surrey and Kent passes through the area, and until 1889 included parts of both counties. From 1889 to 1965 the area was on the south-eastern boundary of the County of London.

For centuries the area was covered by the Great North Wood, an extensive area of natural oak forest that formed a wilderness close to the southern edge of the then expanding city of London. The forest was a popular area for Londoners' recreation right up to the 19th century, when it began to be built over. It also became a home for some Romani people, with local street names and pubs recording the link, and the area still retains vestiges of woodland.

A pneumatic railway was briefly trialled in the area in 1864. Once the railways arrived, Crystal Palace was eventually served by two railway stations, the high level and low level stations, built to handle the large volume of passengers visiting the exhibition building. After the Palace was destroyed by fire, and with railway travel declining, passenger numbers fell and the high level station was closed in 1954 and demolished seven years later. Rail services gradually declined, and for a period in the 1960s and 1970s, there were plans to construct an urban motorway through the area as part of the London Ringways plan. With rising passenger numbers, additional London Overground services began stopping at the station and a major station redevelopment occurred.

=== The Crystal Palace ===
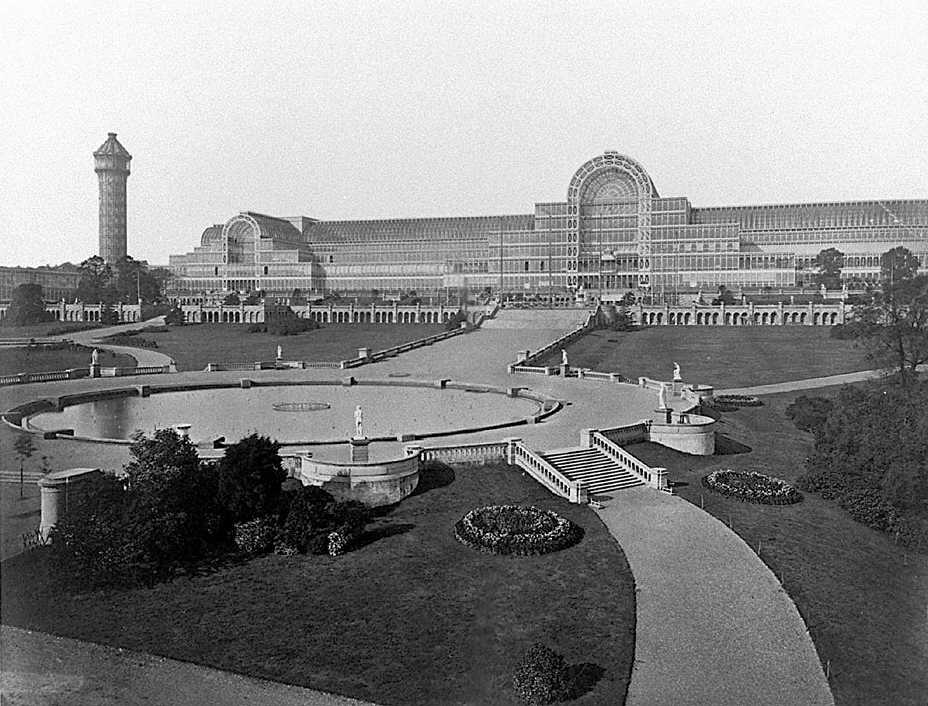
The Crystal Palace

The Crystal Palace, designed by Joseph Paxton, was a remarkable construction of prefabricated parts. It was a cast-iron and glass building originally erected in Hyde Park to house the Great Exhibition of 1851. Following the success of the exhibition, the Palace was moved and reconstructed in 1854 in a modified and enlarged form in the grounds of the Penge Place estate at Sydenham Hill. The buildings housed the Crystal Palace School of Art, Science, and Literature and Crystal Palace School of Engineering. It attracted visitors for over seven decades.

Sydenham Hill is one of the highest locations in London; 109 metres (357 ft) above sea level (spot height on Ordnance Survey Map); and the size of the Palace and prominence of the site made it easy to identify from much of London. This led to the residential area around the building becoming known as Crystal Palace instead of Sydenham Hill. The Palace was destroyed by fire on 30 November 1936 and the site of the building and its grounds is now known as Crystal Palace Park.

== Landmarks ==
=== Crystal Palace Triangle ===
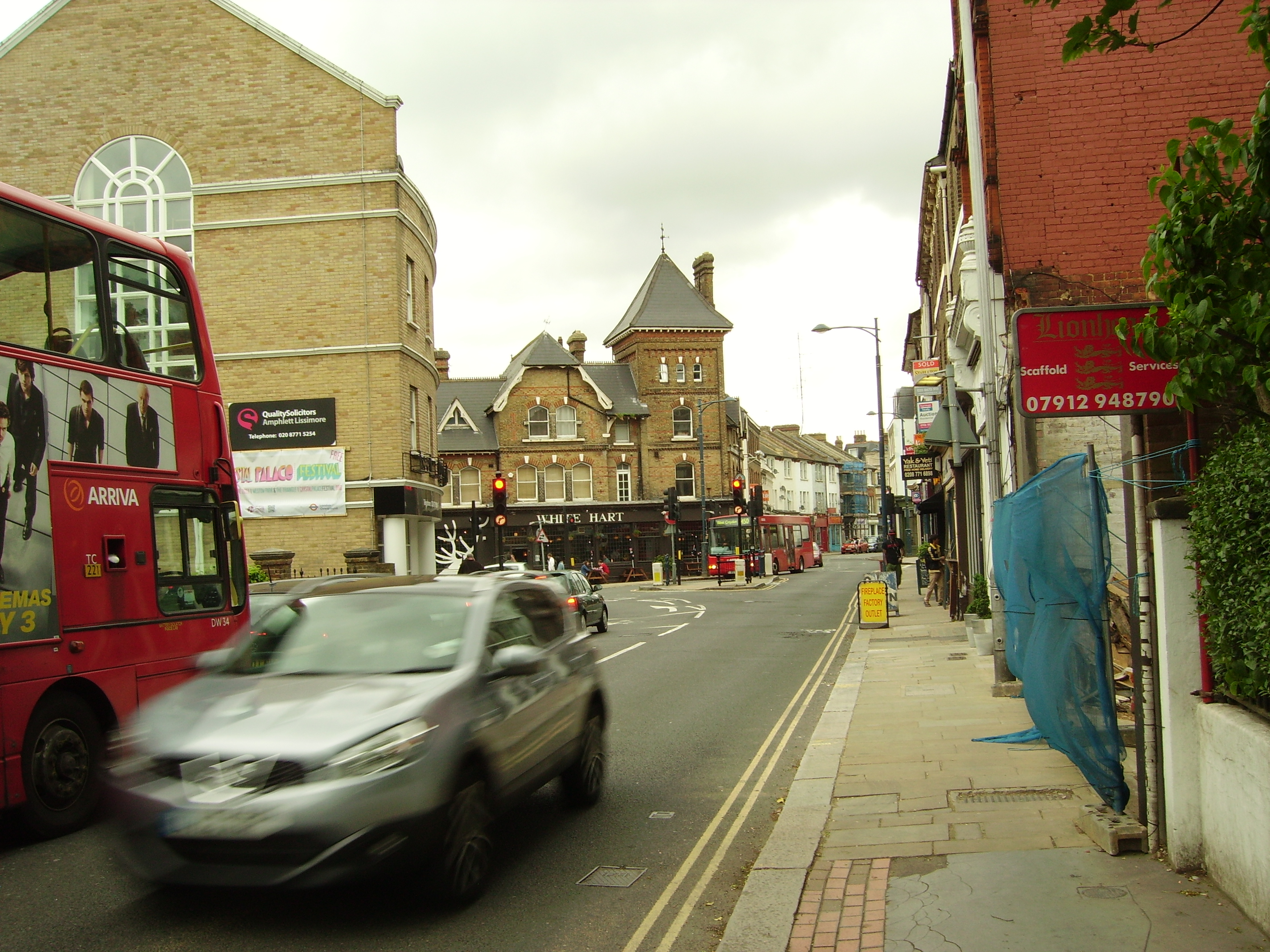
View into the Crystal Palace Triangle from Church Road

The area is formed by Westow Street, Westow Hill and Church Road, and has a number of restaurants and several independent shops, as well as an indoor secondhand market and a farmer's market on Haynes Lane. The triangle also contains a range of vintage furniture and clothing stores, as well as galleries, arts and crafts shops and other businesses. There was an ongoing campaign to turn a former bingo hall (at 25 Church Road) back into a cinema, after it had been purchased by the Kingsway International Christian Centre. The cinema had opened as "The Rialto" in 1928, later being renamed "The Picture Palace", only to close in 1968 and become a bingo hall. In 2018 after considerable restoration and renovation, Everyman Cinemas re-opened 25 Church Road as their 25th nationwide cinema location.

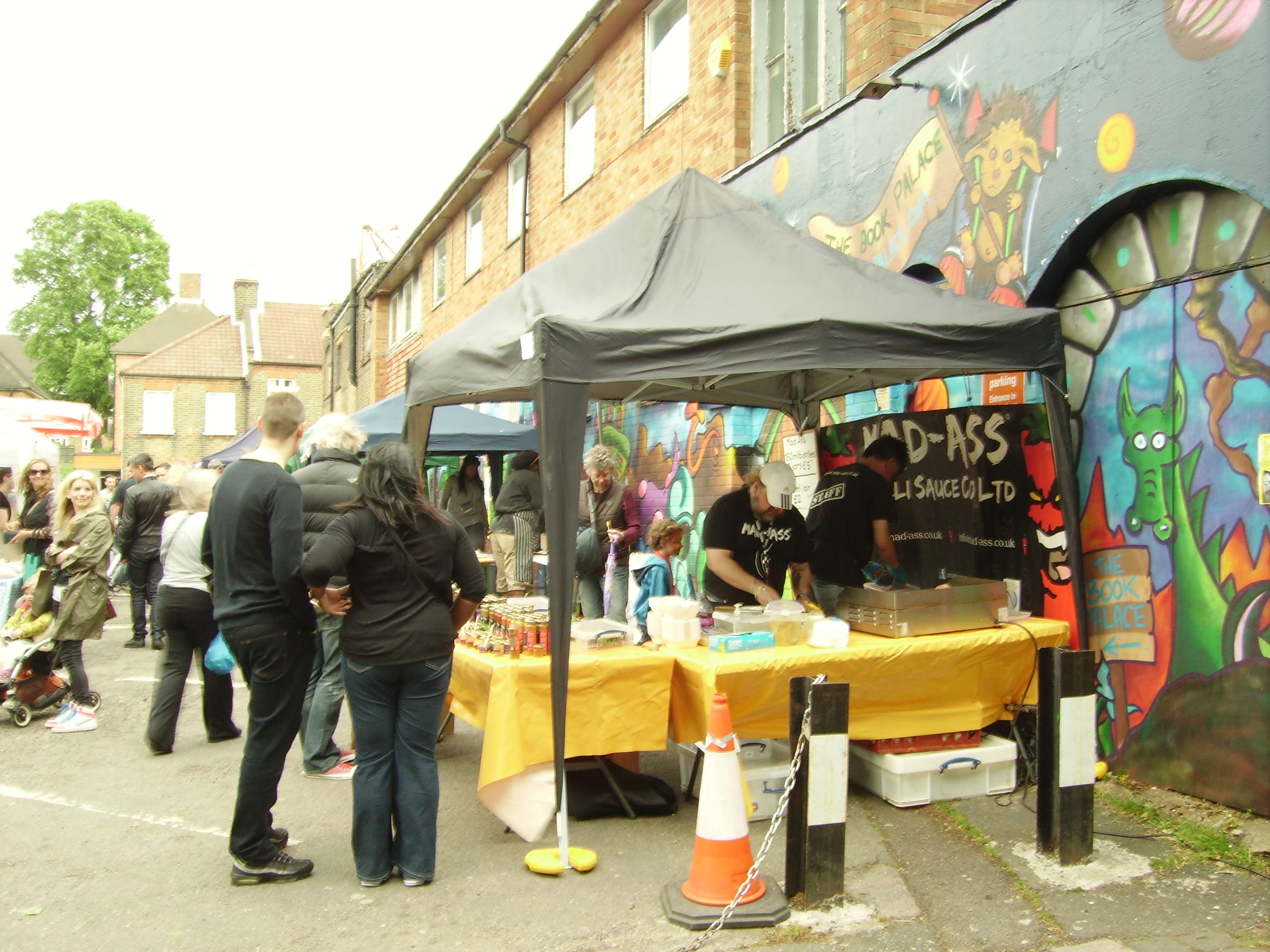
Haynes Lane Farmer's Market

=== Transmitters ===
Television transmission has been taking place from Crystal Palace since at least the 1930s and two TV transmitter towers — Crystal Palace Transmitter – 640 feet (200 m) tall — and Croydon Transmitter – 500 feet (150 m) tall — stand on the hill at Upper Norwood, making the district a landmark location visible from many parts of London. The towers may appear similar in height and design, but the Crystal Palace mast, constructed in 1956, is on a slightly higher elevation. The current Croydon tower was built in 1962.

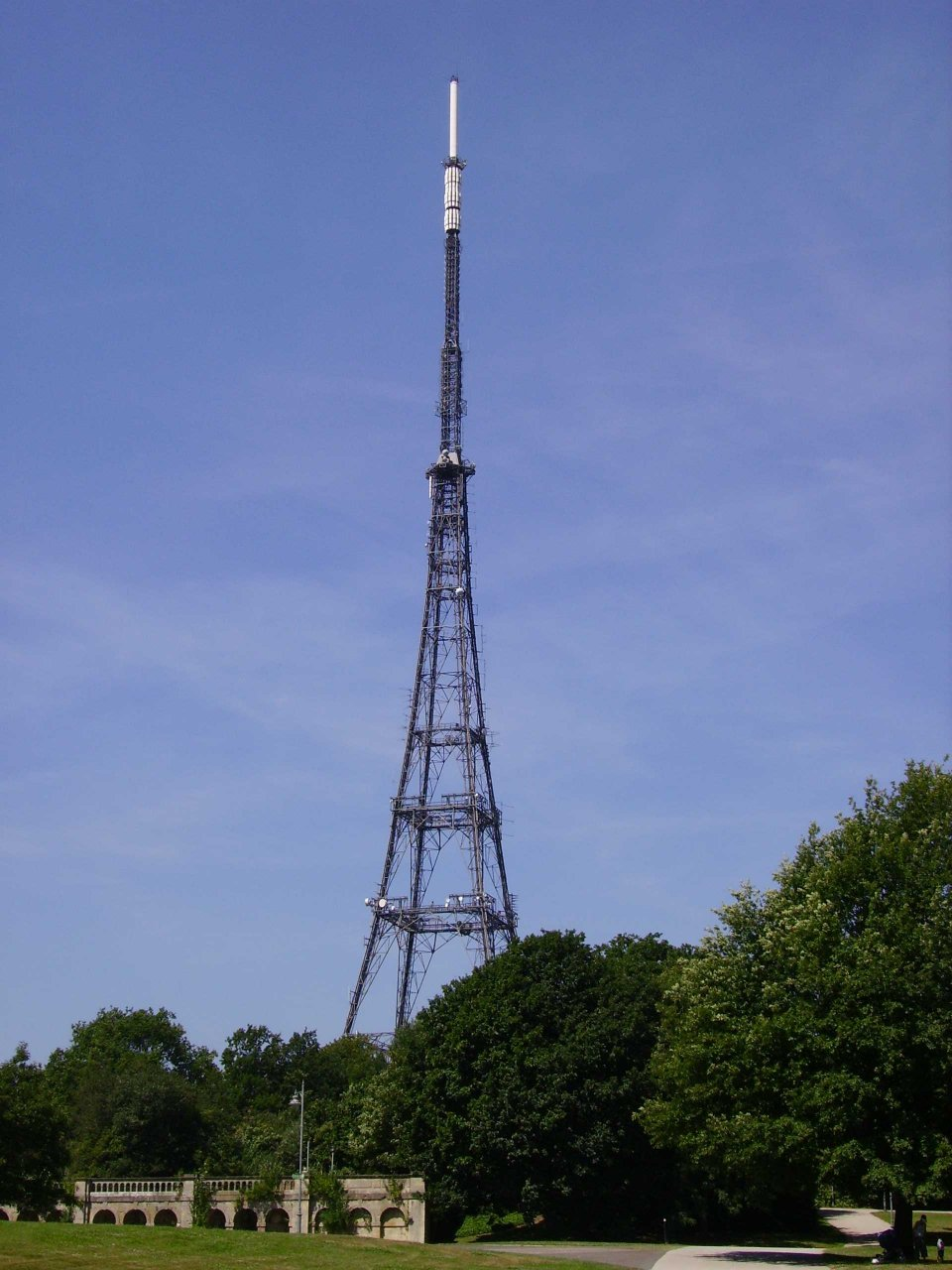
The Crystal Palace Transmitter, at 219 metres tall, is the fourth tallest structure in London, behind the Shard, One Canada Square and Heron Tower.

=== Crystal Palace Park ===
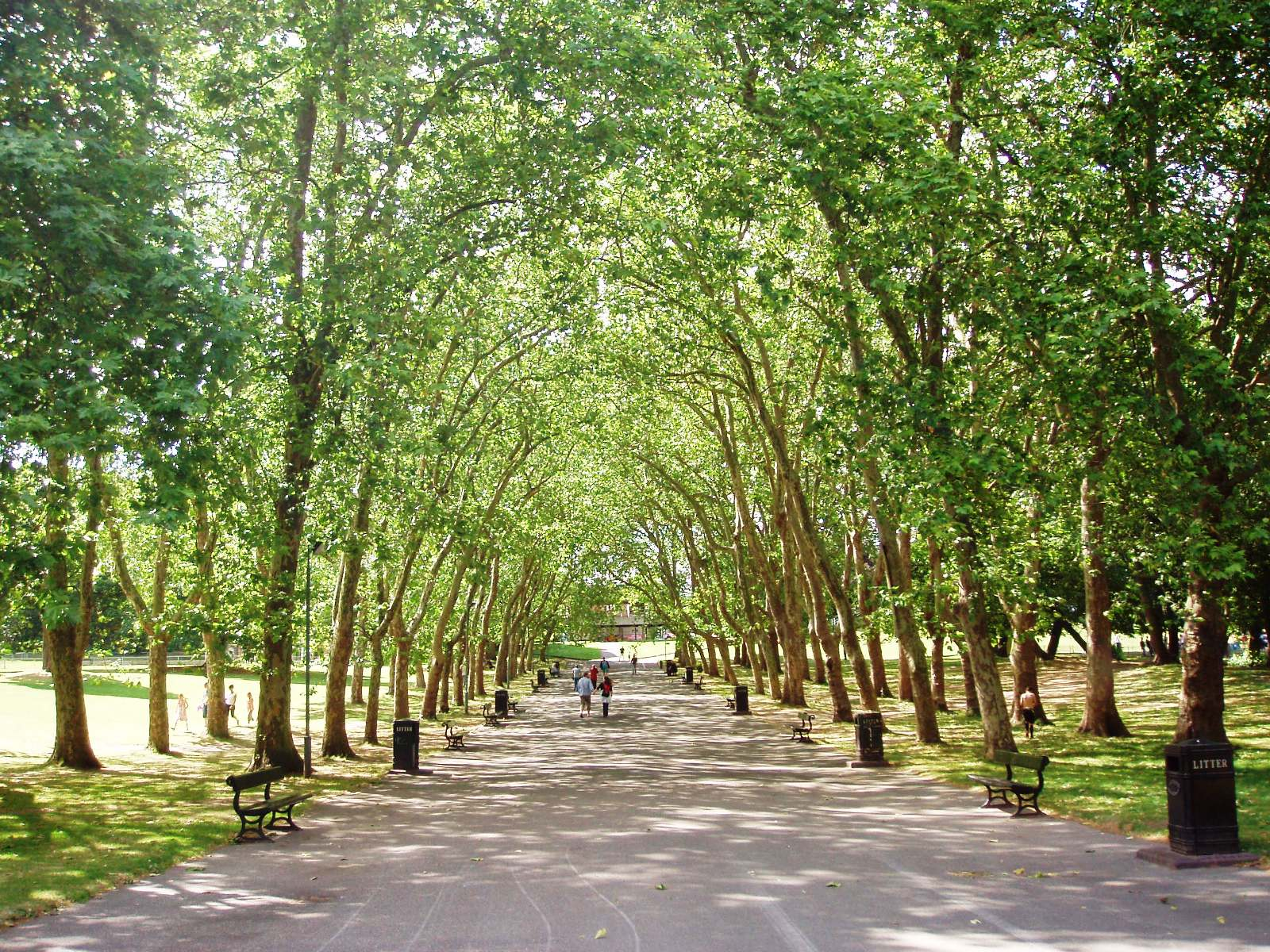
Crystal Palace Park

Crystal Palace Park is a large Victorian pleasure ground occupying much of the land within Crystal Palace and is one of the major London public parks. The park was maintained by the LCC and later the GLC, but with the abolition of the GLC in 1986, control of the entire park was given to the London Borough of Bromley. From 15 September 2023 responsibility for the park's management has been handed to the Crystal Palace Park Trust. Crystal Palace railway station is located by the park, as is the National Sports Centre. The park was formerly used for sports such as cricket, football and motor racing, and has been a venue for concerts often performed at the site of the Crystal Palace Park Concert Platform. In recent years the park has played host to organised music events such as Wireless Festival and South Facing Festival. It is also home to the famous Crystal Palace Dinosaur sculptures.

The park is situated halfway along Norwood Ridge at one of its highest points. This ridge offers views northwards to central London, east to the Queen Elizabeth II Bridge and Greenwich, and southward to Croydon and the North Downs. It is also one of the starting points for the Green Chain Walk, linking to places such as Chislehurst, Erith, the Thames Barrier and Thamesmead. Section 3 of the Capital Ring walk round London goes through the park.

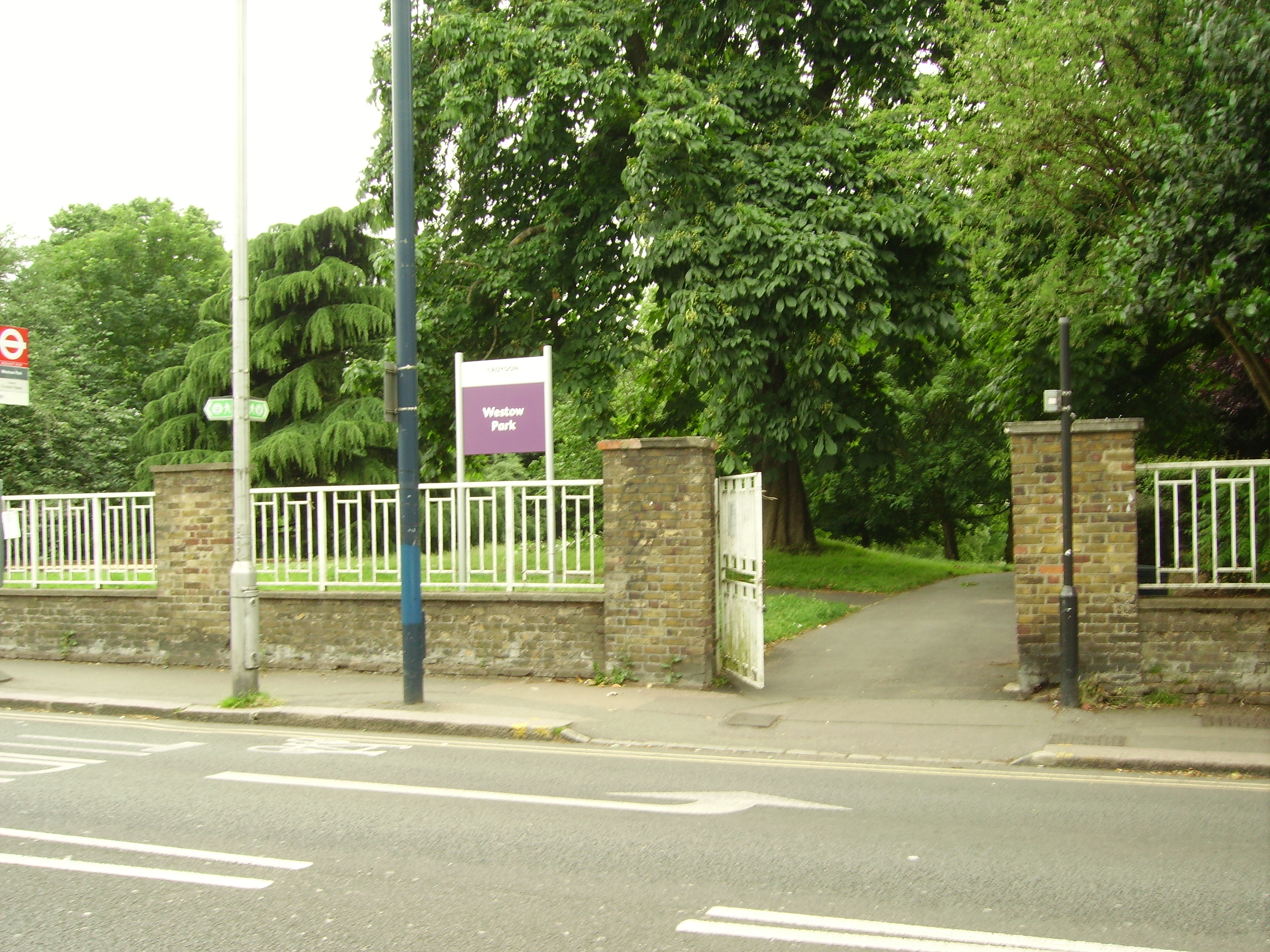
Entrance to Westow Park, Crystal Palace.

=== Westow Park ===
A smaller park occupying 2.73 hectares (6.7 acres) is to the southwest of the triangle on Church Road. Westow Park hosts the annual Crystal Palace Overground festival, a free community festival held over four days in the summer.

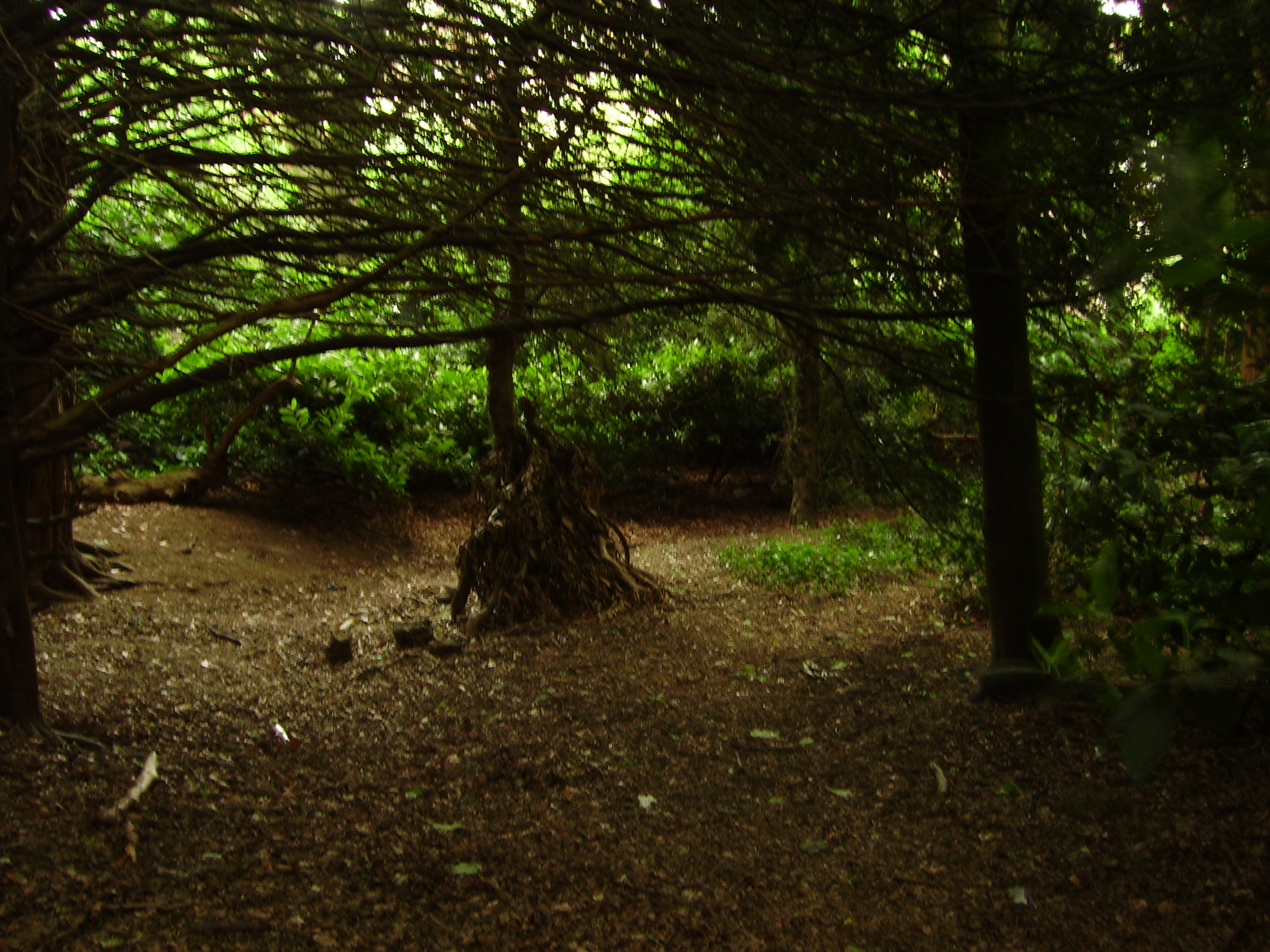
View of Stambourne Woodland Walk.

=== Stambourne Woods ===
To the south of the triangle is a small area of woodland occupying 1.92 hectares (4.7 acres), containing the Stambourne Woodland Walk. It was opened in 1984 and covers an area between developments on Stambourne Way and Fox Hill. The land originally formed the gardens of Victorian villas built on the hill overlooking Croydon, but fell into disrepair. In 1962, the Croydon Council approved terms for buying the land from the Church Commissioners and other local freeholders, allowing the construction of a link. Paths and benches were installed but much of the vegetation was left undisturbed, creating a woodland pathway.

=== Saint Constantine and Helen Greek Orthodox Church ===
At 69 Westow Street is an ornate Greek Orthodox Church which serves the Greek Cypriot and Orthodox community in the surrounding area. Built in 1878, and formerly an Anglican church (St. Andrew's), the walls are now dressed in ornate Byzantine-style art.

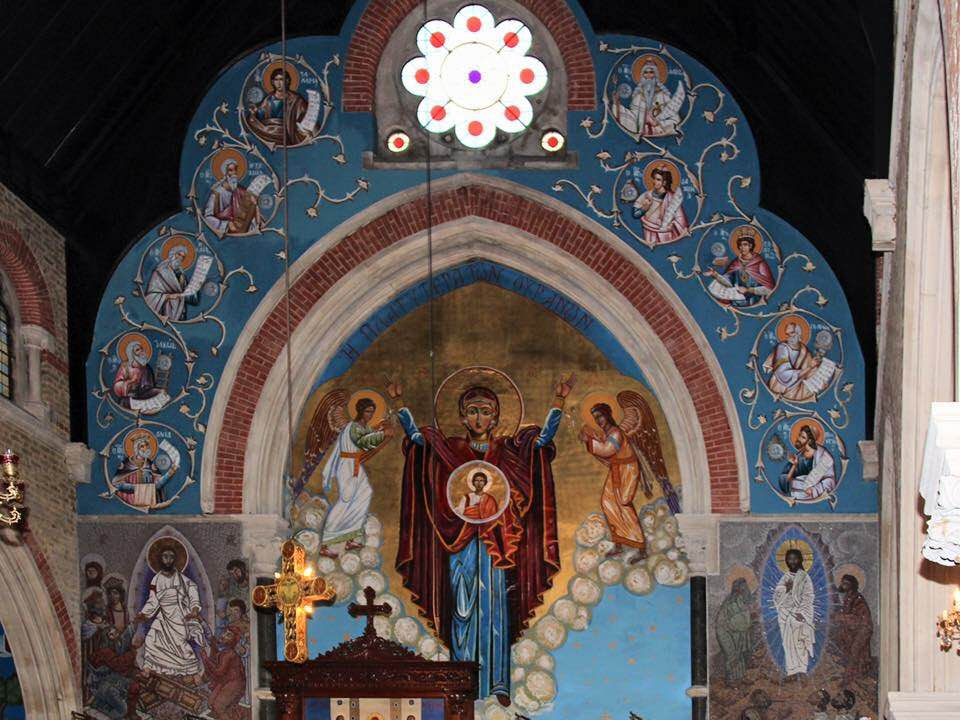
Greek Orthodox Church of Saint Constantine and Helen, SE19

== Geography ==
Crystal Palace is about 7 miles (11 km) southeast of Charing Cross on Norwood Ridge and includes one of the highest points of London at 112 metres above the mean sea level (OS map reference TQ337707). The Crystal Palace National Sports Centre, in the centre of the park, is 88 metres (289 ft) above the mean sea level. The soil in the area has been classified as typically "Slowly permeable, seasonally wet, slightly acid but base-rich loamy and clayey soils", with impeded drainage, moderate fertility and a loamy profile. The nearest Met Office climate station is based in Greenwich Park.

Climate data for London (Greenwich)
Month	Jan	Feb	Mar	Apr	May	Jun	Jul	Aug	Sep	Oct	Nov	Dec	Year
Record high °C (°F)	18.5 (65.3)	19.7 (67.5)	25.3 (77.5)	29.8 (85.6)	32.8 (91.0)	35.6 (96.1)	36.5 (97.7)	38.5 (101.3)	35.4 (95.7)	29.9 (85.8)	21.1 (70.0)	17.7 (63.9)	38.5 (101.3)
Mean daily maximum °C (°F)	8.3 (46.9)	8.5 (47.3)	11.4 (52.5)	14.2 (57.6)	17.7 (63.9)	20.7 (69.3)	23.2 (73.8)	22.9 (73.2)	20.1 (68.2)	15.6 (60.1)	11.4 (52.5)	8.6 (47.5)	15.2 (59.4)
Mean daily minimum °C (°F)	2.6 (36.7)	2.4 (36.3)	4.1 (39.4)	5.4 (41.7)	8.4 (47.1)	11.5 (52.7)	13.9 (57.0)	13.7 (56.7)	11.2 (52.2)	8.3 (46.9)	5.1 (41.2)	2.8 (37.0)	7.5 (45.5)
Record low °C (°F)	−10.0 (14.0)	−9.0 (15.8)	−8.0 (17.6)	−2.0 (28.4)	−1.0 (30.2)	5.0 (41.0)	7.0 (44.6)	6.0 (42.8)	3.0 (37.4)	−4.0 (24.8)	−5.0 (23.0)	−7.0 (19.4)	−10.0 (14.0)
Average precipitation mm (inches)	51.6 (2.03)	38.2 (1.50)	40.5 (1.59)	45.0 (1.77)	46.5 (1.83)	47.3 (1.86)	41.1 (1.62)	51.6 (2.03)	50.4 (1.98)	68.8 (2.71)	58.0 (2.28)	53.0 (2.09)	591.8 (23.30)
Average rainy days (≥ 1.0 mm)	10.8	8.5	9.6	9.4	9.0	8.3	8.0	7.6	8.5	10.7	10.1	9.9	110.4
Average snowy days	4	4	3	1	0	0	0	0	0	0	1	3	16
Average relative humidity (%)	91	89	91	90	92	92	93	95	96	95	93	91	92
Mean monthly sunshine hours	49.9	71.4	107.1	159.8	181.2	181.0	192.1	195.1	138.9	108.1	58.5	37.4	1,480.5
Source 1: Record highs and lows from BBC Weather, except August and February maximum from Met Office
Source 2: All other data from Met Office, except for humidity and snow data which are from NOAA

== Local government ==
Crystal Palace is on the boundary of four London boroughs – Bromley, Croydon, Lambeth and Southwark. A fifth borough – Lewisham – is nearby. As a result, the area is served by a diverse range of local government bodies and Members of Parliament (MPs).

Party colours
Colour	Party
	Conservative
	Labour
	Liberal Democrats

=== Local authorities ===
Several local authority councillors in the area were elected on 5 May 2022. All seats bar 1 are held by Labour party candidates. The elected officials by ward for Crystal Palace local authorities in October 2023 were:

Local Authority	Ward	Elected Councillors
Bromley	Crystal Palace & Anerley	Ruth McGregor
Bromley	Crystal Palace & Anerley	Ryan Thomson
Croydon	Crystal Palace and Upper Norwood	Claire Bonham
Croydon	Crystal Palace and Upper Norwood	Nina Degrads
Croydon	Crystal Palace and Upper Norwood	Patsy Cummings
Lambeth	Gipsy Hill	Christine Banton
Lambeth	Gipsy Hill	Rebecca Spencer
Southwark	Dulwich Wood	Andy Simmons
Southwark	Dulwich Wood	Catherine Rose
Lewisham	Sydenham	Chris Best
Lewisham	Sydenham	Liam Curran
Lewisham	Sydenham	Jack Lavery

=== London Assembly ===
The area is represented by four constituencies in the London Assembly. Their elected assembly members in 2024 were:

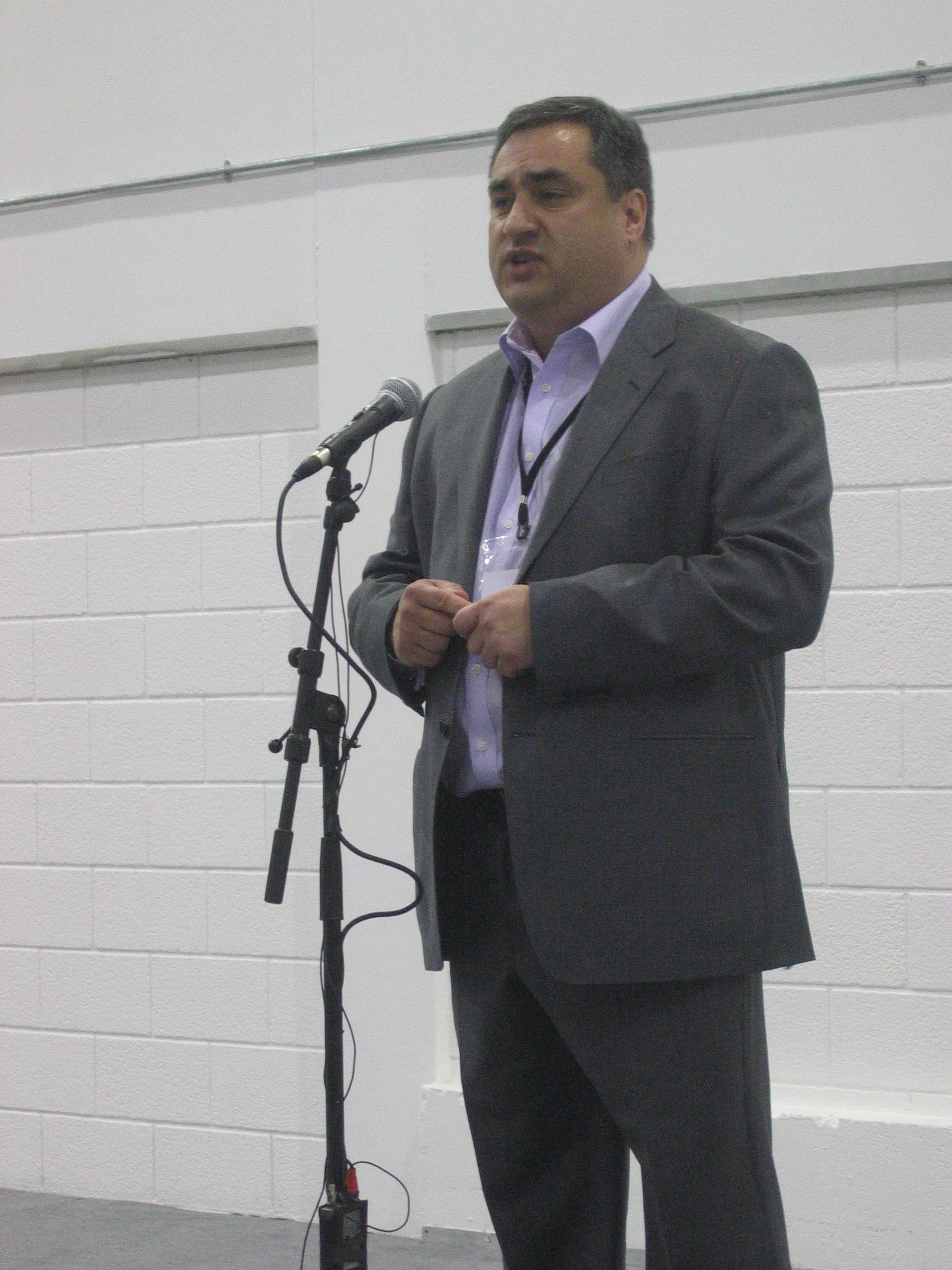
Len Duvall

London Assembly Members in Crystal Palace.

London Assembly Constituency	Elected Member
Croydon and Sutton	Neil Garratt
Bexley and Bromley	Thomas Turrell
Greenwich and Lewisham	Len Duvall
Lambeth and Southwark	Marina Ahmad

=== Westminster Parliament ===
The area is represented by four constituencies in the Westminster Parliament. In July 2024, their elected MPs were:

Constituency	MP
Beckenham and Penge	Liam Conlon
Croydon North	Steve Reed
Dulwich and West Norwood	Helen Hayes
Lewisham West and East Dulwich	Ellie Reeves

== Media ==
=== Films ===
The Italian Job has a scene filmed at the athletics track in the Crystal Palace sports centre, in which Michael Caine says, "You were only supposed to blow the bloody doors off!" The Pleasure Garden was also filmed in the park and Our Mother's House has a scene featuring Dirk Bogarde with several children on the park's boating lake.

The park features prominently as the setting of an outdoor rave in the music video for The Chemical Brothers' number 1 single "Setting Sun".

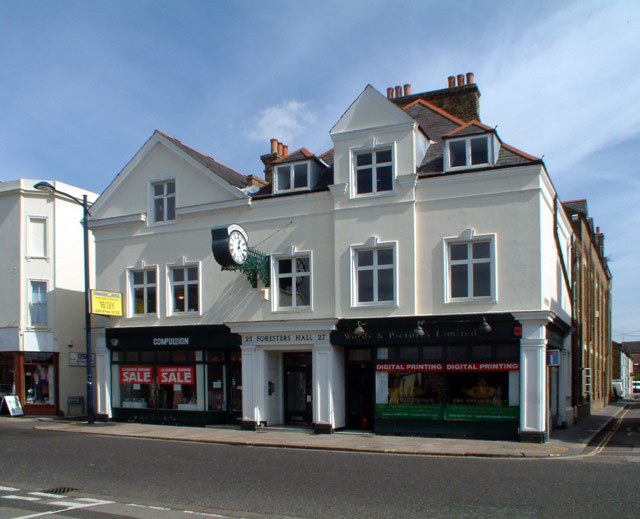
Foresters Hall, Westow Street

=== Literature ===
Arthur Conan Doyle was active in the area between 1891 and 1894. Although he lived in nearby South Norwood, he visited the Crystal Palace and Upper Norwood area regularly in connection with the Upper Norwood Literary and Scientific Society. The Foresters Hall on Westow Street was then known as the Welcome Hall (or just Welcome), and it was in that hall in May 1892 that Arthur Conan Doyle was elected President of the society. He was re-elected to the post in 1893 and resigned in 1894. Each occasion was held in the same hall.

The writer Deborah Crombie sets her 2013 mystery, The Sound of Broken Glass, in the Crystal Palace area of London.

== Sports ==
=== Cricket ===
The Crystal Palace Cricket Club was founded in 1857 and played their matches inside the grounds of The Crystal Palace at the Crystal Palace Park Cricket Ground, which later became the home of the London County Cricket Club formed by the Crystal Palace Company with the help of W.G. Grace.

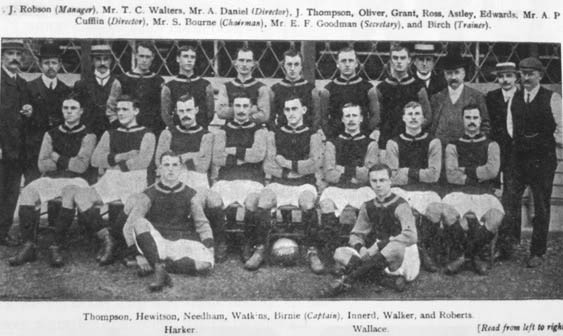
Crystal Palace FC 1905–06

=== Football ===
An amateur football team formed of players from the Crystal Palace Cricket Club played on the cricket ground between 1862 and 1864. They moved to a ground behind the Crooked Billet, Penge for a few years, but then came back to Crystal Palace Park for a short spell before disbanding around 1876. The professional Crystal Palace football club was founded in 1905 and played its home games at the sports stadium situated in Crystal Palace Park, which was built in 1895 to host the FA Cup Final. However, in 1915 the club was forced to leave due to the First World War and played at nearby Herne Hill Velodrome and the Nest, before moving to its current home at Selhurst Park in 1924. The club competes in the Premier League, the top–tier of English football.

=== FA Cup Final ===
The FA Cup Final was hosted at the Palace sports stadium between 1895 and 1914.

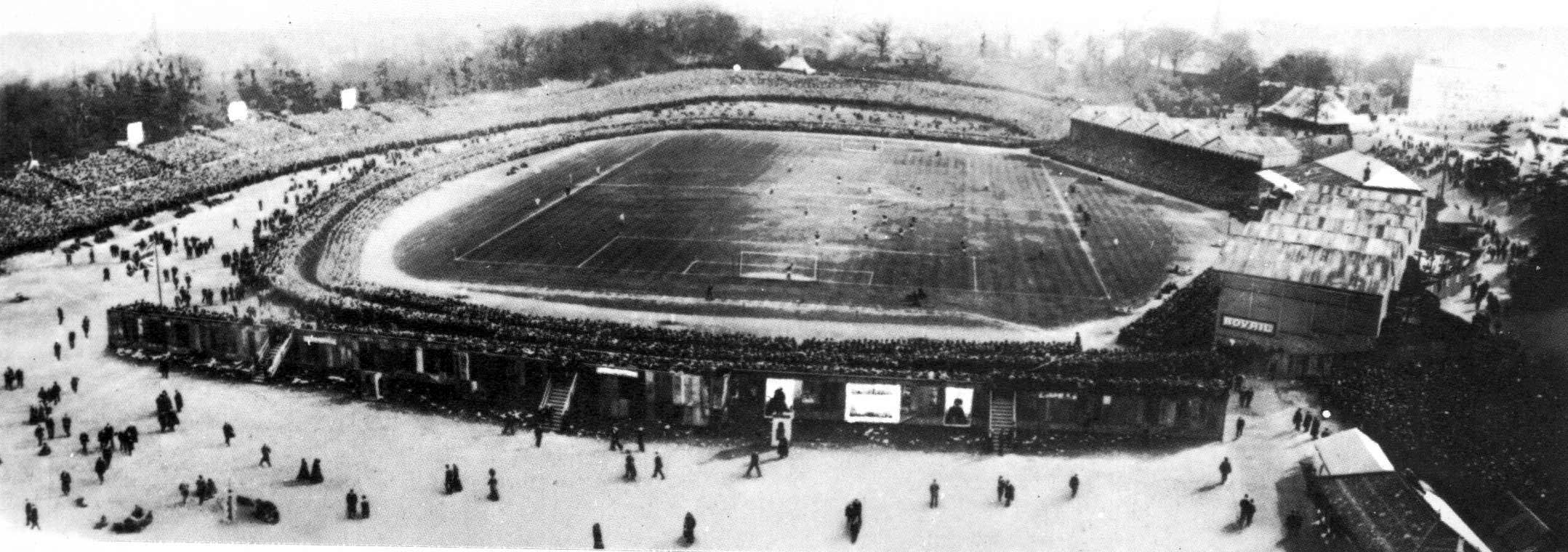
A panoramic view of the Crystal Palace ground during the 1905 FA Cup Final, the only such photograph of the stadium known to exist.

=== Rugby ===
The historical grounds also hosted the first England Rugby Union match against New Zealand in 1905, which New Zealand won by 15–0.

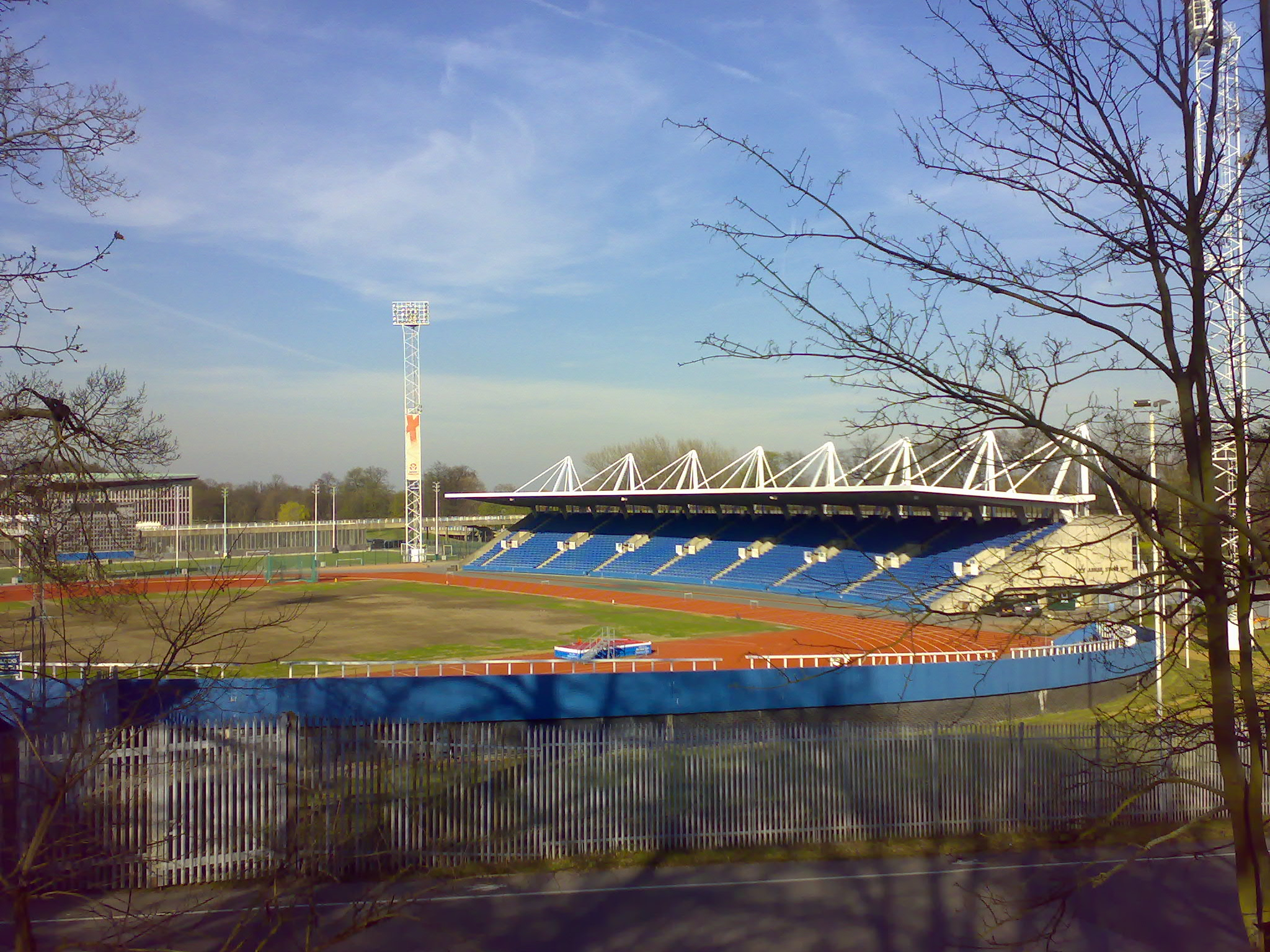
Athletics stadium at the National Sports Centre.

=== National Sports Centre ===
In 1964, a 15,500 seater athletics stadium and sports centre was built on the former site of the football stadium in Crystal Palace Park. The athletics stadium was known as the National Sports Centre and between 1999 and 2012 hosted the London Athletics Grand Prix among other international athletics meetings. The Crystal Palace triathletes club is also based here. Since the London 2012 Olympics, the status of the stadium and aquatics centre as the main facilities for their sports in London has been superseded by the London Aquatics Centre and Olympic Stadium. This led to Crystal Palace F.C. submitting plans to rebuild the stadium as a 40,000 capacity football venue, although the club has since shelved these plans, to concentrate on redeveloping their home at Selhurst Park.

=== Motor Racing ===
A motor racing circuit was opened around the Park in 1927 and the remains of the track now make up some of the access roads around the park. The track was extended to two miles (3.2 km) in 1936, before being taken over by the Ministry of Defence at the start of World War II. Race meetings resumed in 1953, and the circuit hosted a range of international racing events, continuing until the last races in 1974. For three years, from 1997, parts of the circuit were used for a once-a-year sprint time trial similar to a hillclimb before stopping due to development work. The event resumed in 2010 and continued until 2019.

== Education ==
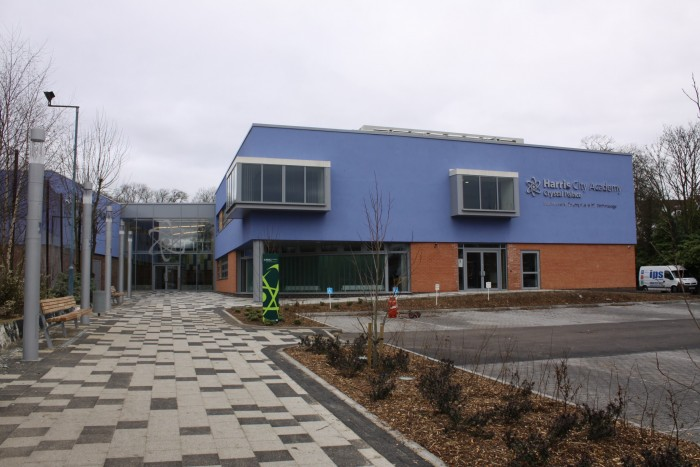
Harris City Academy Crystal Palace

Crystal Palace contains three primary schools, Paxton Primary School, Rockmount Primary School and All Saints C of E Primary School, and one secondary school, Harris City Academy. Crystal Palace Park also contains a branch of Capel Manor College, offering courses in Animal Care, Arboriculture and Countryside, Horticulture and Landscaping and Garden Design along with other short courses.

In 2013, due to a shortage of primary school places in both Crystal Palace and London, proposals to open a new primary school by September 2015 were put forward, with plans submitted to the Department for Education in January 2014. The proposals were approved as part of wave 6 of the Free Schools Programme and the school is scheduled to open in September 2015. As of October 2014, the school is considering three possible building configurations – with the Greater London Authority running a public consultation on each option – all of which would involve demolishing one of the seated stands around the athletics track at the National Sports Centre.

== Transport ==
=== Roads ===
The area is served by the A212, A214, A234 and A2199 roads. The roads that make up the triangle (Westow Hill, Westow Street and Church Road) form part of a one-way system and are in a 24-hour controlled parking and loading zone. There is a coach park inside Crystal Palace Park.

The area would have been affected by the cancelled London Ringways motorway plans, as one of the radial routes connecting the South Cross Route to Ringway 2 (the South Cross Route to Parkway D Radial) would have run through a part of Crystal Palace Park, following the railway line.

==== Cycle routes ====
London Cycle Network routes 23 and 27 travel through Crystal Palace. Route 27 runs from Anerley Hill through part of Crystal Palace Park towards Bromley and route 23 runs through the Crystal Palace triangle to connect to Borough and Croydon.

Transport for London have proposed to build Quietway route 7 that runs from Crystal Palace to Elephant and Castle. The route was subject to consultation processes in the London Boroughs of Lambeth and Southwark in 2016, with construction to begin in 2017.

=== Rail ===
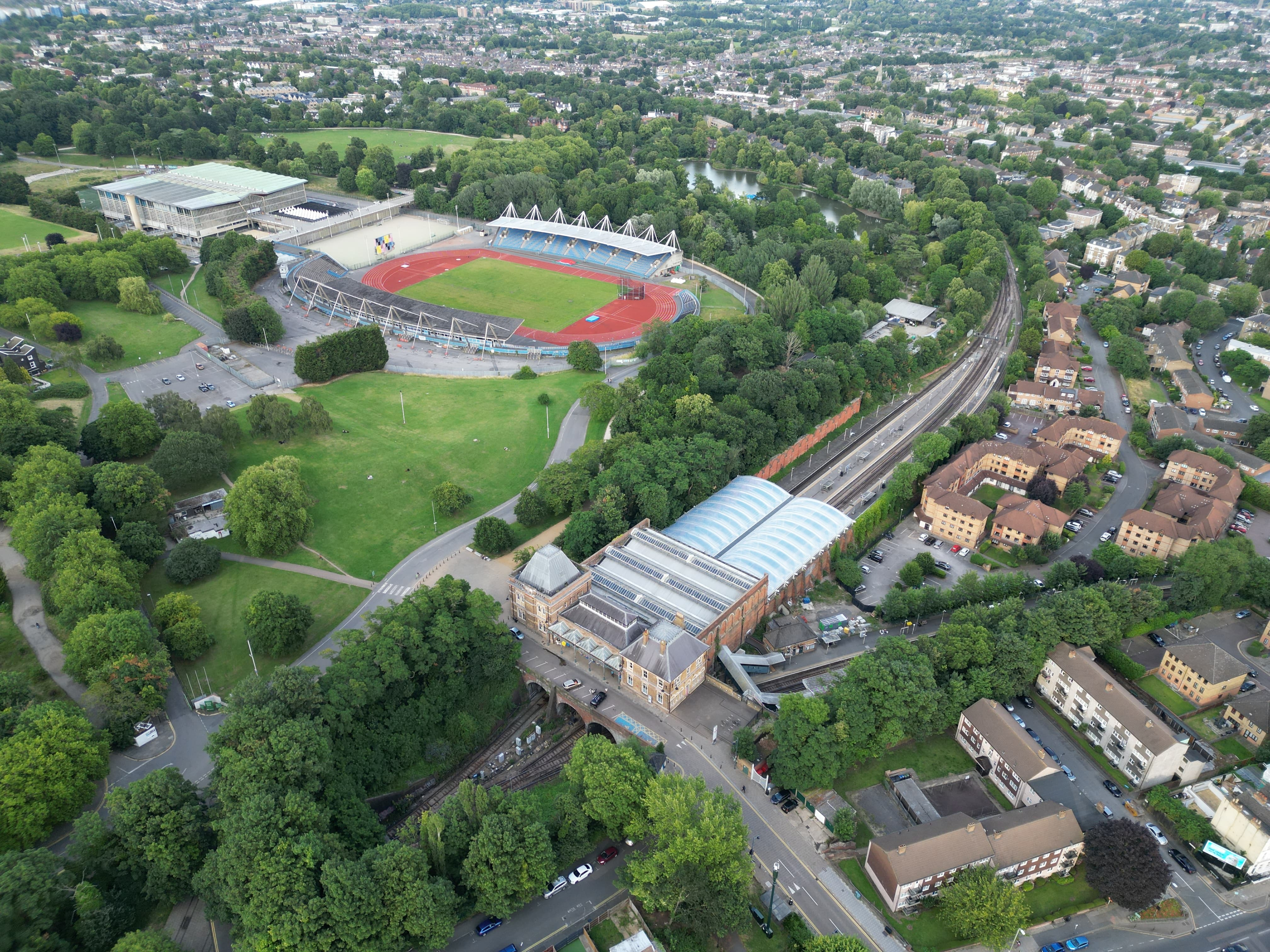
Crystal Palace Station, aerial view in 2024.

Crystal Palace is accessible by rail from Crystal Palace railway station, where Southern trains run between Victoria on the Crystal Palace Line and London Bridge on the Brighton Main Line, and where London Overground trains on the Windrush line run to Highbury & Islington, serving as one of the two southern terminus for the line. In addition, Southern services run to Beckenham Junction, Sutton and Epsom Downs. Crystal Palace railway station is one of the few stations to border two zones, Zones 3 and 4. The South Gate of the Park is accessible by rail via Penge West, which is served by Southern trains from London Bridge and Windrush line services.

Crystal Palace used to have a second railway station, the Crystal Palace (High Level) railway station. The station was built to serve passengers visiting the Crystal Palace, but after the fire in 1936, traffic on the branch line declined. In World War II, the line serving the station was temporarily closed due to bomb damage. Repairs were made and the line was reopened, but the requirement for reconstruction and the decline in traffic led to a decision to close the station and branch line in 1954, followed by the demolition of the station in 1961. Despite the demolition, a Grade II listed subway remains under Crystal Palace Parade. The Crystal Palace pneumatic railway was also built in Crystal Palace c.1864.

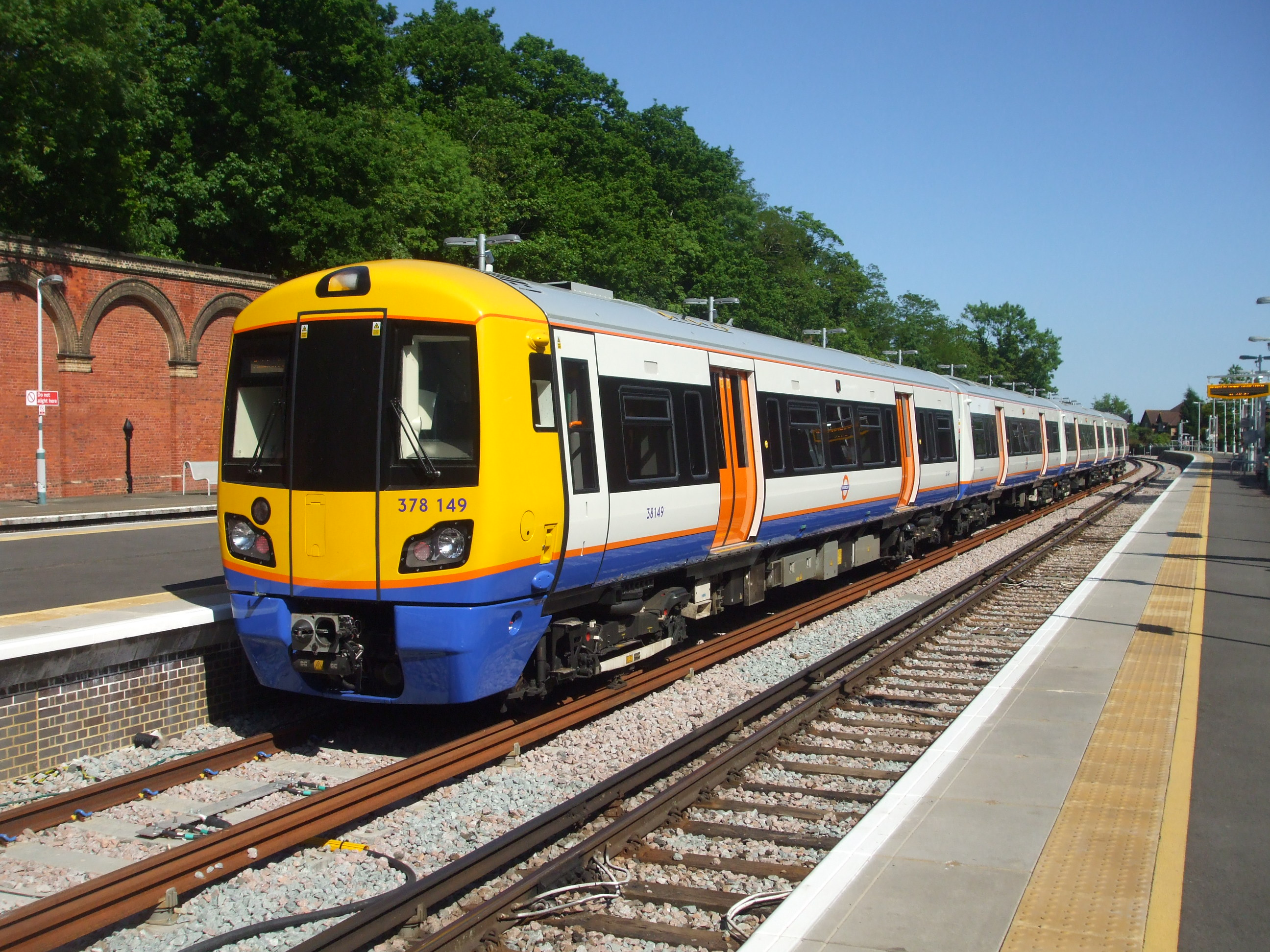
London Overground train at Crystal Palace.

The low level station remain open, although passenger numbers at that station also fell after the fire of 1936 and many services were diverted to serve London–Croydon routes instead of the Victoria–London Bridge route. Rail travel was in decline across the UK in the 1960s and 1970s when the Beeching Axe was imposed. In the 1970s, two outer platforms used by terminating trains were abandoned and the third rail was removed.

More recently rail travel at the station has seen a resurgence and new services have started running. Passenger numbers increased each year between 2004 and 2013. Since May 2010, the station has served the East London Line branch of the London Overground, connecting with the Central London and East End of London. In 2011 services were extended to Highbury and Islington. The station underwent redevelopment in 2012, which brought the original Victorian booking hall back into use, created a new cafe in the station building and provided wheelchair access through the installation of three lifts; this work was completed by the end of March 2013.

=== Tram ===
Tram services from Surrey used to operate up Anerley Hill to the Crystal Palace Parade until the 1930s. More recently there have been proposals to connect Tramlink to Crystal Palace, with mayoral candidates citing the desirability of the initiative.

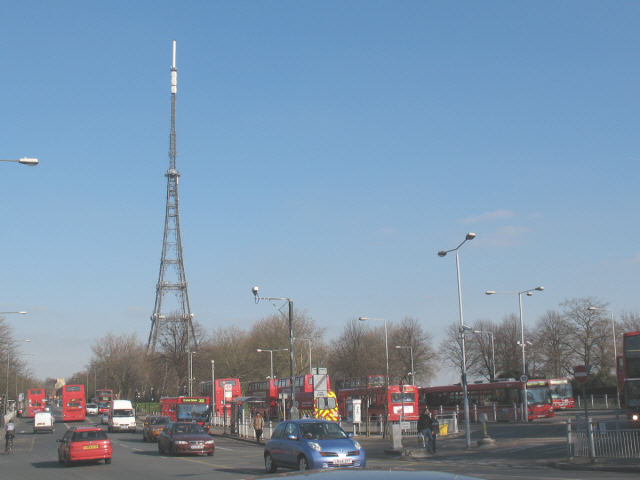
Crystal Palace Bus Station

=== Bus ===
The area is served by multiple bus routes, many of which terminate at Crystal Palace Bus Station situated on the Parade. These services include routes N2, 3/N3, N63, 122, N137, 157, 202, 227, 249, 322, 358, 363, 410, 417, 432 and 450.

=== Air ===
The nearest major international airports are Heathrow and Gatwick. London City Airport and Biggin Hill Airport are also nearby.

== Notable people ==
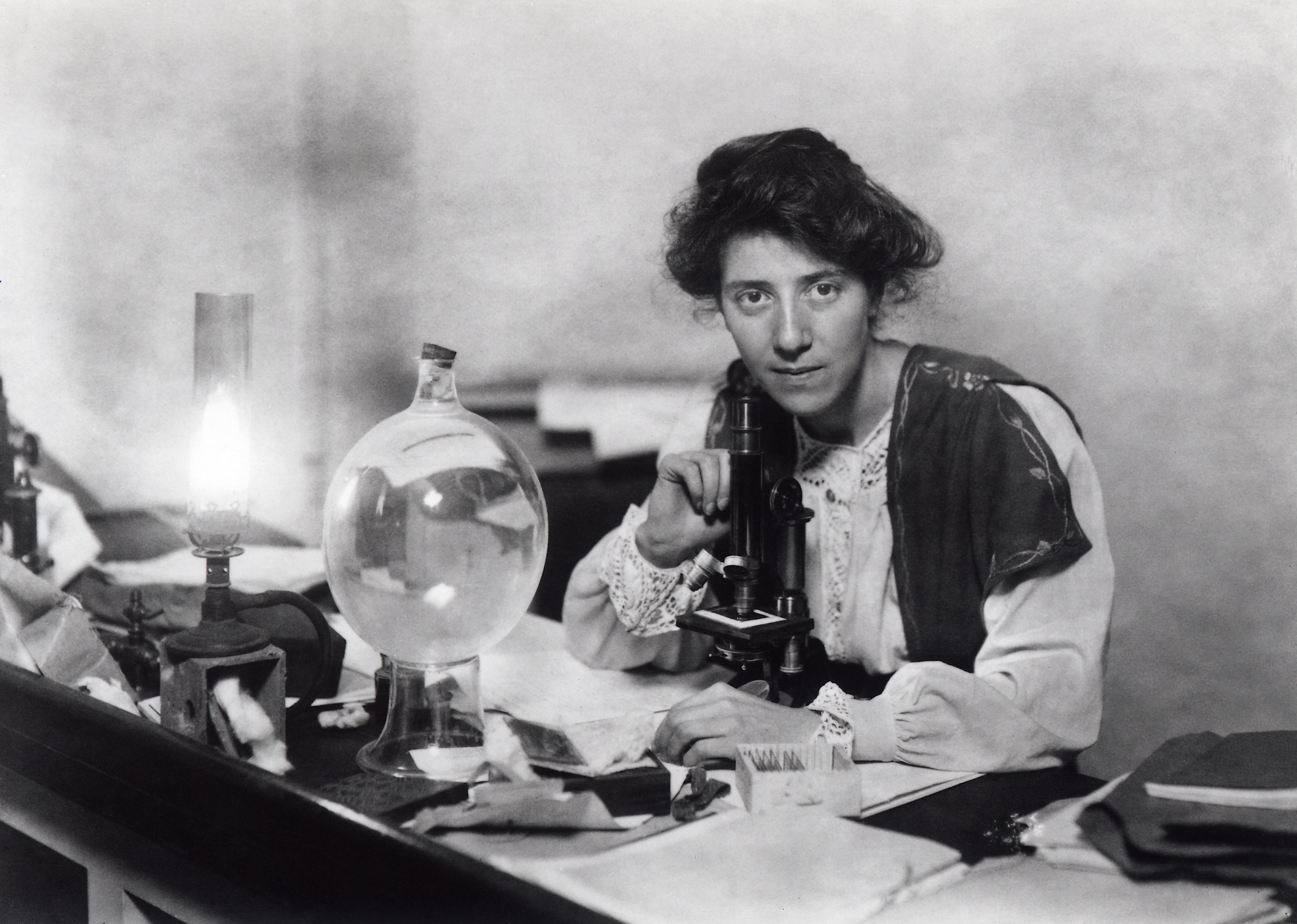
Marie Stopes in her laboratory, 1904.

Marie Stopes, early promoter of sex education and contraception, was raised in a house on Cintra Park shortly after her birth in Edinburgh in 1880.

Joseph Paxton, designer of the Crystal Palace itself and instrumental in having the building reassembled on Sydenham Hill following the success of the Great Exhibition of 1851, lived in a house called "Rockhills" at the top of Westwood Hill.

Benjamin Waterhouse Hawkins, artist and sculptor who created the Crystal Palace Dinosaurs in the park, lived in Belvedere Road between 1856 and 1872.

Jim Bob, Carter USM frontman, currently lives in Crystal Palace.

The African-American Shakespearean actor Ira Aldridge lived in Hamlet Road.

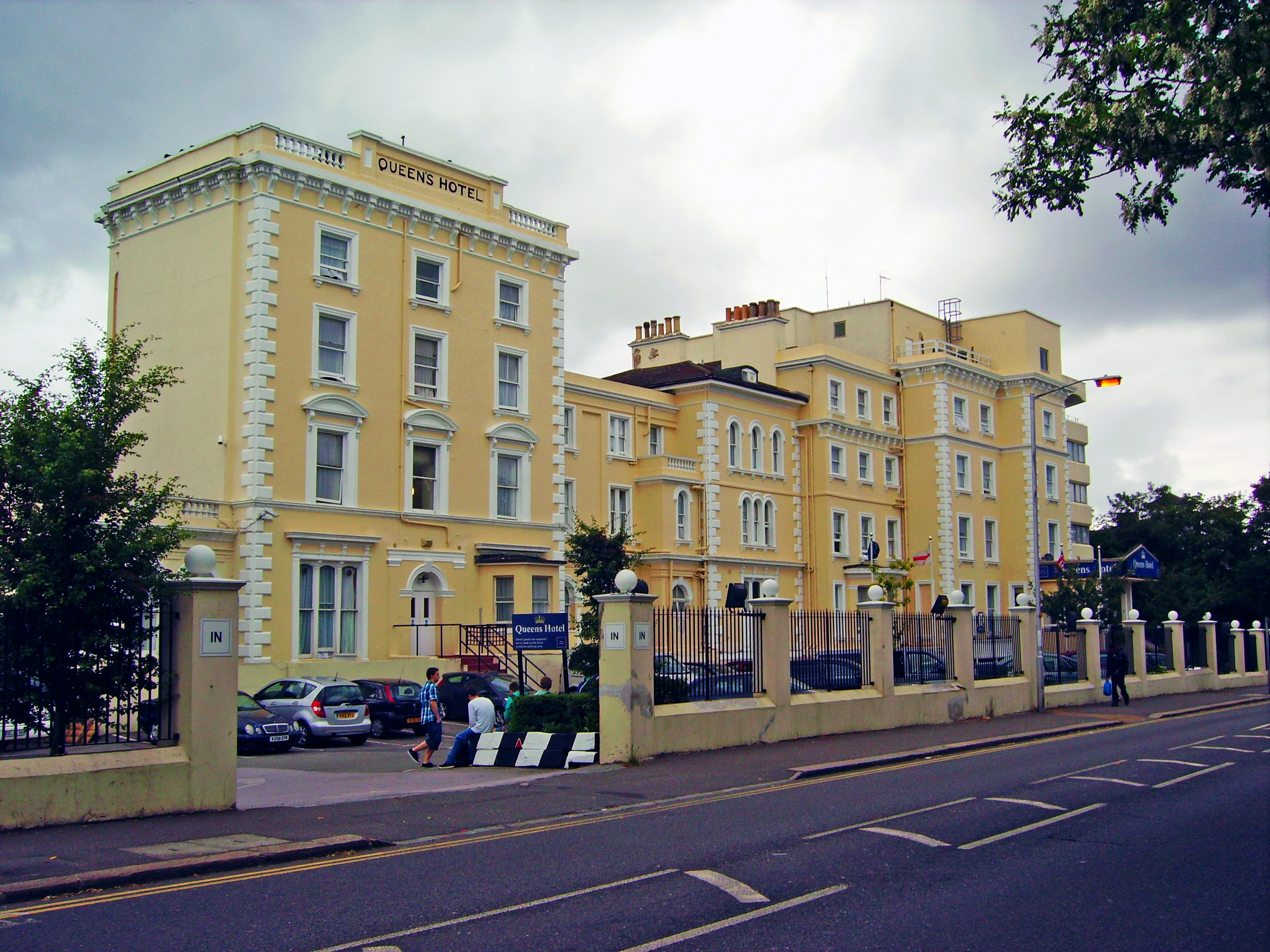
Queen's Hotel on Church Road. Émile Zola stayed here briefly.

The French novelist Émile Zola lived in what is now the Queen's Hotel on Church Road between October 1898 and June 1899. Zola fled to England after being convicted of criminal libel in France on 23 February 1898, a direct consequence of the publication of his open letter J'Accuse…!.

Francis Pettit Smith, one of the inventors of the screw propeller and a contributor to the construction of the SS Archimedes, lived in the area between 1864 and 1870.

British rapper Speech Debelle was born in Crystal Palace. She left the area because of "traffic and parking problems".

Camille Pissarro, Danish-French Impressionist and Neo-Impressionist painter, stayed in Crystal Palace between 1870 and 1871.

Comedy scriptwriter John Sullivan of Only Fools and Horses fame wrote the pilot episode of his debut sitcom Citizen Smith at his in-laws' house in Crystal Palace.

A fuller list of notable people can be found on the same section of the Upper Norwood page.

== Nearest places ==
- Anerley
- Beckenham
- Catford
- Dulwich and Dulwich Wood
- Elmers End
- Forest Hill
- Gipsy Hill
- Penge
- South Norwood
- Sydenham
- Upper Norwood
- West Norwood

== See also ==
- The Crystal Palace
- Crystal Palace Park
- Crystal Palace Dinosaurs
- Crystal Palace National Sports Centre
- Crystal Palace railway station
- Crystal Palace (High Level) railway station
- Crystal Palace pneumatic railway
- Crystal Palace circuit
