= Boltwood =

Boltwood is a surname. Notable people with the surname include:

- Bertram Boltwood (1870–1927), American pioneer of radiochemistry
- Paul Boltwood (1943–2017), Canadian amateur astronomer

== See also ==
- Beltwood House
