= Crystal Palace (Bromley ward) =

Electoral ward in England

- Former electoral ward for the Bromley London Borough Council
- Crystal Palace ward boundaries
- Borough: Bromley
- County: Greater London
- Population: 12,432 (2011)
- Electorate: 9,082 (2018)

Former electoral ward
- Created: 2002
- Abolished: 2022
- Councillors: 2
- Replaced by: Crystal Palace and Anerley; Penge and Cator
- GSS code: E05000116

Crystal Palace Ward was an electoral ward in the London Borough of Bromley from 2002 to 2022.

It covered part of the Crystal Palace area and the entirety of Crystal Palace Park. It has an estimated population of 12,432.

The ward was created for the 2002 local elections from parts of the former wards of Anerley, Lawrie Park & Kent House, and Penge.

== Bromley council elections ==
=== 2018 election ===
The election took place on 3 May 2018.

2018 Bromley London Borough Council election: Crystal Palace
Party	Candidate	Votes	%	±%
Labour	Angela Wilkins	1,985	63.0	+17.4
Labour	Marina Ahmad	1,755	55.7	+18.5
Green	Mark Phillippo	536	17.0	−1.6
Liberal Democrats	Philippa Bridge	527	16.7	−10.4
Conservative	Craig Wilson	442	14.0	+2.6
Conservative	Sunil Gupta	421	13.4	+4.4
Liberal Democrats	David Marshall	309	9.8	−15.0
Turnout		5,975	35	
Registered electors		9,082		
Labour hold		Swing		
Labour hold		Swing		

=== 2014 election ===
Council elections were held on 22 May 2014, at the same time as the European Parliament election. The list of candidates was published on 14 May 2014 - for the first time, UKIP put forward a council candidate in the ward. Tom Papworth's wife Vicki was standing as a Liberal Democrat candidate as the previous councillor - John Canvin - was not standing for re-election in 2014. The Liberal Democrats lost both seats in the ward to the Labour Party. The results were:

2014 Bromley London Borough Council election: Crystal Palace (2)
Party	Candidate	Votes	%	±%
Labour	Angela Wilkins	1,411	45.6	
Labour	Richard Williams	1,151	37.2	
Liberal Democrats	Thomas Papworth	838	27.1	
Liberal Democrats	Victoria Papworth	768	24.8	
Green	Tom Chance	575	18.6	
UKIP	David Hough	361	11.7	
Conservative	Karen Moran	352	11.4	
Conservative	Robert McIlveen	280	9.0	
Turnout		3095	37.06	
Labour gain from Liberal Democrats		Swing		
Labour gain from Liberal Democrats		Swing		

There were 12 spoiled ballots (6 for voting for more candidates than the voter was entitled to and 6 being unmarked or wholly void). Of an electorate of 8351, 3095 ballots were issued.

The results grouped by party were:

Total votes by party in Crystal Palace ward, 2014
Party	Votes
Labour	2,562
Liberal Democrats	1,606
Conservative	632
Green	575
UKIP	361

=== 2010 election ===
The election on 6 May 2010 took place on the same day as the United Kingdom general election.

2010 Bromley London Borough Council election: Crystal Palace (2)
Party	Candidate	Votes	%	±%
Liberal Democrats	John Canvin	2,167	42.4	
Liberal Democrats	Thomas Papworth	1,886		
Labour	Joshua King	1,668	32.6	
Labour	Allison Roche	1,425		
Conservative	Paul Durling	899	17.6	
Conservative	Karen Moran	822		
Green	Maureen Leary	377	7.4	
Green	Lisa Mutti	283		
Turnout		5,148	59.4	
Liberal Democrats hold		Swing		
Liberal Democrats hold		Swing		

One of the Conservative candidates, Karen Moran, previously stood as a candidate in the ward for the Green Party in 2007, 2006 and 2002.

The results grouped by party were:

Total votes by party in Crystal Palace ward, 2010
Party	votes.
Liberal Democrats	4,053
Labour	3,093
Conservative	1,721
Green	660

=== 2007 by-election ===
The by-election was held on 6 September 2007, following the death of Chris Gaster.

2007 Crystal Palace by-election
Party	Candidate	Votes	%
Liberal Democrats	Tom Papworth	1,051	49.7
Labour	Kevin C. Brooks	537	25.4
Conservative	Jason M. Hadden	398	18.8
Green	Karen A. Moran	129	6.1
Majority		514	24.3
Turnout		2,115	24.7
Liberal Democrats hold			

=== 2006 election ===
The election took place on 4 May 2006.

2006 Bromley London Borough Council election: Crystal Palace (2)
Party	Candidate	Votes	%	±%
Liberal Democrats	Christopher Gaster	1,345	47.2	
Liberal Democrats	John Canvin	1,255		
Labour	Claire Francis	680	23.9	
Labour	Richard Williams	674		
Conservative	Nicholas Fordham	435	15.3	
Green	Karen Moran	388	13.6	
Conservative	Michael Kingsford	388		
Turnout			33.2	
Liberal Democrats hold		Swing		
Liberal Democrats hold		Swing		

=== 2002 election ===
The election took place on 2 May 2002.

== Population ==
Based on the results of the 2011 Census, the Office for National Statistics estimated that the population of the ward was 12,432, comprising 6,099 males and 6,333 females.
