= Beltwood House =

Grade II listed mansion in south London

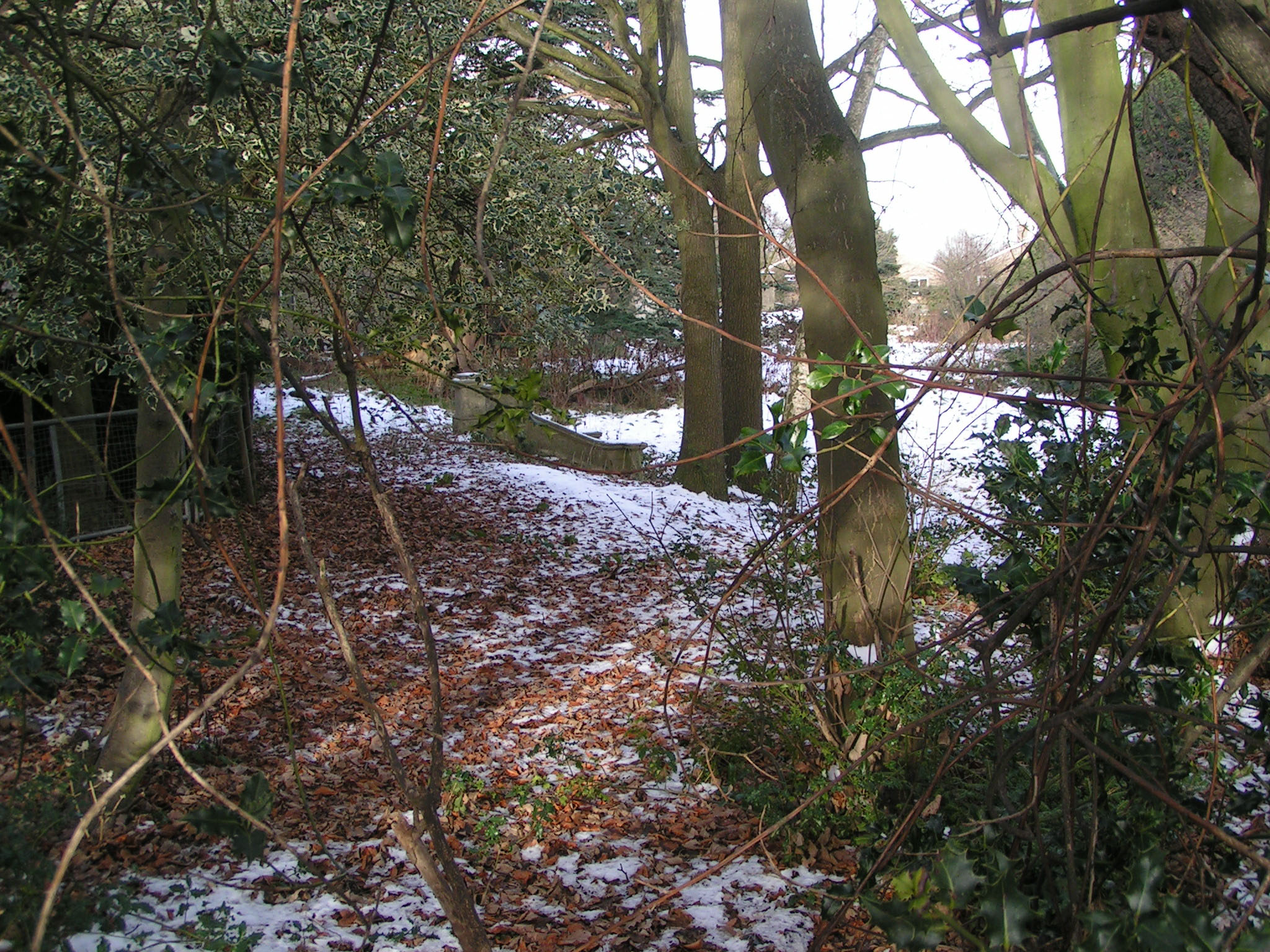
- The grounds of Beltwood House in 2010

General information
- Type: Mansion
- Location: 41 Sydenham Hill, Camberwell, London, England
- Coordinates: 51.4327°N 0.0720°W
- Completed: 1851

Technical details
- Floor count: 3
- Grounds: 1.24 hectares (3.1 acres)

Design and construction
- Designations: Grade II listed

Other information
- Number of rooms: 50

Beltwood House is a Grade II listed building within the Dulwich Wood Conservation Area in south London, England. The large three-storey mansion has fifty rooms and stands in 1.24 hectares (3.1 acres) of wooded grounds, with gatekeeper's lodge. The site has been subject to a blanket tree preservation order since 1985. The house and grounds have been renovated, developed and converted into 12 dwellings which came onto the market in 2022–2023.

== Description ==
The main house faces south-south-east and includes over 1000 m^{2} floor space over four floors, including the basement. Two buildings were located northeast of the main house: the Lodge House, residential with 71 m^{2} floor space over two floors; and the Stable Block which had 95 m^{2} of ground floor garage space and 57 m^{2} of first floor residential space. The front of the main house looks southwards over formal gardens. The Gate House, a separate two-storey residential property (92 m^{2}), is located in the southwest of the grounds, close to the entrance off Sydenham Hill.

An old railway tunnel ran under the estate. On 24 March 1864 the first owner of Beltwood granted "the right of the London Chatham and Dover Railway Company to maintain and use the existing tunnel thereunder." The tunnel was on the railway line from Peckham Rye to Crystal Palace which had been authorised in 1862 and opened in 1865, catering for the expected large numbers of visitors to Crystal Palace. The line closed in 1954 and was dismantled. The disused tunnel currently runs to the south east of the current estate's foot-print.

== History ==
=== Private house ===
The house was built for London Solicitor Edward Saxton and his wife in 1851, possibly by Dulwich College estate architects Banks and Barry. The builder was Richard Woodcock of Forest Hill and the property was one of the first villas on Sydenham Hill. Saxton moved from Islington before the 1851 census, and their daughter was born at Beltwood on 18 March 1852. They had several children while living in Beltwood. A book written by Maria J. Saxton Salès published in 1886 bears the address "Beltwood, Sydenham Hill".

Saxton lived in the house for sixty years until his death on 27 August 1911 at the age of 97, and members of his family continued to live there until 1914. The house was put up for sale by auction on 10 June 1913, described as a "desirable freehold residential property" with an 823 ft frontage, "eleven bed and dressing rooms, three reception rooms, capital domestic offices, stabling, gardener's cottage, pleasure grounds, area 3¾ acres; in excellent repair: for immediate occupation" and in May 1914 John Edward Pickering of Wood Hall, Dulwich was registered as proprietor.

In 1914–15 the house was very extensively remodelled and enhanced in a neoclassical style by Messrs Kemp and How of Bloomsbury. Prior to this it was described as "not only extremely ugly, both inside and outside, but in addition it was most inconvenient. In the first place the rooms were badly situated, very high and ill-proportioned, and the main entrance and kitchen were placed on the south elevation, making it impossible to obtain any privacy in the gardens." The renovation successfully combined decorative styles from the seventeenth and eighteenth centuries with the 'Adamesque' style that was currently popular.

Pickering died in the house on 2 January 1919 at the age of 67 after being thrown from his horse, and his wife Helen Ann continued to live at Beltwood until her death on 6 April 1924. Items of Mrs Pickering's "Old English silver plate, chiefly of the Georgian period" were sold at auction at Christie's on 4 December 1924, and the house, described as "noteworthy for the perfection and extent of its gardens", was to have been auctioned for the executors by Harrods on 24 March 1925, but it was privately sold before the date. An auction of the house contents, including Chippendale furniture, Louis XV and XVI tables, a serpentine Sheraton sideboard, a library of books, pictures, porcelain, clocks, bronzes and Persian carpets was held on 31 March and 1 April 1925 at the house, raising £4,100 (equivalent to about £200,000 in 2010), of which 105 guineas was paid for the Chippendale chairs and 102 guineas for a set of six mahogany Hepplewhite dining chairs with oval backs, carved with the Prince of Wales's Feathers.

The house remained in private ownership until after World War II. John Pickering and his wife were followed by Vincent Holder who lived there until the late 1920s. The house was then bought by Athelstane Wilson Cornforth, who lived there until the 1940s. In 1939, Pharmaceutical Manufacturing Co Ltd of 8, India Street, Minories, London EC3 is documented to have moved temporarily to Beltwood House.

=== Communal use ===
From 1949 to 1961 Beltwood was a children's hospital, first named as Sydenham Invalid Babies Nursery in 1949. By 1954 it was referred to as the Babies Hospital and had 35 beds. It was run by an adoption agency called The Mission of Hope and had two babies’ wards downstairs and a toddlers’ nursery upstairs.

In 1961 the hospital closed, and the house was refurbished and used as a Hall of Residence for about fifty Dental Therapy students for about 15 years. The house then became a YWCA hostel until the 1980s. It was also used as a nurses' home for King's College Hospital and for first-year Dental Therapy students at New Cross Hospital during the 1980s until sometime 1990/91.

It was then occupied by a Christian commune, the Ichthus Christian Fellowship sometime early 1991.

It was restored by English Heritage after its use as student accommodation ended, and was listed as English Heritage Building ID 471378 on 27 May 1993.

The Christian rock band Delirious? set up recording equipment in the house. It was one of the locations where they recorded the album King of fools in 1998.

Planning permission was granted in February 1999 for the construction of eight three-bedroomed houses, the conversion of the main house into three large apartments and extension of the Lodge House. The plans included parking for 27 vehicles. This consent expired, and application to renew it in 2004 was refused on the grounds that there was no provision for affordable housing.

=== Notoriety during 2001–2007 ===
The house was purchased in 2001 by an American woman, Miss Tracy Thier, for £1.1 million. A refurbishment programme led to the house being registered as a hotel, with the intention of running events such as weddings, conferences and parties, with some advertisements describing the venue as a "night club". A party named La Funk Royale was held in December 2004, and events on 17 July and 28 August 2005 brought complaints to the council from members of the public about noise. There were also licensing issues, and the functions ceased.

During the autumn of 2006 Southwark Council received 48 complaints from members of the public about nuisance from animals escaping from Beltwood House. Fencing around the property was insecure and packs of dogs were terrorising members of the public. Dogs strayed onto railway lines causing delays, dogs and a horse were found loose on roads (on one occasion causing a road traffic accident), and there was fouling and damage to residents’ gardens. Neighbours reported continuous barking and howling day and night, and during the period a number of people were attacked and injured by dogs from Beltwood. Two Alsatian dogs injured one woman so badly that she needed extensive plastic surgery. A jogger was surrounded and attacked by dogs and needed emergency surgery. Moreover, during 2006 over 30 stray dogs from Beltwood were taken to Battersea Dogs Home by police or council dog wardens, costing the charity over £54,000. Many people contacted the RSPCA to report animal neglect. A neighbour reported, "It was an ongoing saga which resulted in people getting horrific injuries, several children being chased and one man having a nervous breakdown and leaving the area."

Miss Thier was unwilling to accept responsibility or to remedy the situation, and in June 2007 an Anti-Social Behaviour Order (ASBO) was issued by Southwark Anti-Social Behaviour Unit prohibiting her from keeping animals on the Beltwood Estate and from causing noise nuisance. Miss Thier returned to America, evading prosecution and the £50,000 costs payable to the council, resulting in her being declared bankrupt in her absence. Mortgage arrears led to county court bailiffs repossessing the property on 16 July 2007. RSPCA inspectors removed 64 dogs, 7 horses and 2 peacocks from the grounds, the dogs to Battersea Dogs Home and the horses to the International League for the Protection of Horses. The event was filmed by both BBC and ITV, and was the subject of a BBC documentary broadcast in August 2007.

On 1 August 2007 Beltwood was put on the market with estate agents Mann, selling for £3.5 million. Viewings took two hours, as each room was kept locked with its own key. Upstairs rooms had been used as bedsits, and an outbuilding had been used for events. Viewings ceased when the owner returned to the UK and instigated legal proceedings, and the sale was put on hold. She was arrested and ordered to appear before Tower Bridge Magistrates for the breaches of the ASBO in 2008. District Judge Black gave her a 100-day suspended sentence, and ordered her to complete 100 hours of unpaid work and to pay £1,000 in costs within 28 days.

=== Renovation and development ===
By 2010, Clydesdale Bank had gained vacant possession by evicting squatters, and put the property up for sale through BNP Paribas Real Estate, inviting offers by 24 February 2011.

JKSW Architects stated in mid-2011 that they had a brief to secure planning approval for a development of five contemporary houses within the grounds, to restore Beltwood house "to its former glory", to enlarge the small Gate House, and to restore the grounds. They worked with Alan Baxter & Associates (heritage consultants) and Lloyd Bore (landscape and gardens).

English Heritage, in their October 2011 publication Heritage at Risk, described the condition of the property as "fair", with the observation: "Building contains fine interiors, but currently vacant and suffering effects of water ingress. The curtilage buildings (stables, lodge, two cottages and animal store) are in a poor state of repair."

In November 2011 the property was again put on the market through Hamptons International estate agents with an asking price of £5,750,000. The particulars include full floor plans and photographs. In 2013, a visualisation of plans for development of the site, including restoration of the house and formal gardens and the construction of eight new houses, were published by Thomas Stoney Bryans for John Smart Architects.

Planning permission was granted in March 2018 for the current owner, through his architects Cuozzo Fleming Architects, to create 13 residential units on the site. Seven of these were to be formed through subdivision of the house, five were new-build dwellings within the grounds, and the Arts and Crafts gate house was to be refurbished and extended.

=== Beltwood Park ===
By 2022 the estate had become Beltwood Park, with twelve residences. Six were apartments within the restored house, one occupied the renovated Gate House, and the other five were newly built. The main house included gym and spa facilities for the use of all residents.
