= Vacant possession =

Property law concept

Vacant possession is a property law concept. Vacant possession refers to the typical condition in which a seller must hand over a property to a buyer upon completion, or a tenant must return the property to a landlord at the end of a lease. In simple terms, it means that the rightful person, such as a buyer or a landlord, can peacefully and fully utilize the property. Essentially, vacant possession entails ensuring that the property is unoccupied, free from personal belongings, and not subject to any third-party claims.

Giving 'vacant possession' refers to a legal obligation to ensure that a property is in a state fit to be occupied at a given point in time. Vacant possession is most commonly known of on the sale and purchase of residential property and many find that, on the purchase of a new home, they do not obtain vacant possession as desired. The concept is also an essential element in the grant and termination of leases and other tenancy agreements. It is a topical issue for lawyers and surveyors along with estate agents and others connected to land and buildings.

== Notes ==
- Shaw, Keith (Dr.) Vacant Possession: Law and Practice. Elsevier, Oxford, 2010
