= Bellwood, Florida =

Bellwood is an unincorporated village in Brevard County, Florida, United States east of U.S. 1 on the mainland by the Indian River. Kennedy Space Center and Cape Canaveral are visible from the shoreline which runs the length of the village. The area of Bellwood is only 1 square mile. It is located at 28°29′59″N 80°46′47″W.
