= Marina Ahmad =

British Labour Party politician and trade unionist

Marina Ahmad AM
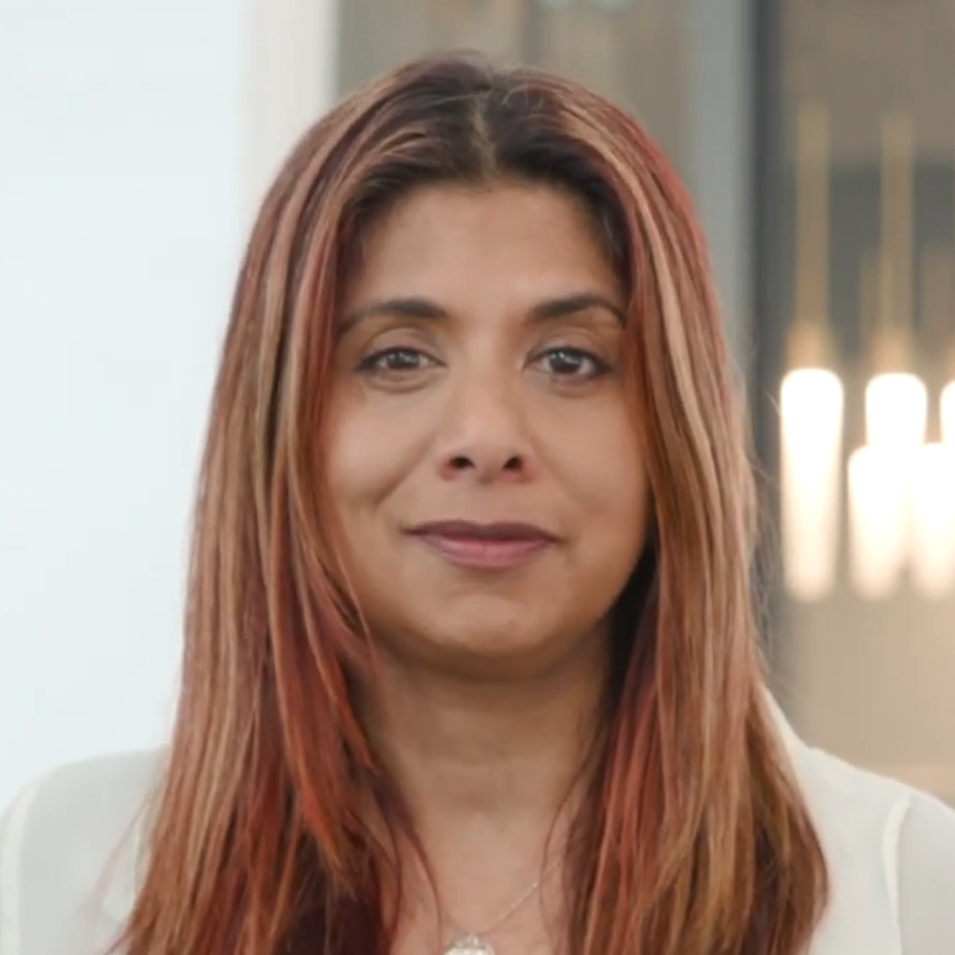
- Ahmad in 2025

Member of the London Assembly for Lambeth and Southwark
- Incumbent
- Assumed office 8 May 2021
- Preceded by: Florence Eshalomi
- Majority: 49,624 (28.5%)

Personal details
- Born: Marina Masuma Ahmad Bangladesh
- Party: Labour and Co-op
- Children: 2
- Education: University of Surrey
- Website: www.marinaahmadlabour.com

Marina Masuma Ahmad is a British Labour Party politician and trade unionist who has been the London Assembly Member for Lambeth and Southwark since the 2021 London Assembly election. She represented Crystal Palace and was an education spokesperson on Bromley Council.

== Early life ==
Ahmad was born in Bangladesh and moved to England at six months old where she grew up on a council estate. She graduated with a Bachelor of Arts in English and History from the University of Surrey.

== Career ==
Ahmad is a trade unionist who has worked in the public sector, the voluntary sector, and for the NHS. She is also a trained barrister, having previously worked for the Crown Prosecution Service. She contested Beckenham in three general elections; 2015, 2017 and 2019.

She represented Crystal Palace ward on Bromley Council from 2018 to 2021, serving as the Council's education spokesperson.

In the 2021 London Assembly election, she was elected as Assembly Member (AM) for Lambeth and Southwark (London Assembly constituency), and has since served as deputy chair of the Economy committee and as a member of the Police and Crime committee.

She is currently Chair of the London Assembly's Economy, Culture and Skills Committee, as well as sitting on the Health Committee and Police and Crime Committee.

As an Assembly Member, she has successfully campaigned for the introduction of free school meals in London, releasing an in-depth report Growing Hungry: The Call for a Childhood Hunger Commission for London. This policy was adopted by Mayor Sadiq Khan, who then pledged to continue the policy for four more years when campaigning in the 2024 election.

In October 2022 it was reported that Ahmad was a candidate to be the prospective parliamentary candidate in Camberwell and Peckham at the 2024 general election. Ahmad did not make the shortlist. In November 2023, Ahmad sought the nomination in Beckenham and Penge.

She founded the anti-racism social policy think tank Race on the Agenda.

== Personal life ==
Ahmad lives in West Wickham with her husband, who is a local GP. They have two children.
