= Bellwood Lake =

Lake in Texas

- Interactive map of Bellwood Lake
- Coordinates: 32°19′33.5″N 95°21′41.4″W

Bellwood Lake is a lake located in the west of Tyler, Texas.

Texas State Highway Loop 323 is located on the east and State Highway Spur 164 is on the west.
