= Lambeth and Southwark (London Assembly constituency) =

- Territorial constituency for the London Assembly
- Lambeth and Southwark shown within London
- Created: 2000
- Number of members: One
- Member: Marina Ahmad
- Party: Labour
- Last election: 2024
- Next election: 2028

Lambeth and Southwark is a constituency represented in the London Assembly.

It consists of the London Borough of Lambeth and London Borough of Southwark.

Since the first assembly elections in 2000 it has been represented by the Labour Party, firstly by Val Shawcross, then by Florence Eshalomi (subsequently MP for Vauxhall, which falls under this constituency), and by Marina Ahmad since 2021.

== Assembly members ==
Year	Member	Party
2000	Val Shawcross	Labour
2016	Florence Eshalomi	Labour
2021	Marina Ahmad	Labour
2024	Marina Ahmad	Labour

== Assembly election results ==
2024 London Assembly election: Lambeth and Southwark
Party	Candidate	Constituency			List		
Party	Candidate	Votes	%	±%	Votes	%	±%
Labour	Marina Ahmad	84,768	48.7	▼0.3	87,161	50.0	
Green	Claire Sheppard	35,144	20.2	▲0.5	30,043	17.2	
Liberal Democrats	Chris French	22,030	12.7	▲1.5	16,116	9.2	
Conservative	Christine Wallace	21,121	12.1	▼4.4	19,823	11.4	
Reform	Tony Sharp	8,942	5.1	▲3.0	6,265	3.6	
Socialist (GB)	Adam Buick	2,082	1.2	New			
Rejoin EU					4,959	2.8	
Animal Welfare					2,501	1.4	
CPA					1,828	1.0	
SDP					1,461	0.8	
Britain First					1,351	0.8	
Independent	Laurence Fox				1,109	0.6	
Communist					945	0.5	
Independent	Farah London				398	0.2	
Heritage					286	0.2	
Independent	Gabe Romualdo				83	0.0	
Majority		49,624	28.5	▼0.8			
Valid votes		174,087			174,329		
Invalid votes		1,341					
Turnout		175,428	39.11		1,111	39.11	
Labour hold		Swing					

2021 London Assembly election: Lambeth and Southwark
Party	Candidate	Votes	%	±%
Labour	Marina Ahmad	91,949	49.0	▼2.6
Green	Claire Sheppard	36,933	19.7	▲5.9
Conservative	Hannah Ginnett	30,855	16.5	▼2.0
Liberal Democrats	Florence Cyrot	20,920	11.2	▼0.2
Reform	John Cronin	3,917	2.1	New
TUSC	April Ashley	2,919	1.6	New
Majority		55,016	29.3	▼3.8
Total formal votes		187,493		
Informal votes		2,976		
Turnout		190,469		
Labour hold		Swing		

2016 London Assembly election: Lambeth and Southwark
Party	Candidate	Votes	%	±%
Labour	Florence Eshalomi	96,946	51.6	▼1.2
Conservative	Robert Flint	34,703	18.5	▼0.9
Green	Rashid Nix	25,793	13.8	▲2.3
Liberal Democrats	Michael Bukola	21,489	11.4	▼0.3
UKIP	Idham Ramadi	6,591	3.5	▲0.7
Socialist (GB)	Kevin Parkin	1,333	0.7	▼1.2
All People's Party	Amadu Kanumansa	906	0.5	New
Majority		62,242	33.1	▼0.3
Total formal votes		187,761	98.8	▲0.3
Informal votes		2,229	1.2	▲0.3
Turnout		189,990	44.0	▲6.7
Labour hold		Swing		

2012 London Assembly election: Lambeth and Southwark
Party	Candidate	Votes	%	±%
Labour	Val Shawcross	83,239	52.8	+16.4
Conservative	Michael Mitchell	30,537	19.4	−0.3
Liberal Democrats	Rob Blackie	18,359	11.7	−10.5
Green	Jonathan Bartley	18,144	11.5	+0.7
UKIP	James Fluss	4,395	2.8	+1.0
Socialist (GB)	Daniel Lambert	2,938	1.9	+0.9
Majority		52,702	33.4	+19.2
Total formal votes		157,612	98.5	
Informal votes		2,446	1.5	
Turnout		160,058	37.3	−4.8
Labour hold		Swing		

2008 London Assembly election: Lambeth and Southwark
Party	Candidate	Votes	%	±%
Labour	Valerie Shawcross	60,601	36.4	+7.3
Liberal Democrats	Caroline Pidgeon	36,953	22.2	–2.5
Conservative	Shirley Houghton	32,835	19.7	+5.8
Green	Shane Collins	18,011	10.8	+1.3
Christian (CPA)	Geoff Macharia	4,432	2.7	−0.2
UKIP	Jens Wilton	3,012	1.8	–5.2
Left List	Katt Young	1,956	1.2	New
English Democrat	Janus Polencues	1,867	1.1	New
Animal Welfare	Jasmijn de Boo	1,828	1.1	New
Socialist (GB)	Daniel Lambert	1,588	1.0	New
Majority		23,648	14.2	+9.8
Turnout		166,328	42.1	+8.7
Labour hold		Swing		

2004 London Assembly election: Lambeth and Southwark
Party	Candidate	Votes	%	±%
Labour	Valerie Shawcross	36,280	29.1	–4.9
Liberal Democrats	Caroline Pidgeon	30,805	24.7	+4.6
Conservative	Bernard Gentry	17,379	13.9	–3.3
Green	Shane Collins	11,900	9.5	–2.3
UKIP	Frank Maloney	8,776	7.0	New
Respect	Janet Noble	4,930	4.0	New
CPA	Simisola Lawanson	3,655	2.9	New
Majority		5,475	4.4	–9.5
Turnout		124,622	33.38	+1.4
Labour hold		Swing		

2000 London Assembly election: Lambeth and Southwark
Party	Candidate	Votes	%	±%
Labour	Valerie Shawcross	37,985	37.6	N/A
Liberal Democrats	Peter Facey	22,492	22.3	N/A
Conservative	Irene Kimm	19,238	19.0	N/A
Green	Storm Poorun	13,242	9.5	N/A
London Socialist	Theresa Bennett	6,231	6.2	N/A
Humanist	Tony Robinson	1,261	1.3	N/A
Communist League	Jonathan Silberman	536	0.5	N/A
Majority		15,493	15.3	N/A
Turnout		100,985	29.0	N/A
Labour win (new seat)				

== Mayoral election results ==
Below are the results for the candidate which received the highest share of the popular vote in the constituency at each mayoral election.

Year	Party	Candidate
2000	Independent	Ken Livingstone
2004	Labour	Ken Livingstone
2008	Labour	Ken Livingstone
2012	Labour	Ken Livingstone
2016	Labour	Sadiq Khan
2021	Labour	Sadiq Khan
2024	Labour	Sadiq Khan

2024 London mayoral election (Lambeth and Southwark)
Party	Candidate	Votes	%	±%
Labour	Sadiq Khan	106,861	61.2	N/A
Conservative	Susan Hall	26,347	15.1	N/A
Green	Zoë Garbett	12,446	7.12	N/A
Liberal Democrats	Rob Blackie	11,463	6.56	N/A
Independent	Natalie Campbell	4,005	2.29	N/A
Reform	Howard Cox	3,990	2.28	N/A
SDP	Amy Gallagher	2,167	1.24	N/A
Count Binface for Mayor of London	Count Binface	1,838	1.05	N/A
Animal Welfare	Femy Amin	1,675	0.959	N/A
Independent	Andreas Michli	1,528	0.874	N/A
Britain First	Nick Scanlon	1043	0.597	N/A
Independent	Tarun Ghulati	954	0.546	N/A
London Real	Brian Rose	427	0.244	N/A
Turnout		175,532	39.1%	−2.24%
Rejected ballots		788		
Registered electors		448,552		+2.71%

2021 London mayoral election (Lambeth and Southwark)
Party	Candidate	1st round		2nd round			1st round votesTransfer votes, 2nd round
Party	Candidate	Total	Of round	Transfers	Total	Of round	1st round votesTransfer votes, 2nd round
Labour	Sadiq Khan	93,437	50.9%				
Conservative	Shaun Bailey	36,471	19.9%				
Green	Siân Berry	21,149	11.5%				
Liberal Democrats	Luisa Porritt	9,773	5.33%				
Reclaim	Laurence Fox	2,911	1.59%				
Independent	Niko Omilana	2,779	1.51%				
Women's Equality	Mandu Reid	2,346	1.28%				
Count Binface for Mayor of London	Count Binface	2,240	1.22%				
London Real	Brian Rose	2,202	1.2%				
Rejoin EU	Richard Hewison	1,915	1.04%				
Let London Live	Piers Corbyn	1,581	0.862%				
Animal Welfare	Vanessa Hudson	1,100	0.6%				
Independent	Farah London	934	0.509%				
Independent	Nims Obunge	840	0.458%				
UKIP	Peter John Gammons	770	0.42%				
SDP	Steve Kelleher	741	0.404%				
Heritage	David Kurten	679	0.37%				
Burning Pink	Valerie Brown	570	0.311%				
Independent	Max Fosh	544	0.297%				
Renew	Kam Balayev	461	0.251%				
Turnout		190,772	41.4%				
Registered electors		461,056					

2016 London mayoral election (Lambeth and Southwark)
Party	Candidate	1st round		2nd round			1st round votesTransfer votes, 2nd round
Party	Candidate	Total	Of round	Transfers	Total	Of round	1st round votesTransfer votes, 2nd round
Labour	Sadiq Khan	103,829	55.6%				
Conservative	Zac Goldsmith	38,216	20.5%				
Green	Siân Berry	16,377	8.76%				
Liberal Democrats	Caroline Pidgeon	12,752	6.82%				
Women's Equality	Sophie Walker	5,571	2.98%				
UKIP	Peter Whittle	3,670	1.96%				
Respect	George Galloway	1,927	1.03%				
Cannabis is Safer than Alcohol	Lee Eli Harris	1,543	0.826%				
Britain First	Paul Golding	1,412	0.756%				
BNP	David Furness	686	0.367%				
Independent	Prince Zylinski	572	0.306%				
One Love	Ankit Love	296	0.158%				
Turnout		190,132	44.5%				
Registered electors		427,176					

2012 London mayoral election (Lambeth and Southwark)
Party	Candidate	1st round		2nd round			1st round votesTransfer votes, 2nd round
Party	Candidate	Total	Of round	Transfers	Total	Of round	1st round votesTransfer votes, 2nd round
Labour	Ken Livingstone	78,333	49.7%				
Conservative	Boris Johnson	47,856	30.3%				
Green	Jenny Jones	10,754	6.82%				
Liberal Democrats	Brian Paddick	9,946	6.3%				
Independent	Siobhan Benita	7,688	4.87%				
UKIP	Lawrence Webb	1,855	1.18%				
BNP	Carlos Cortiglia	1,325	0.84%				
Turnout		160,397	37.9%				
Registered electors		422,981					

2008 London mayoral election (Lambeth and Southwark)
Party	Candidate	1st round		2nd round			1st round votesTransfer votes, 2nd round
Party	Candidate	Total	Of round	Transfers	Total	Of round	1st round votesTransfer votes, 2nd round
Labour	Ken Livingstone	80,172	48.9%				
Conservative	Boris Johnson	47,754	29.1%				
Liberal Democrats	Brian Paddick	20,530	12.5%				
Green	Siân Berry	7,190	4.39%				
Christian Choice	Alan Craig	2,838	1.73%				
BNP	Richard Barnbrook	2,448	1.49%				
Left List	Lindsey German	1,199	0.732%				
UKIP	Gerard Batten	848	0.517%				
English Democrat	Matt O'Connor	506	0.309%				
Independent	Winston McKenzie	392	0.239%				
Turnout		166,693	42.2%				
Registered electors		395,202					

2004 London mayoral election (Lambeth and Southwark)
Party	Candidate	1st round		2nd round			1st round votesTransfer votes, 2nd round
Party	Candidate	Total	Of round	Transfers	Total	Of round	1st round votesTransfer votes, 2nd round
Labour	Ken Livingstone	55,547	46%				
Liberal Democrats	Simon Hughes	27,158	22.5%				
Conservative	Steve Norris	20,230	16.8%				
UKIP	Frank Maloney	4,648	3.85%				
Green	Darren Johnson	4,483	3.71%				
CPA	Ram Gidoomal	3,014	2.5%				
Respect	Lindsey German	2,930	2.43%				
BNP	Julian Leppert	1,840	1.52%				
Independent Working Class Action	Lorna Reid	583	0.483%				
Independent	Tammy Nagalingam	265	0.22%				
Turnout		124,492	33.3%				
Registered electors		373,294					

2000 London mayoral election (Lambeth and Southwark)
Party	Candidate	1st round		2nd round			1st round votesTransfer votes, 2nd round
Party	Candidate	Total	Of round	Transfers	Total	Of round	1st round votesTransfer votes, 2nd round
Independent	Ken Livingstone	52,028	47.6%				
Conservative	Steve Norris	18,437	16.9%				
Labour	Frank Dobson	15,863	14.5%				
Liberal Democrats	Susan Kramer	13,139	12%				
Green	Darren Johnson	3,061	2.8%				
CPA	Ram Gidoomal	2,917	2.67%				
BNP	Michael Newland	1,572	1.44%				
Independent	Ashwin Kumar	815	0.746%				
UKIP	Damian Hockney	616	0.564%				
Pro-Motorist Small Shop	Geoffrey Ben-Nathan	469	0.429%				
Natural Law	Geoffrey Clements	323	0.296%				
Turnout		111,697	32%				
Registered electors		348,518					
