= Capital Ring =

78-mile circular walk around London

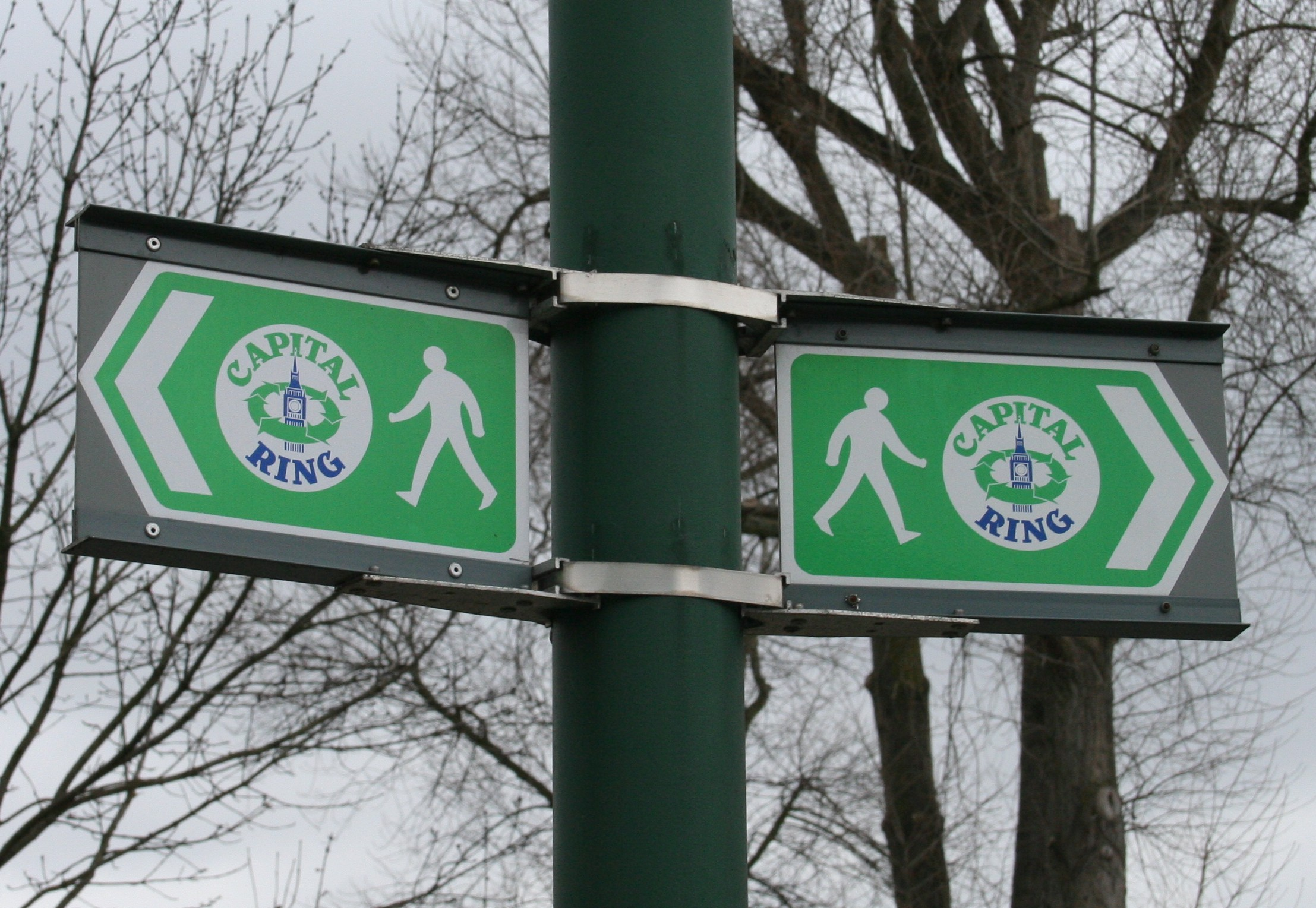
- Capital Ring sign near Preston Road tube station
- Length: c. 78 mi (126 km) (see below)
- Location: Greater London
- Trailheads: Circular
- Use: Walking

Trail map
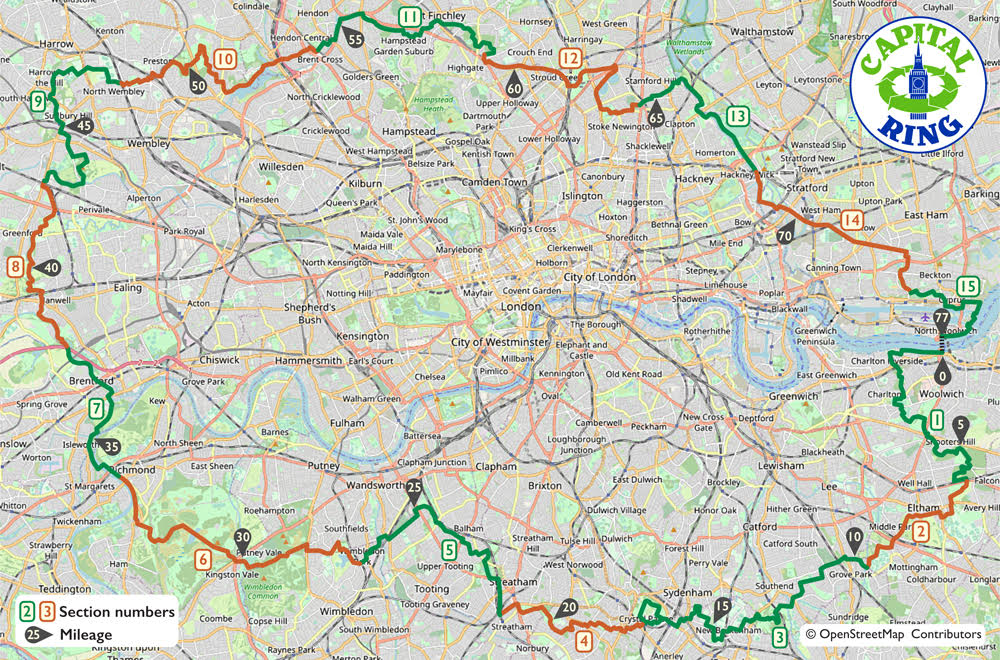

The Capital Ring is a strategic circular walking route in London, around 125 km (78 mi) in length. It is promoted by London's 33 local councils, led by the City of London Corporation in partnership with the Greater London Authority and its functional body for regional transport, Transport for London, through which much of the funding is provided.

The route passes through green areas of urban and suburban London. It is called a "ring" because the route completely encircles inner and central London. The official start of the route is the Woolwich foot tunnel, but the nature of the route means that it can be started or finished at any point. The route signs feature a logo showing Big Ben in a ring of arrows.

== History ==
The route was planned in around 1990 by the London Walking Forum, a group founded by the Countryside Commission and the Government Office for London working with London's borough councils. It was officially opened on 21 September 2005 with a launch event at Highgate Wood.

== Route sections ==
Some Capital Ring sections start and/or end at public transport stops. However, most sections involve a further signposted 'Capital Ring Link' to the nearest railway or underground station. Additionally, there are waymarked 'Capital Ring Links' to stations midway along some sections.

Section	Description	Public transport links		
Section	Description	Section start	Section end	Further signposted links along the section
1	Woolwich to Falconwood	link from Woolwich Arsenal station	link to Falconwood station	
2	Falconwood to Grove Park	link from Falconwood station	link to Grove Park station	Mottingham station
3	Grove Park to Crystal Palace	link from Grove Park station	Crystal Palace station	Ravensbourne station Beckenham Junction station Kent House station Penge East station (route passes through it) Penge West station
4	Crystal Palace to Streatham	Crystal Palace station	link to Streatham Common station	
5	Streatham to Wimbledon Park	link from Streatham Common station	Wimbledon Park underground station	Balham station Wandsworth Common station (route passes through it) Earlsfield station (route passes by it)
6	Wimbledon Park to Richmond	Wimbledon Park underground station	link to Richmond station	
7	Richmond to Osterley Lock	link from Richmond station	link to Boston Manor underground station	Brentford station
8	Osterley Lock to Greenford	link from Boston Manor station	link to Greenford station	Hanwell station
9	Greenford to South Kenton	link from Greenford station	South Kenton station	Harrow on the Hill station Northwick Park underground station
10	South Kenton to Hendon Park	South Kenton station	link to Hendon Central tube station	Wembley Park tube station Hendon station
11	Hendon Park to Highgate	link from Hendon Central tube station	link to Highgate tube station	East Finchley tube station (route passes through it)
12	Highgate to Stoke Newington	link from Highgate tube station	link to Stoke Newington station	Crouch Hill station Finsbury Park station
13	Stoke Newington to Hackney Wick	link from Stoke Newington station	link to Hackney Wick station	Clapton station
14	Hackney Wick to Beckton District Park	link from Hackney Wick station	link to Royal Albert DLR	West Ham station
15	Beckton District Park to Woolwich	link from Royal Albert DLR	at the start of section 1	Cyprus DLR (route passes through it) Gallions Reach DLR (route passes by it) and King George V DLR

== Route descriptions ==
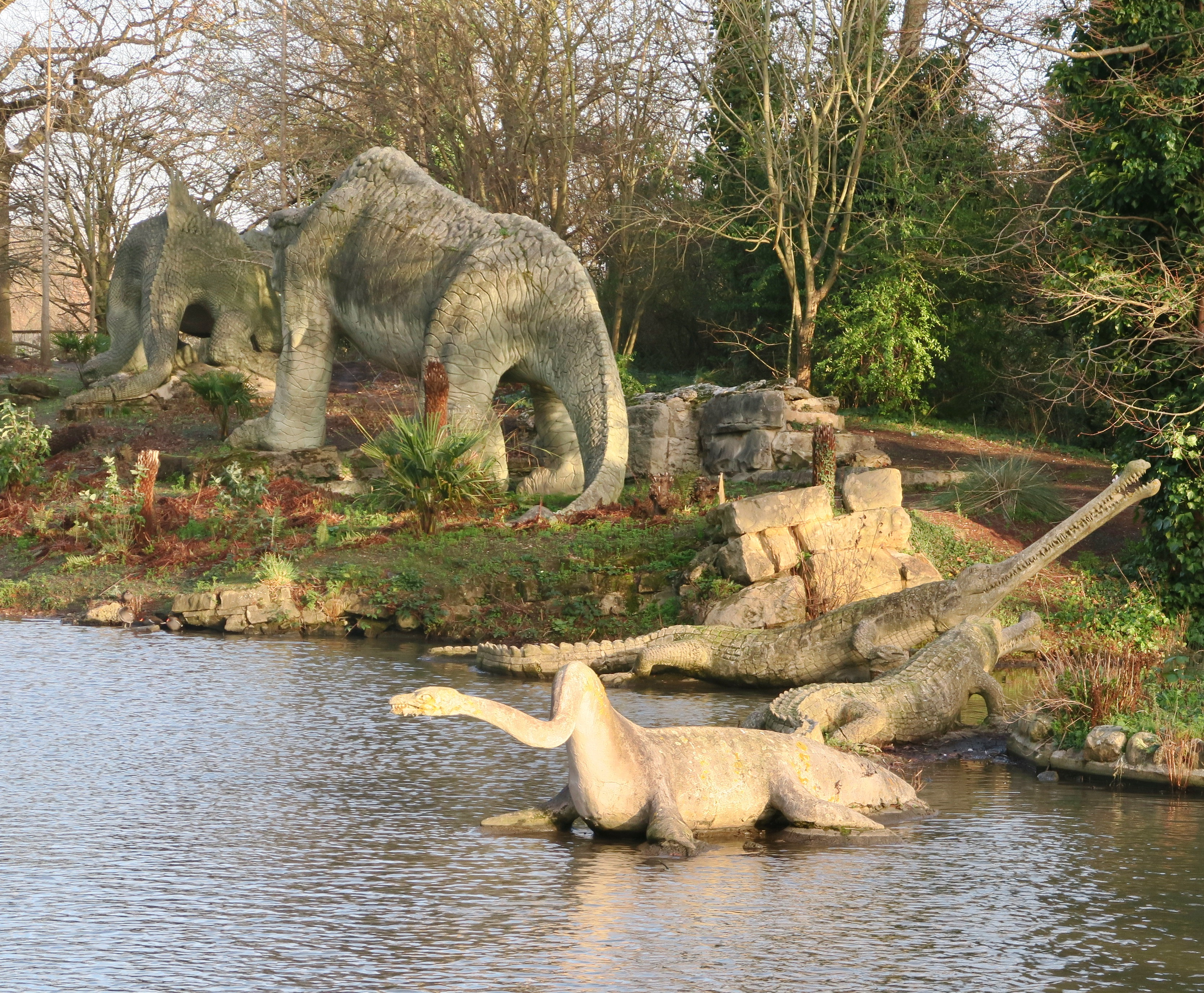
Dinosaurs in Crystal Palace Park

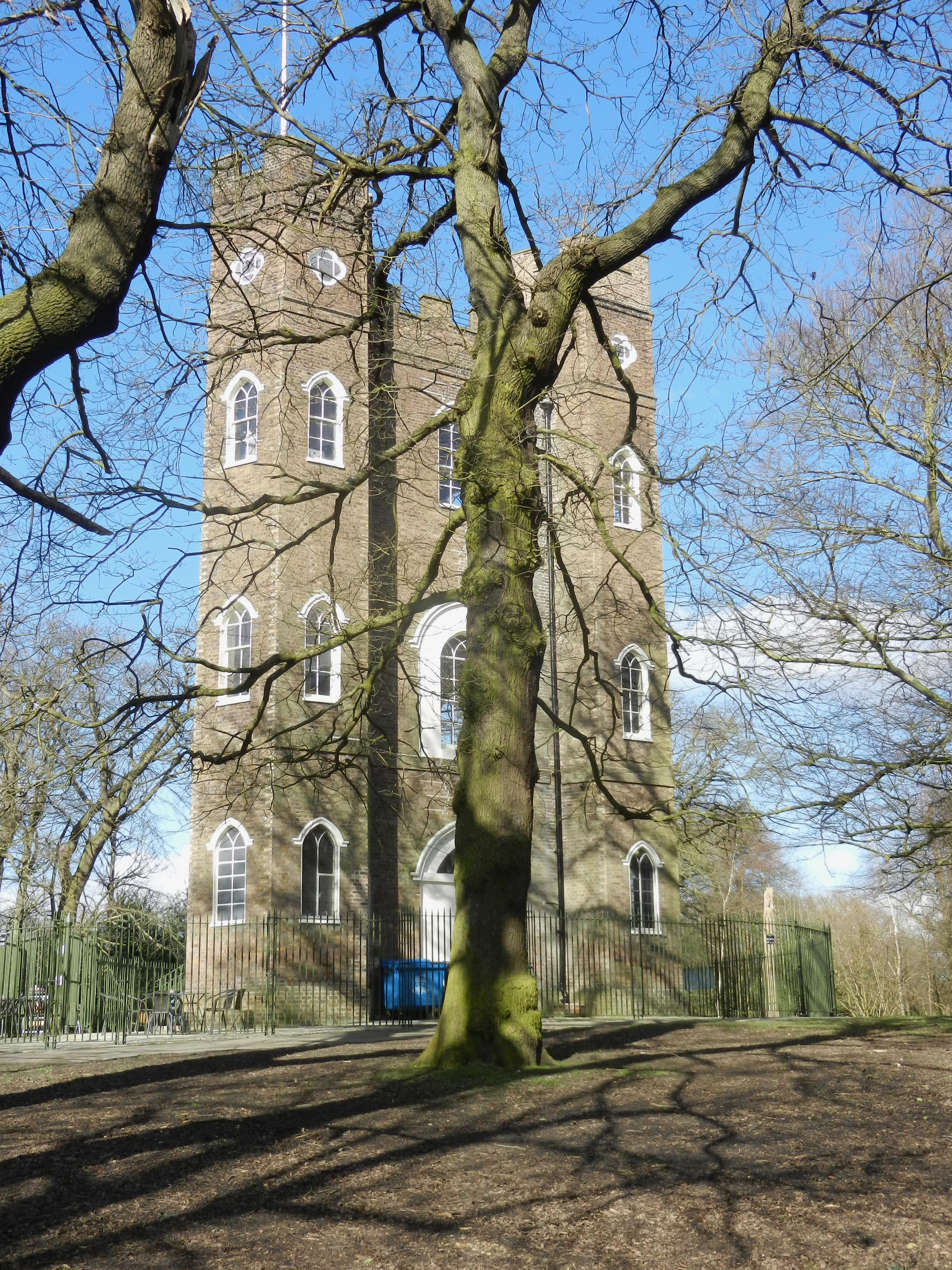
Severndroog Castle

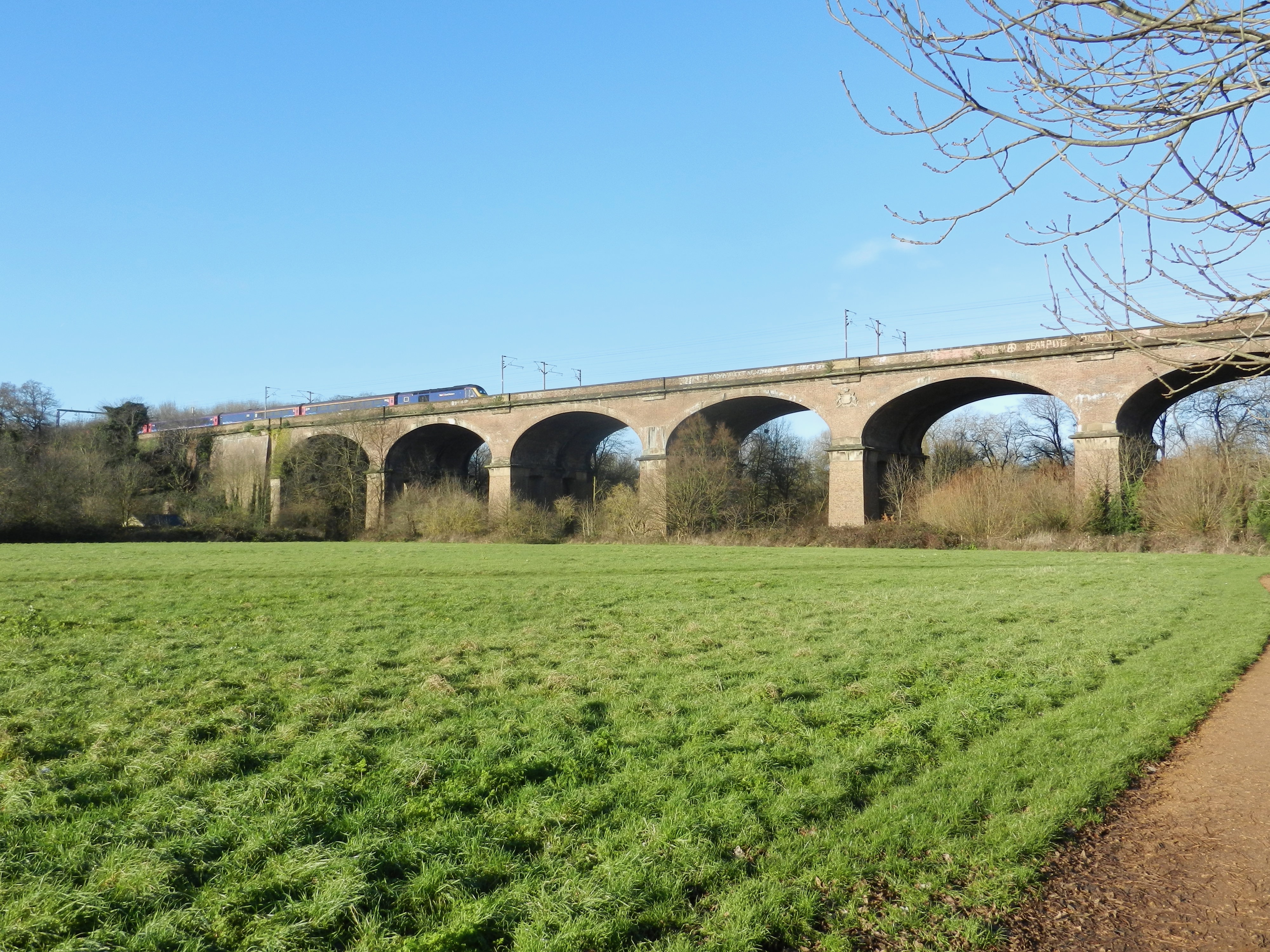
Wharncliffe Viaduct

=== South-east London ===
Here the Capital Ring comprises three walks, 1 to 3. These are part of the South East London Green Chain. It starts from the Woolwich foot tunnel and ends in Crystal Palace Park. Points of interest in this section include the Thames Barrier, Severndroog Castle, Eltham Palace and the remains of The Crystal Palace.

=== South London ===
In this section, the trail comprises two walks, walk 4 and 5. Points of interest in this section include Biggin Wood (one of the few remnants of the Great North Wood), Streatham Common, Tooting Bec Lido and Wandsworth Common. The part around Balham and Earlsfield is the nearest part of the ring to central London (about 4.5 miles from Charing Cross).

=== South-west London ===
Here the Capital Ring comprises two walks, walk 6 and 7. Walk 6 consists of a brief walk through suburban Wimbledon Park, then crosses Wimbledon Common, intersects the Beverley Brook Walk and then crosses Richmond Park. While the route passes within about 100 metres of King Henry VIII's Mound, with its protected view of St Paul's Cathedral, this is not indicated on the signposts for the route. Walk 7 continues from Richmond along the Thames, before deviating through old Isleworth, then through the grounds of Syon Park. It then continues along the Grand Union Canal to Osterley Lock.

=== West and north-west London ===
Here the Capital Ring comprises two walks, walk 8 and 9. Points of interest in this section include the River Brent, the Wharncliffe Viaduct, Horsenden Hill (with panoramic views) and Harrow School. The Capital Ring's most distant part from central London is in Harrow (about 10 miles from Charing Cross).

=== North London ===
The Capital Ring comprises two walks, walk 10 and 11, in North London.

Walk 10 starts from South Kenton railway station, crosses Preston Park and passes Preston Road underground station, before reaching Fryent Country Park. It then heads south and east to Brent Reservoir and West Hendon where it crosses the Edgware Road, M1 motorway and A41 to reach Hendon Park, near Hendon Central Underground station.

Walk 11 starts at Hendon Park, again following the River Brent and Mutton Brook through Hampstead Garden Suburb. It passes East Finchley Underground station, Cherry Tree Wood and Highgate Wood (complete with a tea shop, interpretive display, and green grassy picnic area). From here it passes through Queen's Wood to the Northern Line's Highgate Underground station.

=== North-east London ===
The Capital Ring here is made up of two walks, walk 12 and 13. Walk 12 covers Highgate to Stoke Newington, and walk 13 Stoke Newington to Hackney Wick.

Walk 12 starts at the Priory Gardens entrance to Highgate Underground station and follows the Parkland Walk past Crouch End to Finsbury Park. After crossing the park it follows the New River past the Stoke Newington reservoirs. It then crosses Clissold Park and Abney Park Cemetery before reaching Stoke Newington railway station; Stoke Newington is also served by the 73 bus. Walk 13 heads east through the streets of Lower Clapton to Springfield Park before following the River Lee Navigation south through Lea Bridge to White Post Lane, near Hackney Wick railway station.

=== East London ===
In this area, the Capital Ring comprises two walks. Walk 14 passes through the area used for the London 2012 Summer Olympics, including the new Pudding Mill Lane DLR station. This walk follows The Greenway for most of its distance passing Abbey Mills Pumping Station, sometimes known as the ‘Cathedral of Sewage’, that was built by Joseph Bazalgette. Walk 15 explores docklands with fine views over the Thames, the Royal Albert Dock and London City Airport. This walk ends at the Woolwich foot tunnel under the Thames which leads back to the start of the Ring.

== Length ==
Authorities do not agree on the length of the route. Walk London give the length as 125 km (78 mi), though the distances they give for the 15 sections sum to 133 km (83 mi), and they quote an average length of the 15 sections of 7.8 km (4.8 mi), which produces a total of 117 km (73 mi). The total is only 115 km (71 mi) according to the Ramblers; the Transport for London website gives it as 126 km (78 mi). Plotting the official route on digital 1:25,000 mapping gives a length of about 120 km (75 mi).

== Ultramarathon ==
The southern section of the Capital Ring, from Woolwich to Richmond Park, provides the route for the 55 km (34 mi) London Ultra Marathon.

== See also ==
- London Outer Orbital Path (the "London LOOP") – a longer walking route around outer London.
