= Penge railway station =

Penge railway station may refer to two nearby stations in south-east London, both originally named Penge:

- Penge East railway station, on the Chatham Main Line
- Penge West railway station, on the line from London Bridge to Croydon
