= Preston Park =

Preston Park may refer to:

In England

- Preston Park, Brighton, a park and area of Brighton
  - Preston Park railway station, Brighton
- Preston Park (Brent), London, a park
- Preston Park, Stockton-on-Tees, a park
- For parks in Preston, Lancashire, see Category:Parks and commons in Preston, Lancashire

In the United States

- Preston Park, Pennsylvania
- Preston Park, Roanoke, Virginia
