= Clock House railway station =

National Rail station in London, England

Clock House
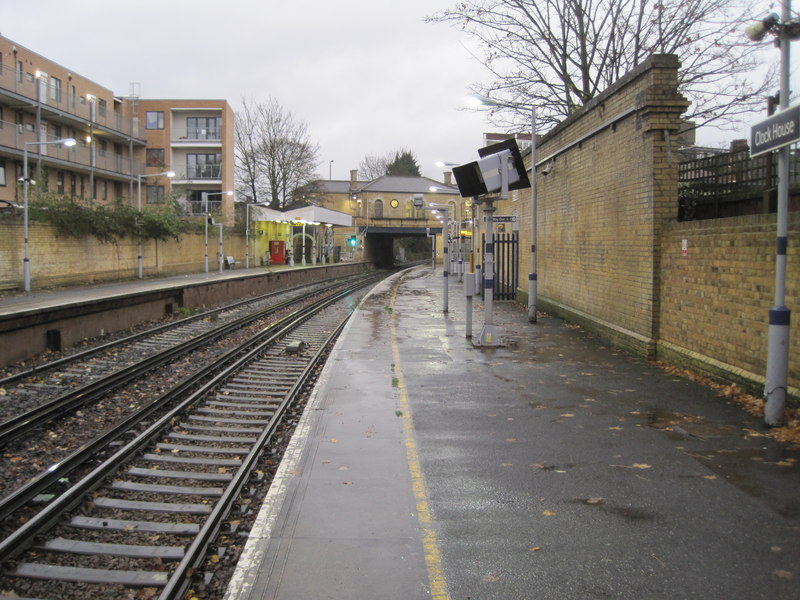
- Interactive map of Clock House

General information
- Location: Beckenham
- Local authority: London Borough of Bromley
- Managed by: Southeastern
- Station code: CLK
- DfT category: D
- Number of platforms: 2
- Fare zone: 4
- OSI: Kent House

National Rail annual entry and exit
- 2020–21: ▼0.208 million
- Interchange: ▼26
- 2021–22: ▲0.559 million
- Interchange: ▲58
- 2022–23: ▲0.778 million
- Interchange: ▲1,896
- 2023–24: ▲0.970 million
- Interchange: ▲1,912
- 2024–25: ▲1.067 million
- Interchange: ▼901

Key dates
- 1 May 1890: Opened

Other information
- External links: Departures; Facilities
- Coordinates: 51.4085°N 0.0410°W

Clock House railway station serves the London Borough of Bromley, in south-east London, England. It lies 10 miles 23 chains (16.6 km) down the line from London Charing Cross, between Beckenham and Penge; it is in London fare zone 4. The station and all trains serving it are operated by Southeastern on the Hayes line.

The station, which was opened by the South Eastern Railway in 1890, is named after the nearby residence of the Cator Family which was demolished in 1896. Clock House retains its original street level booking hall and the remnants of its platform canopies and was formerly known for its tendency to flood whenever overwhelmed by the Chaffinch brook. The station name can be spelt either Clock House or Clockhouse. For example, the previous station signage used the latter (historically inaccurate) form, whilst the published timetables use the former version. The new Southeastern rebranded station signage and livery has since corrected this inaccuracy.

== History ==
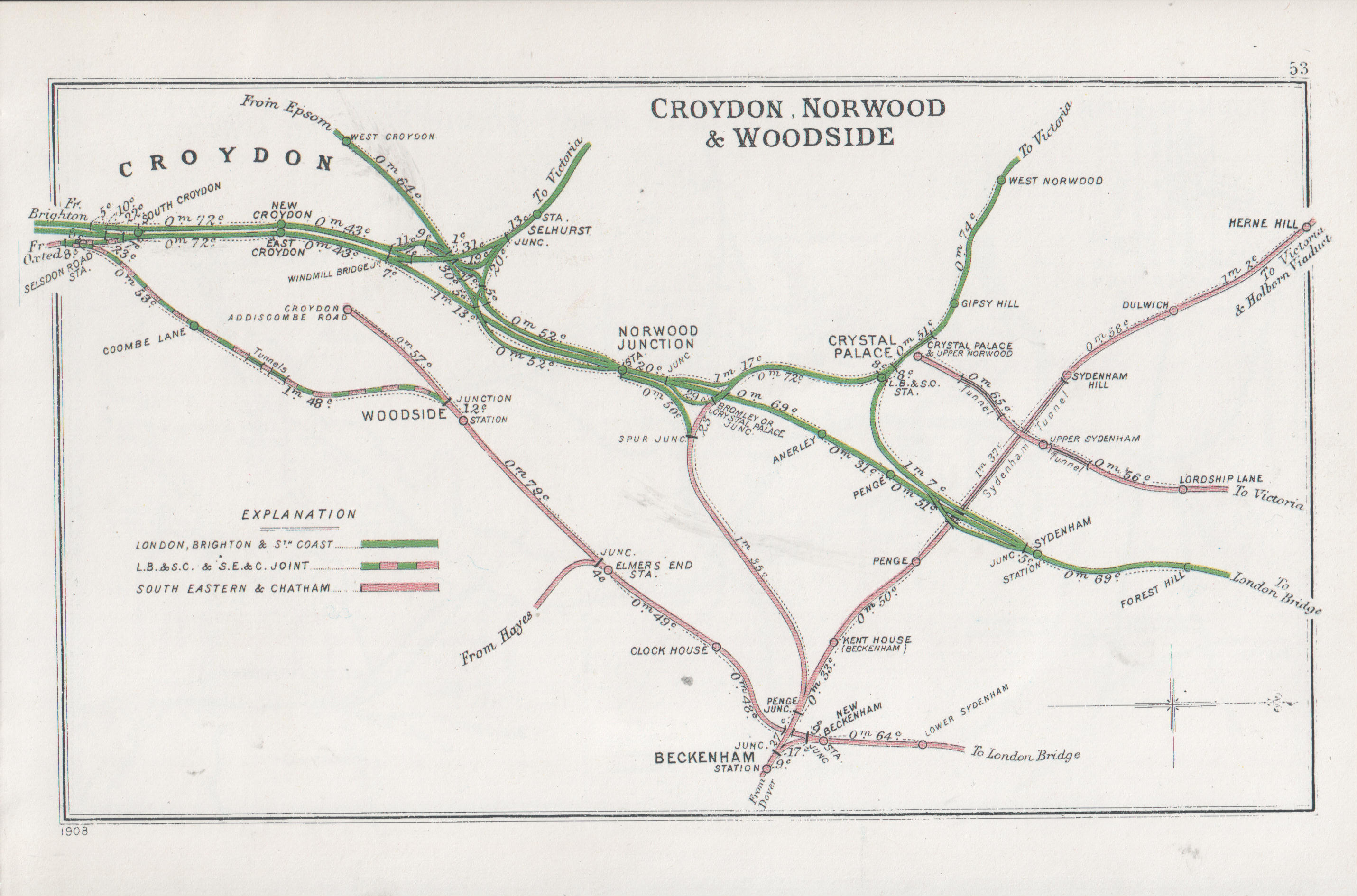
A 1908 Railway Clearing House map of part of the Hayes Line, between Lower Sydenham and Elmers End; it shows the now closed Addiscombe Line and W&SCR branches off the Hayes Line

=== Early years (1857-1922) ===
The Mid-Kent line was built by the Mid-Kent and North Kent Junction Railway (MK&NKJR) and was opened on 1 January 1857 as far as Beckenham Junction. From opening, the line was worked by the South Eastern Railway (SER).

Seven years later, the MK&NKJR built an extension from a new junction station at New Beckenham to Croydon (Addiscombe Road) with an intermediate station at Elmers End, which again was operated by the SER.

House building commenced in the area in 1885 and Clock House station was opened on 1 May 1890. The station was equipped with a goods yard on the down side from opening. The 18-lever signal box was located on the up side at the south end of the station.

The Elmers End – Hayes section was built by the West Wickham & Hayes Railway, but was sold to the South Eastern Railway on opening day, 29 May 1882. (Note: The current Hayes service (2016) which serves the station uses the 1857 line to New Beckenham, the 1864 line to Elmers End and the 1882 line to Hayes.)

In 1898, the South Eastern Railway and its bitter rivals the London Chatham and Dover Railway agreed to work as one railway company under the name of the South Eastern and Chatham Railway and Clock House became an SECR station.

=== Southern Railway (1923-1947) ===
Following the Railways Act 1921 (also known as the Grouping Act), Clock House became a Southern Railway station on 1 January 1923.

The Mid-Kent line was electrified with the 750 V DC third rail system and electric services commenced on 28 February 1926; these were worked by early Southern Railway three-car multiple units, often built from old SECR carriages. In connection with the electrification, the track bed in the Clock House area was raised in an effort to reduce flooding. Electrification led to further house building between Clock House and Elmers End.

=== British Railways (1948-1994) ===
After World War II and following nationalisation on 1 January 1948, the station fell under the auspices of British Railways' Southern Region. Three-aspect colour light signals were installed at the station in 1956, controlled by New Beckenham signal box (in the down direction) and Elmers End (up direction).

The signal box at the station was taken out of use on 19 August 1962, where it presumably had been used to control access to the goods yard.

The goods yard was closed on 19 April 1965.

On 28 May 1975, all signalling came under the control of the London Bridge Signalling Centre.

Upon sectorisation in 1982, London & South East operated commuter services in the London area; it was renamed Network SouthEast in 1986.

=== The privatisation era (1994-present day) ===
Following privatisation of British Rail on 1 April 1994, the infrastructure at New Beckenham station became the responsibility of Railtrack. On 13 October 1996, operation of the passenger services passed to Connex South Eastern.

On 30 November 2005, the Department for Transport awarded Govia the Integrated Kent franchise. The services operated by South Eastern Trains transferred to Southeastern on 1 April 2006.

== Accessibility ==
Platform 2 (trains towards Hayes) has step-free access, but platform 1 (trains towards London) has access available via steps only.

== Services ==
All services at Clock House are operated by Southeastern using Class 376, 465, 466 and 707 electric multiple units.

The typical off-peak service in trains per hour is:

- 4 tph to London Charing Cross (2 of these run non-stop between Ladywell and London Bridge and 2 call at Lewisham)
- 4 tph to Hayes.

On Sundays, the station is served by a half-hourly service between Hayes and London Charing Cross via Lewisham.

Preceding station	National Rail	Following station
New Beckenham	Southeastern Hayes Line	Elmers End

== Connections ==
Kent House station is an 8-minute walk from this station, and has trains between London Victoria and Orpington, which are also operated by Southeastern. Beckenham Road tram stop is a three-minute walk away; it has Tramlink services to Croydon.

London Buses routes 194, 227, 354 and 358 serve the station.
