= Kent House railway station =

National Rail station in London, England

Kent House
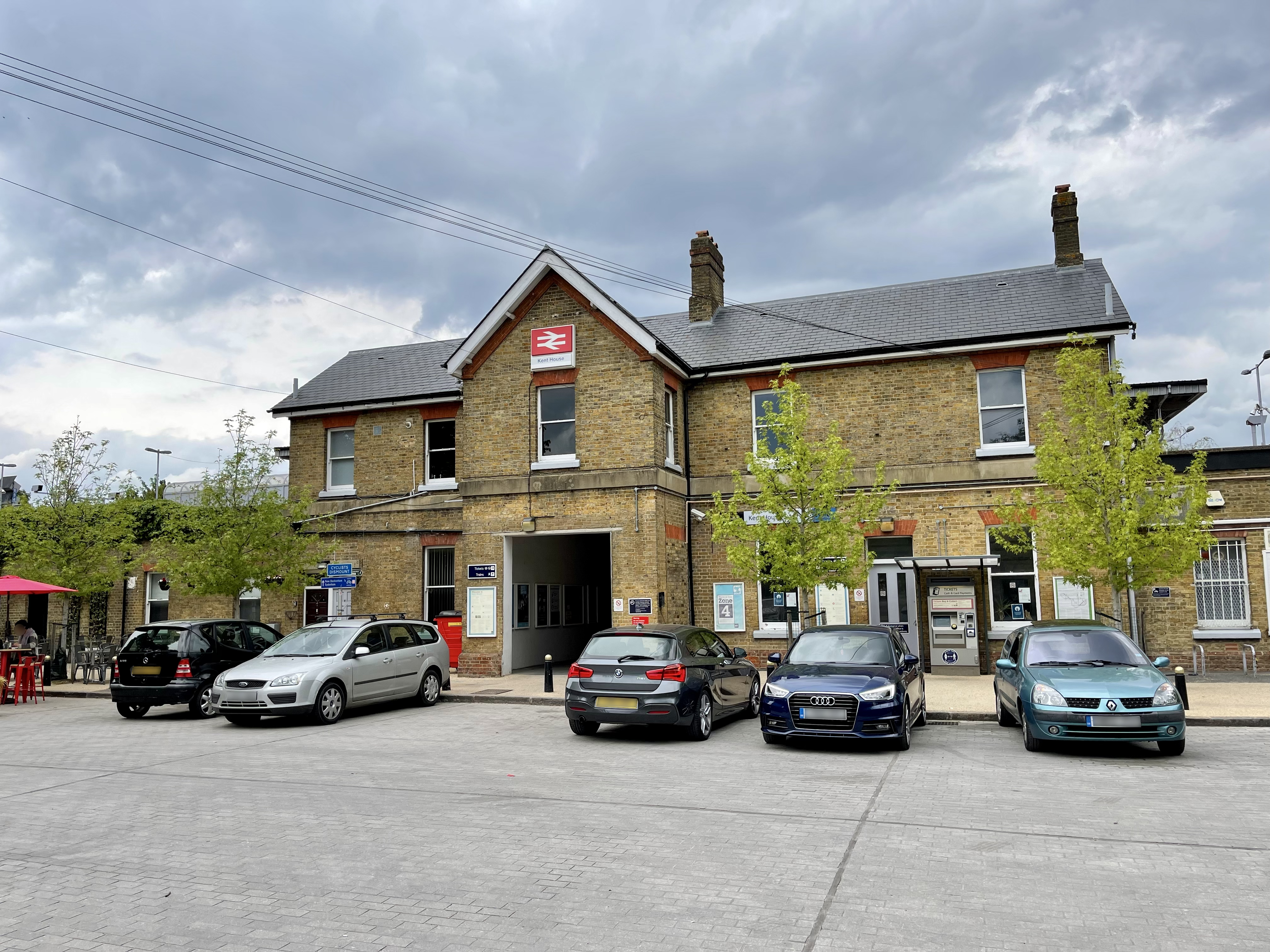
- Kent House railway station
- Interactive map of Kent House

General information
- Location: Beckenham
- Local authority: London Borough of Bromley
- Managed by: Southeastern
- Station code: KTH
- DfT category: D
- Number of platforms: 4
- Fare zone: 4
- OSI: Clock House

National Rail annual entry and exit
- 2020–21: ▼0.251 million
- Interchange: ▼76
- 2021–22: ▲0.595 million
- Interchange: ▲163
- 2022–23: ▲0.671 million
- 2023–24: ▲0.779 million
- 2024–25: ▲0.814 million

Key dates
- 1 July 1863: Line opens
- 1 October 1884: Station opens

Other information
- External links: Departures; Facilities
- Coordinates: 51.4123°N 0.0453°W

Kent House railway station is on the Chatham Main Line in England, serving part of the Penge and Beckenham areas in the London Borough of Bromley, south London. It is 7 miles 66 chains (12.6 km) down the line from London Victoria and is situated between Penge East and Beckenham Junction. It takes its name from the nearby Kent House farm, the first house in the historic county of Kent after crossing the Surrey border.

The station and most trains that call are operated by Southeastern, as part of the Bromley South Metro service, while a limited number of Thameslink services also call. Kent House is in London fare zone 4.

== History ==
The line was opened by the London, Chatham and Dover Railway (LCDR) on 1 July 1863, but the station was not opened until 1 October 1884 and was originally named Kent House (Beckenham). It lies above street level, where the booking office is situated; there is a subway and stairs to the platforms.

On 3 February 1993, an IRA bomb was detonated on a train at the station that was travelling from Victoria to Ramsgate. A warning had been given and everybody was safely evacuated before the explosion but the damage to the carriage was considerable.

== Services ==
All services at Kent House are operated by Southeastern using Class 376 , Class 465 and 466 EMUs.

The typical off-peak service in trains per hour is:

- 4 tph to London Victoria via Herne Hill
- 4 tph to Orpington via Bromley South

Additional services, including trains between Beckenham Junction and London Blackfriars call at the station during the peak hours.

On weekends, the service is reduced to two trains per hour in each direction.

Preceding station	National Rail	Following station
Penge East	Southeastern Bromley South Line	Beckenham Junction

== Connections ==
London Buses routes 194, 227 and 358 and night route N3 serve the station.

Clock House station on the Hayes Line (formerly the Mid-Kent Line) is a short walk from this station, and has trains between London Charing Cross and Hayes, which are also operated by Southeastern.

Beckenham Road tram stop is 5 minutes walking distance.
