= London Buses route 358 =

London bus route

358
- Metrobus Irizar ie tram at Bromley South station in March 2026

Overview
- Operator: Metrobus (Go-Ahead London)
- Garage: Orpington
- Vehicle: Irizar ie tram
- Peak vehicle requirement: 17
- Night-time: No night service

Route
- Start: Crystal Palace bus station
- Via: Anerley; Penge; Beckenham; Eden Park; Shortlands; Bromley; Locksbottom; Farnborough; Green Street Green
- End: Orpington station
- Length: 15 miles (24 km)

Service
- Level: Daily
- Frequency: About every 12-20 minutes
- Journey time: 45-97 minutes
- Operates: 04:00 until 01:29

London Buses route 358 is a Transport for London contracted bus route in London, England. Running between Crystal Palace bus station and Orpington station, it is operated by Go-Ahead London subsidiary Metrobus.

The route is one of the longest in London, at around 15 miles (24 km) in length.

== History ==
The route was introduced in 1989 on a commercial basis by Metrobus and initially only had two return journeys per day Monday to Friday. It became a Transport for London route in 2002 and was subsequently improved, with frequency increasing to every 12 minutes at peak times and every 20 minutes on evenings and Sundays. In 2014, it was taken over by Go-Ahead London who continues operate the route from Orpington bus garage.

In October 2022, Irizar signed a contract with Metrobus to supply twenty ie tram electric buses and the associated charging infrastructure for the route. At each end of the route an ultrafast charger was installed to allow buses to charge via a reverse pantograph (an overhead pantograph that drops down onto the bus). The ie tram buses began operating on the route on 20 November 2024.

== Current route ==
Route 358 operates via these primary locations:

- Crystal Palace bus station
- Crystal Palace station
- Anerley station
- Penge
- Kent House station
- Beckenham Road tram stop
- Clock House station
- Beckenham Beacon
- Elmers End
- Eden Park station
- Park Langley
- Shortlands station
- Bromley South station
- Bromley Common
- Locksbottom
- Farnborough
- Green Street Green
- Orpington High Street
- Orpington station
