= Hendon Park =

Park in London, England

Coordinates: 51.582°N 0.222°W

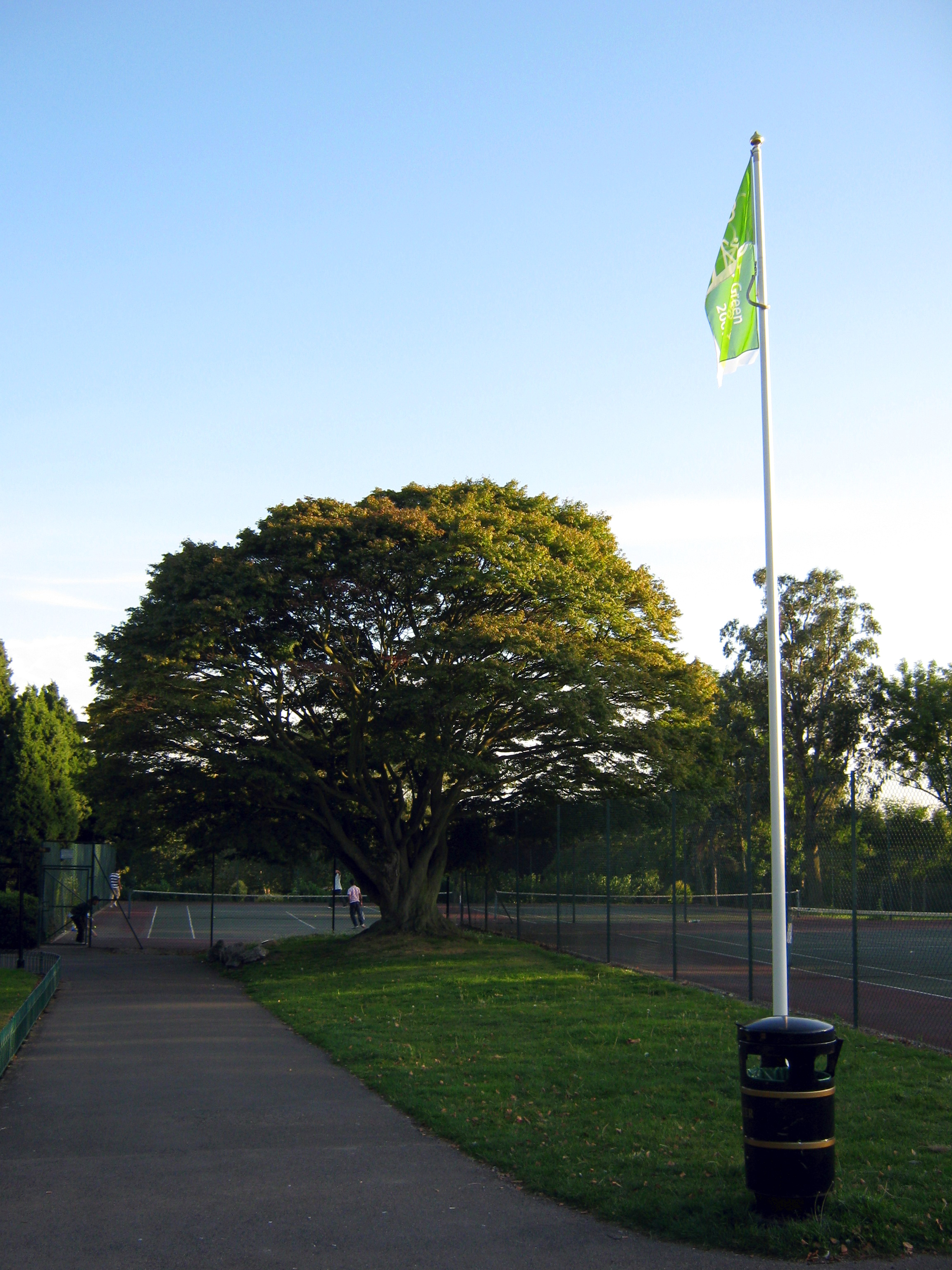
The acer tree with the park's green flag

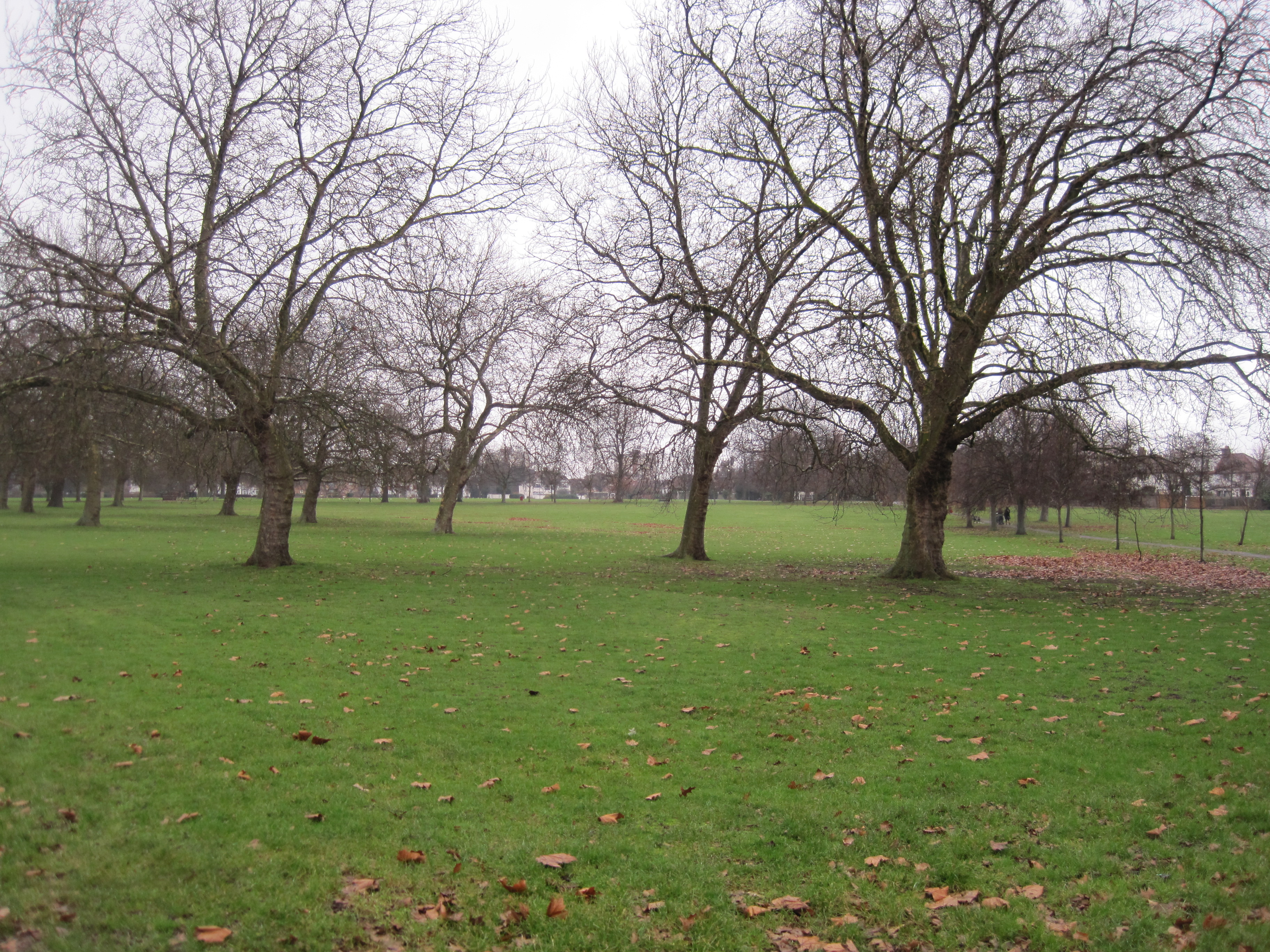

Hendon Park is a 12-hectare London suburban park situated 7 miles (11 km) north west of Charing Cross. It borders the Northern line, and Hendon Park and Northern line Railway Cutting are a Site of Local Importance for Nature Conservation.

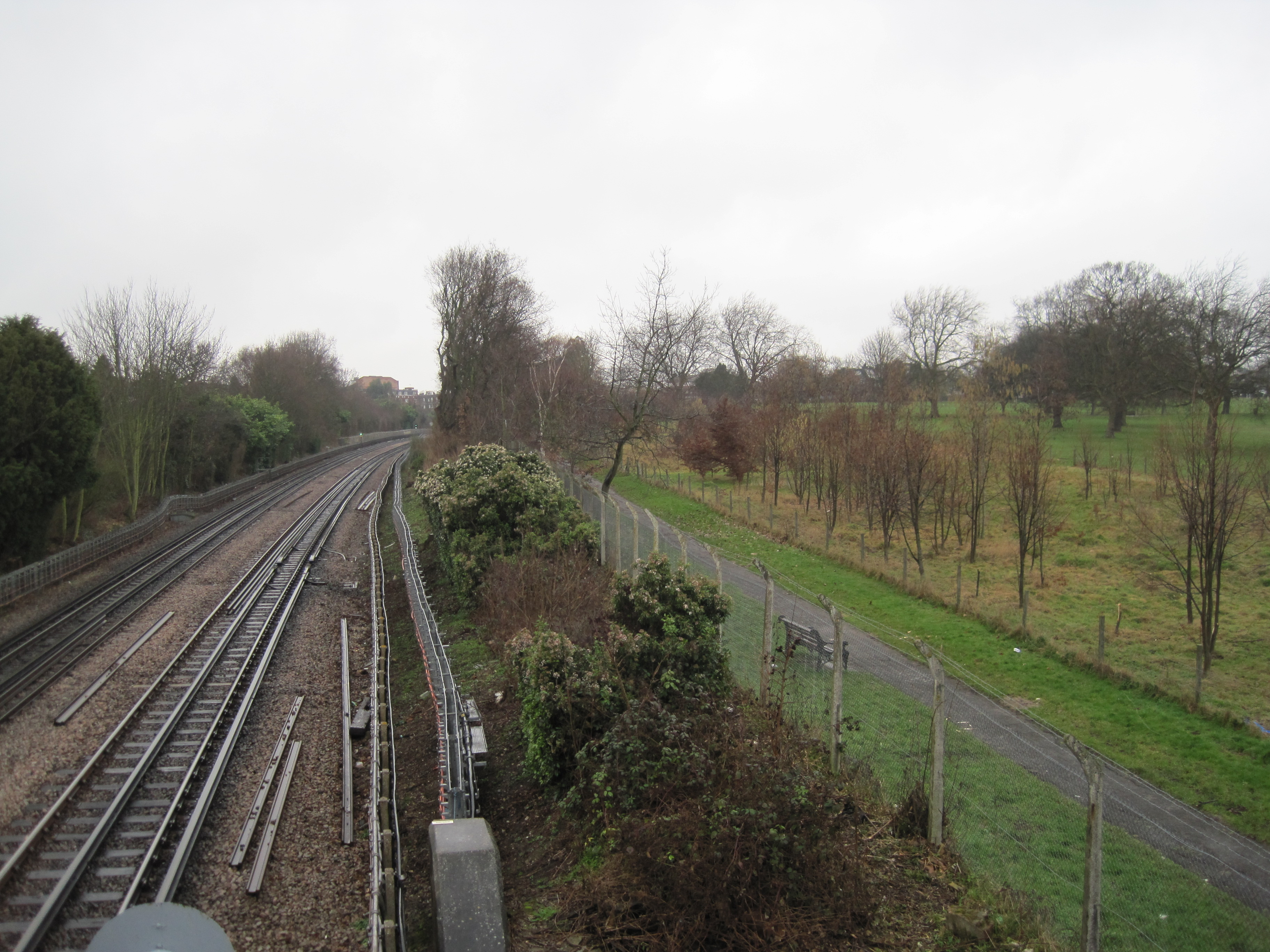
Northern Line Railway Cutting

It also has an outdoor gym (added in 2016), a playground, a café, and a stairway-bridge connecting the park almost to Brent Cross Shopping Centre.

The park offers tennis and basketball courts, and has five entrances to different areas of the park.

The park is also protected by the London Borough of Barnet, and it is situated between Hendon and Brent Cross, near two bus stops on the 83 route.

== History ==
Hendon Park was part of a mediæval estate known as the Steps Fields and owned by the Goodyer family. From 1868 to 1903 it was owned by the Kemp family when Hendon Council opened the park to the public.

The borough of Hendon became part of the larger London Borough of Barnet in April 1965. The park has a Holocaust Memorial Garden, which contains a pond and many plants, and is enclosed by large hedges. The Children's Millennium Wood planted in 2000 is a native-tree and grassland area, which will provide a good habitat for birds when it matures. The rest of the park is mainly informal parkland, with mown grass and mature trees, especially London plane and lime. It is a good spot for watching pipistrelle bats on a summer evening.

The landscape includes one of the largest specimens of Japanese maple in London and was recognised as one of the Great Trees of London in 2008. Many mature trees survive from the original planting, despite damage caused by the Great Storm of 1987 during which many trees were uprooted and destroyed.

=== Hendon Park during World War II ===
"Rout the Rumour", a large propaganda rally was held in Hendon Park on Sunday, 21 July 1940. The rally included songs, music and sketches. It was intended to promote the idea that gossip and rumour harmed the war effort.

The Hendon Park café was originally a bomb shelter, and is a single-storey, lead lined, solid brick building under a flat roof.

== Local transport links ==
Bus routes:

- 83, 113, 143, 186, 324, 326, 643 and 797 all pass nearby

Underground

- Station: Hendon Central
- Tube Line: Northern line, Edgware branch
- Distance: Two-three minutes' walk

== Green Flag award ==
The park was awarded the Green Flag Award in 2009-10

== See also ==
- Barnet parks and open spaces
- Nature reserves in Barnet
