= Beckenham Road tram stop =

Tramlink tram stop in London, England

Beckenham Road
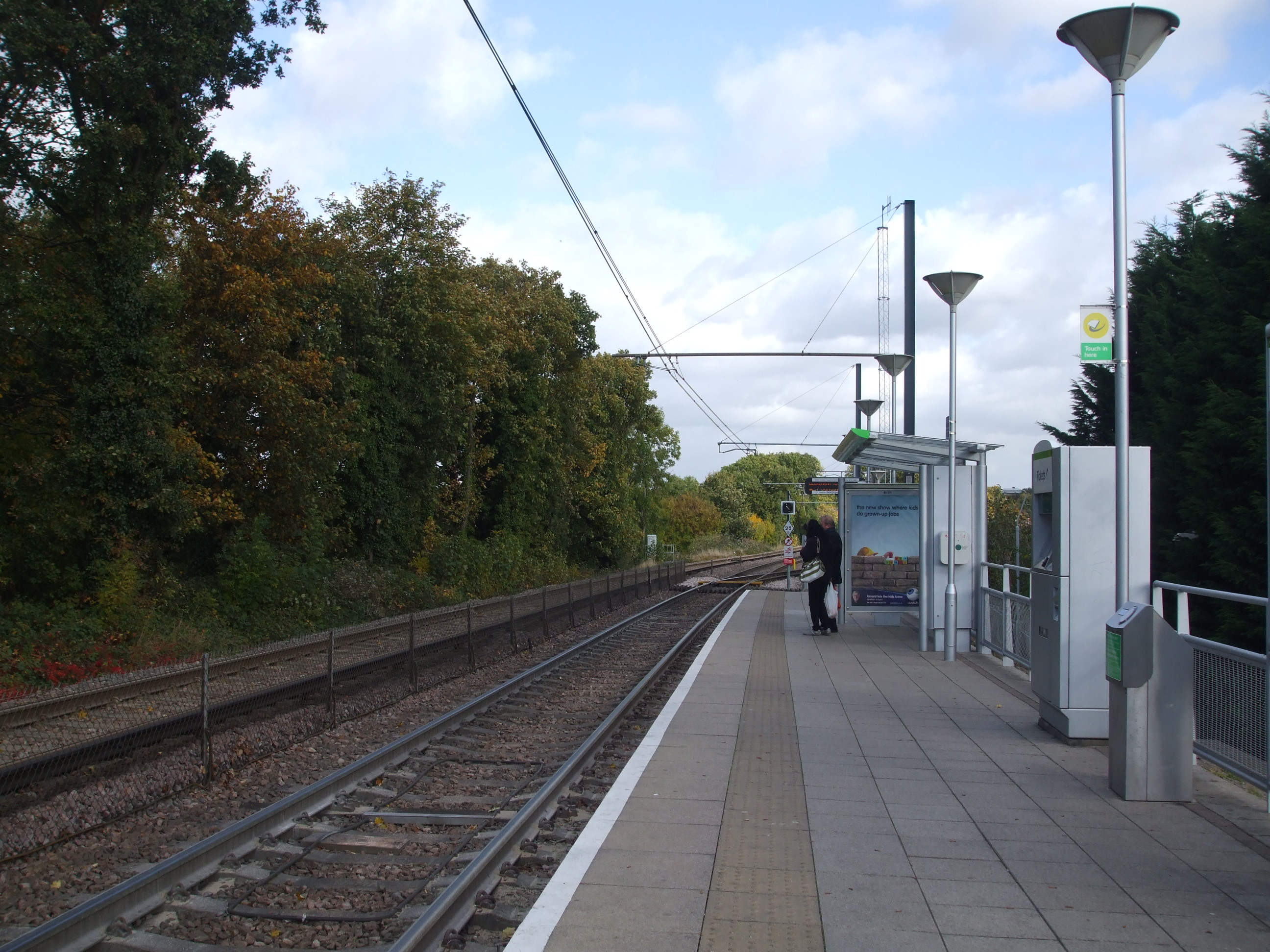
- Looking east

General information
- Location: Beckenham Road, Bromley
- Coordinates: 51.4096°N 0.0432°W
- Operated by: Tramlink
- Platforms: 2

Construction
- Structure type: At-grade
- Accessible: Yes

Other information
- Status: Unstaffed
- Website: Official website

History
- Opened: 23 May 2000
Location
- Location in Bromley

Beckenham Road tram stop is a light rail stop in the London Borough of Bromley in the southern suburbs of London. The stop is located on an embankment above Beckenham Road (A234) which connects Beckenham with Crystal Palace and Penge on the site of the short-lived (1858–1860) West End of London & Crystal Palace Railway Penge station.

== Services ==
Beckenham Road is served by tram services operated by Tramlink. The tram stop is served by trams every 10 minutes between Beckenham Junction and Wimbledon via Croydon.

On Saturday evenings and Sundays, the service is reduced to a tram every 15 minutes in each direction.

Services are operated using Bombardier CR4000 and Stadler Variobahn model low-floor trams.

Preceding station	Tramlink	Following station
Avenue Road towards Wimbledon	Tramlink; Wimbledon to Beckenham Junction	Beckenham Junction Terminus

== Connections ==
The stop is served by London Buses routes 194, 227, 354 and 358 which provide connections to Sydenham, Beckenham, Croydon Town Centre, Penge, Crystal Palace, Bromley and Orpington.

Free interchange for journeys made within an hour is available between bus services and between buses and trams is available at Beckenham Road as part of Transport for London's Hopper Fare.
