= Penge West railway station =

National rail station in London, England

Penge West
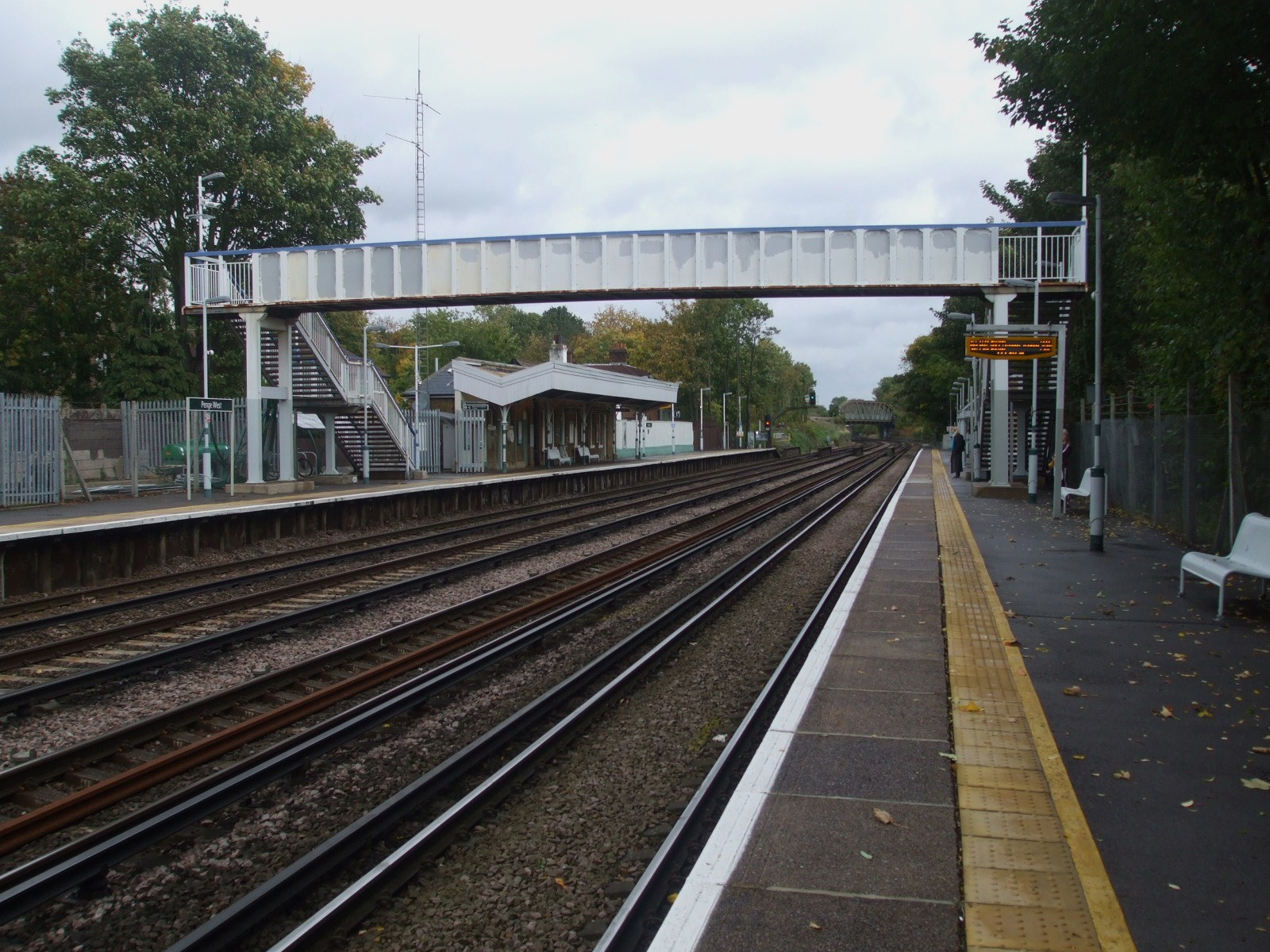
- Interactive map of Penge West

General information
- Location: Penge
- Local authority: London Borough of Bromley
- Managed by: London Overground
- Owner: Network Rail
- Station code: PNW
- DfT category: E
- Number of platforms: 2
- Tracks: 4
- Accessible: Yes (Northbound only)
- Fare zone: 4
- OSI: Penge East

National Rail annual entry and exit
- 2020–21: ▼0.218 million
- 2021–22: ▲0.483 million
- 2022–23: ▲0.609 million
- 2023–24: ▲0.648 million
- 2024–25: ▼0.635 million

Key dates
- 1839: Station Opened
- 1841: Closed
- 1 July 1863: Re-opened

Other information
- External links: Departures; Facilities
- Coordinates: 51.4174°N 0.0648°W

Penge West is a station on the Windrush line of the London Overground, located in Penge, a district of the London Borough of Bromley in south London. It is 7 miles 15 chains (7.19 miles, 11.57 km) down the line from London Bridge, in London fare zone 4. Additional limited peak-time National Rail services operated by Southern also call at Penge West.

There is an out-of-station interchange with Penge East station, located 680 metres (2,230 ft) walk away and served by Southeastern services into Central London. Crystal Palace station, also on the Windrush line of the London Overground, is also within walking distance. Penge West station provides access to The Dinosaur Park via the south gate of Crystal Palace Park.

== History ==
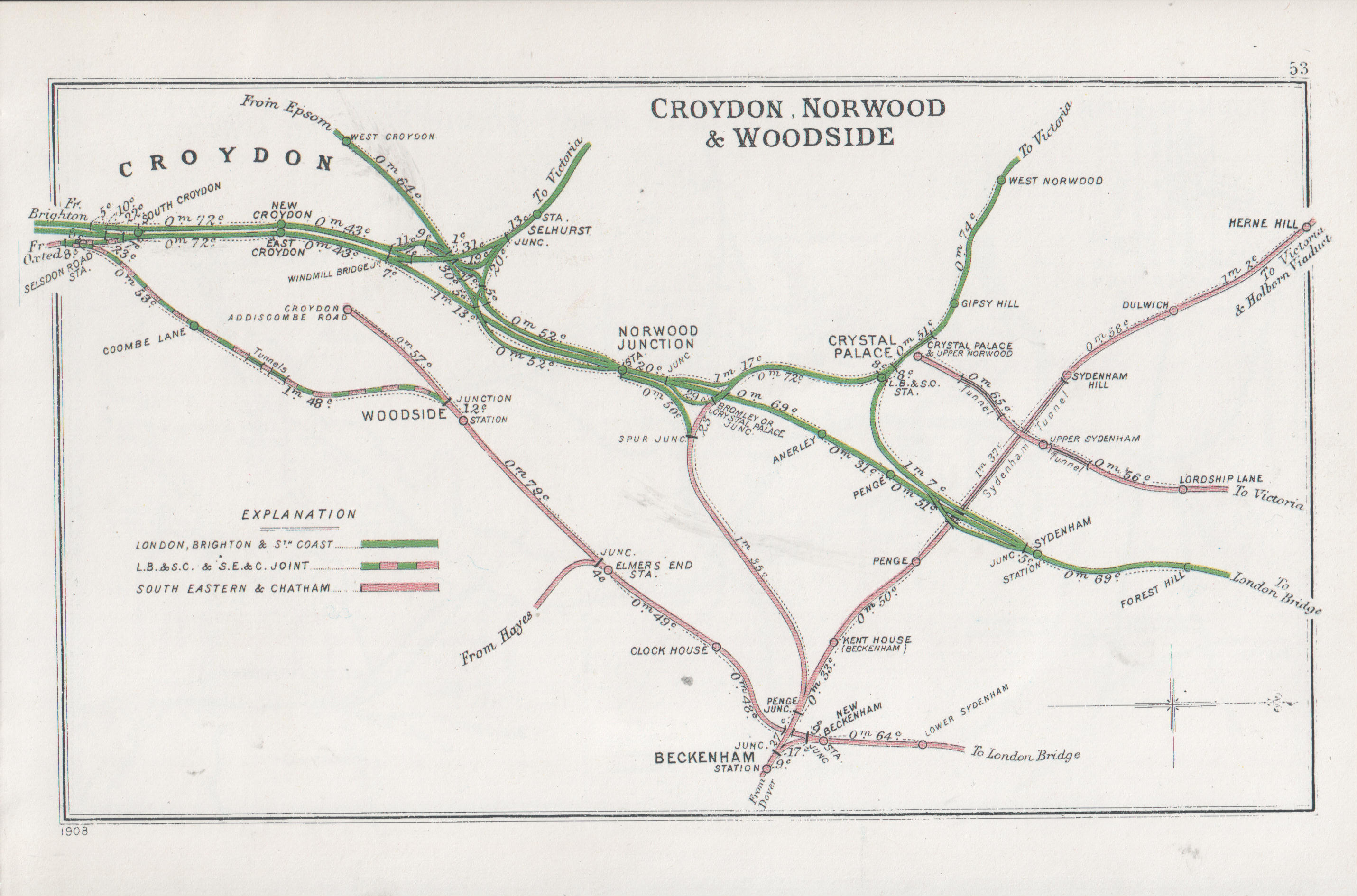
A 1908 Railway Clearing House map of lines around the Brighton Main Line between South Croydon and Selhurst / Forest Hill, as well as surrounding lines

The original Penge station was opened by the London and Croydon Railway in 1839, probably more for logistical reasons than anything else: the railway crossed the nearby High Street by a level crossing, and the station would have provided a place for trains to wait while the crossing gates were opened for them. The population of Penge was only around 270 at this time, not enough to make the station commercially viable. It was closed in 1841, and the level crossing was converted to a bridge soon afterwards. The entrance to the station was actually on Penge High Street, and not its current position. Evidence of the original entrances can still be seen in the brickwork on either side of the bridge as the track passes over the road.

By the early 1860s, Penge's population had risen to over 5,000 - more than eighteen times its level just twenty years earlier. There was also a demand for improved transport to the Crystal Palace nearby, so the station was reopened by the London, Brighton and South Coast Railway on 1 July 1863. This was the same day that the London, Chatham and Dover Railway opened its own Penge Lane station on its line to London Victoria. Following the 1923 Grouping of railway companies, the two stations were renamed Penge West, and Penge East by the Southern Railway on 9 July 1923.

A large building on the down platform served as a ticket office and goods office and included the waiting room and Station Master's office. A wide road from the corner of Oakfield Road and Penge High Street provided access to these buildings and sidings which served a coal yard and timber yard on the site of the old brickfield. The sidings were removed, the buildings demolished and the access road closed when the land was sold for the construction of a Homebase store. Since then access to the down platform has been via a footbridge from the up platform. Previously the only passenger access between the two platforms was via Penge High Street.

The 1863 station building serving the Up platform remained in use until April 2005 when it was damaged in a fire set by arsonists. After a period of limited station facilities, reconstruction work commenced in the summer of 2006 and was completed in December that year.

== Services ==
Off-peak, all services at Penge West are operated by the Windrush line of the London Overground using Class 378 EMUs.

The typical off-peak service in trains per hour is:

- 4 tph to Highbury & Islington via Surrey Quays
- 4 tph to West Croydon

The station is also served by a limited Southern service to/from London Bridge in the peak hours. All day off peak services to London Bridge were axed in September 2022. These services are operated using Class 377 EMUs.

Preceding station	National Rail	Following station
Sydenham	Southern Brighton Main Line; Stopping Services Limited Service	Anerley
Preceding station	London Overground	Following station
Sydenham towards Highbury & Islington	Windrush line East London line	Anerley towards West Croydon

== Connections ==
London Buses routes 176, 197 and 227 stop near the station, while the Bromley-bound 354 stops directly outside the station entrance on Anerley Park.

The station is also a short 9 minute walk from Penge East station for Southeastern services.
