= Preston Park (Brent) =

Park in the London Borough of Brent, England

Coordinates: 51°34′14″N 0°18′10″W

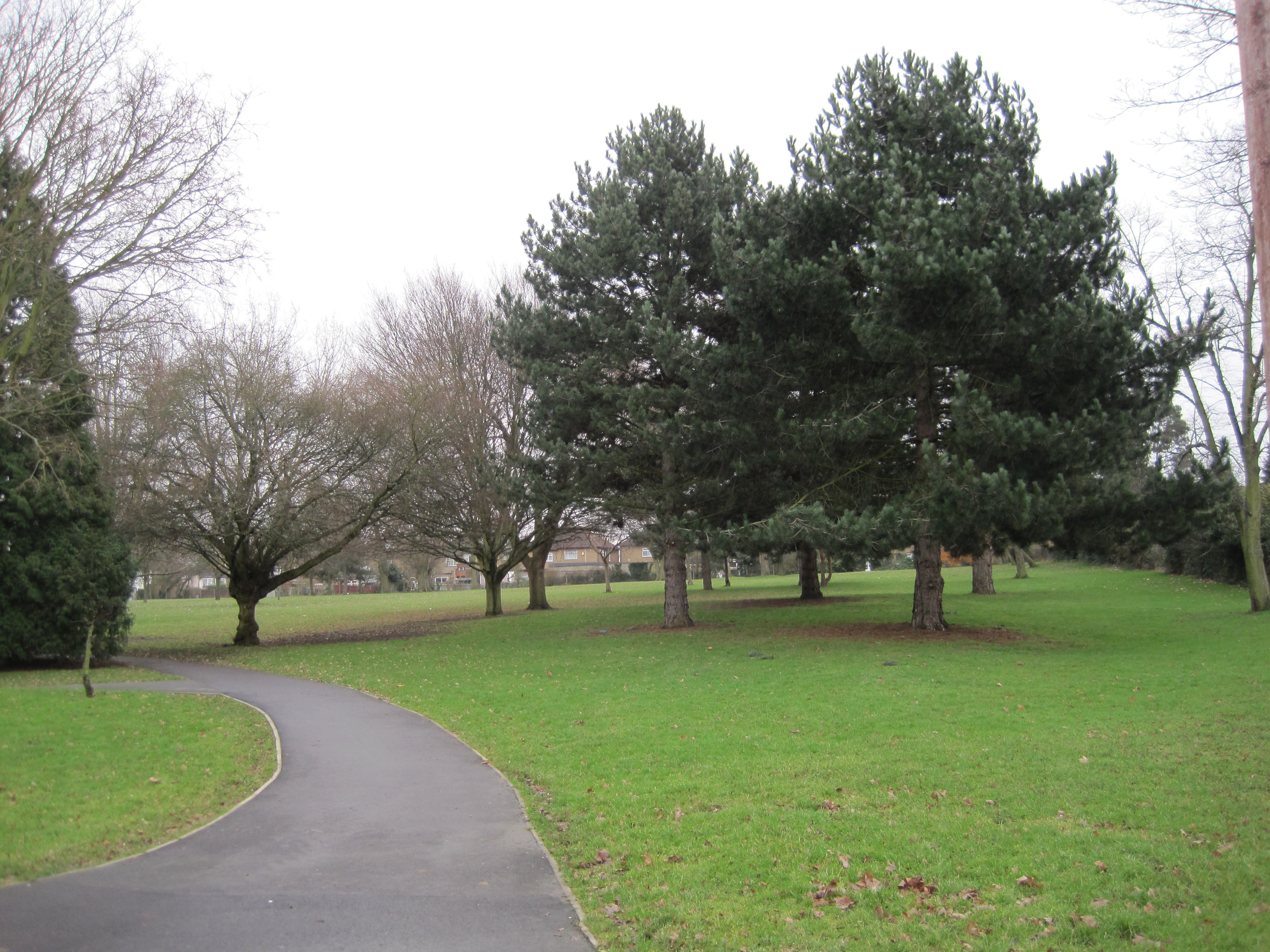
Preston Park

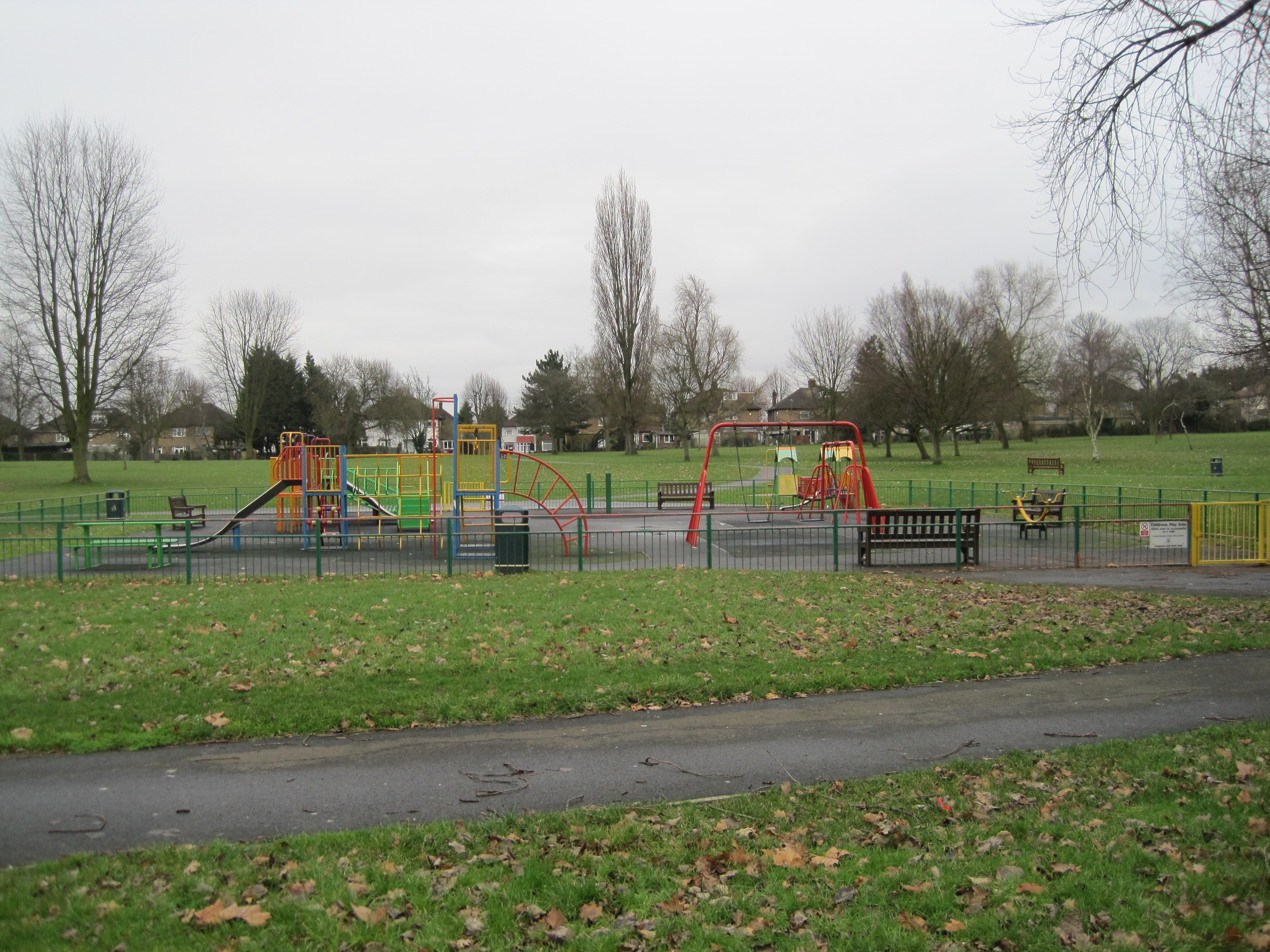
Playground

Preston Park is a 7.5-hectare (19-acre) public park in Preston in the London Borough of Brent. It is Green Flag accredited.

It is a grassed area with scattered trees, with two sports pavilions and a playground.

There is access from Carlton Avenue East, College Road and Montpelier Rise.

== See also ==
- Brent parks and open spaces
