= Penge East railway station =

National Rail station in London, England

Penge East
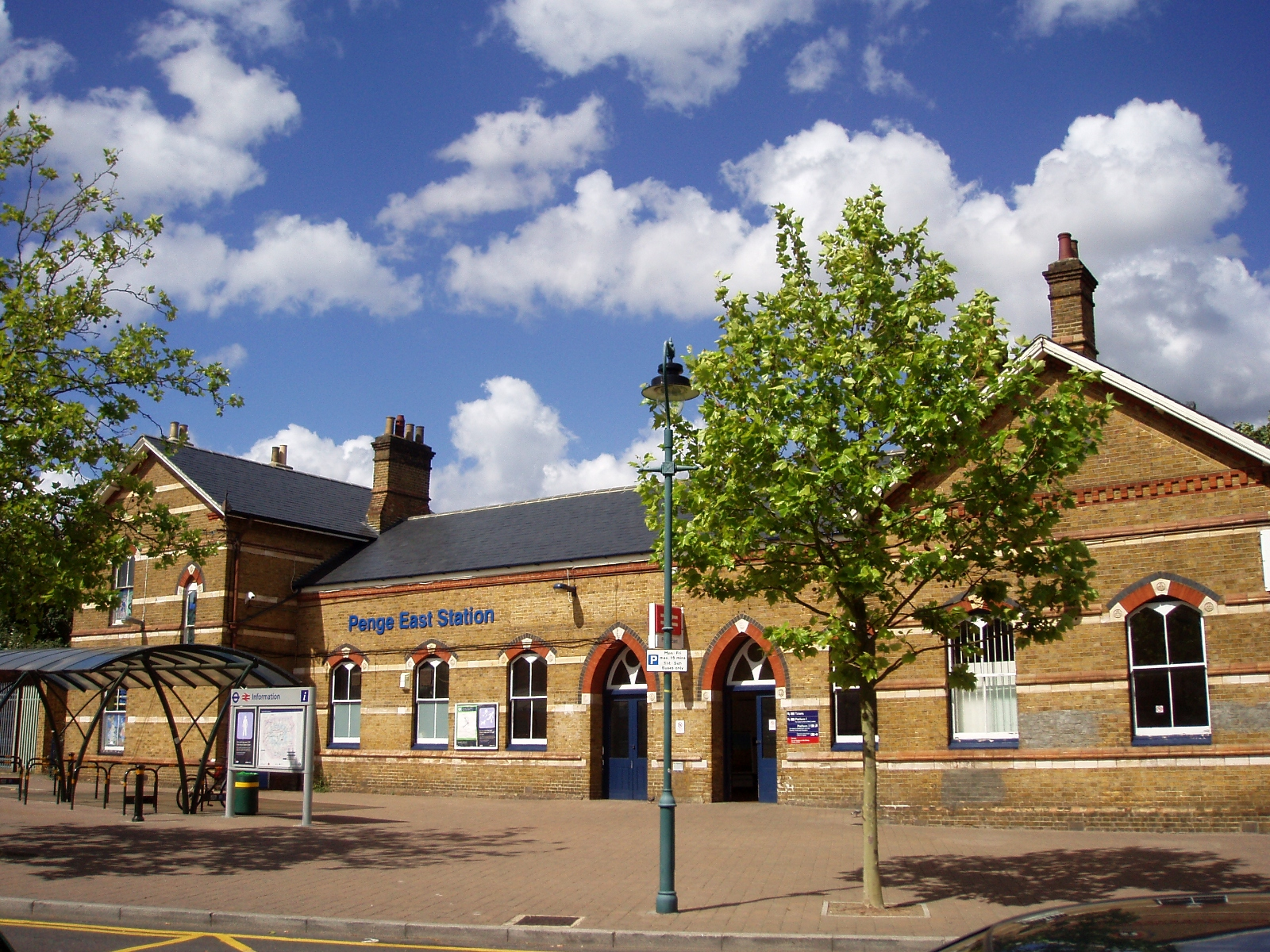
- Interactive map of Penge East

General information
- Location: Penge
- Local authority: London Borough of Bromley
- Managed by: Southeastern
- Station code: PNE
- DfT category: D
- Number of platforms: 2
- Accessible: Yes
- Fare zone: 4
- OSI: Penge West

National Rail annual entry and exit
- 2020–21: ▼0.441 million
- Interchange: ▼1,627
- 2021–22: ▲0.948 million
- Interchange: ▲3,647
- 2022–23: ▲1.036 million
- Interchange: ▼1,975
- 2023–24: ▲1.191 million
- Interchange: ▼1,551
- 2024–25: ▲1.236 million
- Interchange: ▼93

Key dates
- 1 July 1863: Opened

Other information
- External links: Departures; Facilities
- Coordinates: 51.4191°N 0.0537°W

Penge East railway station is on the Chatham Main Line in England, serving part of the Penge and Sydenham areas in the London Borough of Bromley, south London. It is 7 miles 15 chains (11.6 km) down the line from London Victoria and is situated between Sydenham Hill and Kent House.

The station and all trains that call are operated by Southeastern, as part of the Bromley South Metro service. Penge East is in London fare zone 4.

== History ==
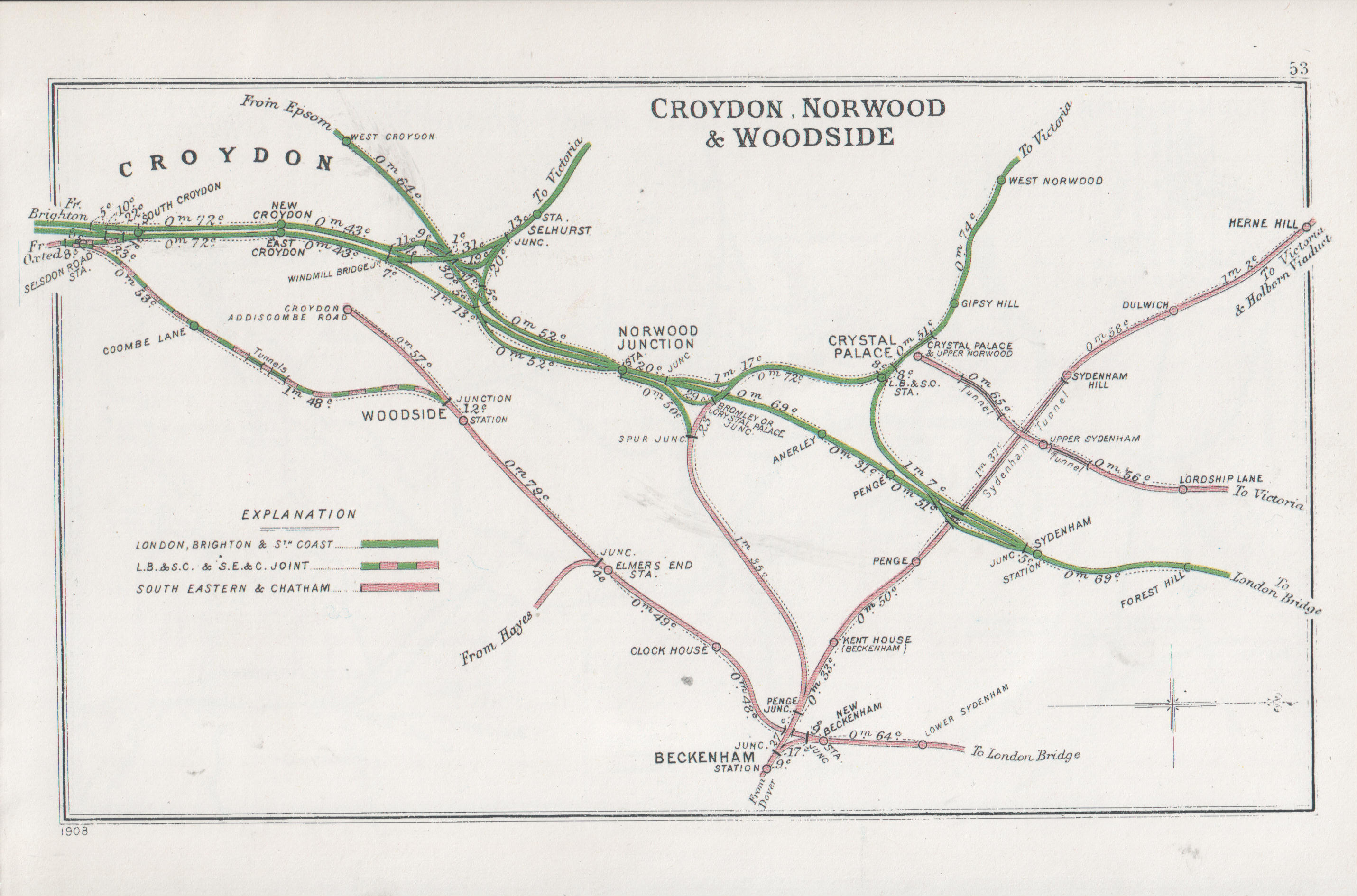
A 1908 Railway Clearing House map of lines around the Brighton Main Line and Chatham Main Line in South London.

The station is 7.2 miles (11 km) from London Victoria on the Chatham Main Line and was opened on 1 July 1863. It was built by the London, Chatham and Dover Railway and originally known as Penge (LCDR) or Penge Lane, and was renamed Penge East on 9 July 1923. When the line was built a level crossing was built where the line crossed the old alignment of Penge Lane (now Newlands Park and St John's Road). When the level crossing was closed in about 1879, Penge Lane traffic was diverted down what are now Lennard Road, Parish Lane and the current Penge Lane.

The covered footbridge with its corrugated roof dates from the 1880s and is a listed structure. The station is close to the South-Eastern portal of Penge Railway Tunnel.

Penge West station is a short walk away, with London Overground services to West Croydon and Highbury & Islington.

== Services ==
All services at Penge East are operated by Southeastern using Class 465 and 466 EMUs.

The typical off-peak service in trains per hour is:

- 4 tph to London Victoria via Herne Hill
- 4 tph to Orpington via Bromley South

Additional services, including trains between Beckenham Junction and London Blackfriars call at the station during the peak hours.

On weekends, the service is reduced to two trains per hour in each direction.

Preceding station	National Rail	Following station
Sydenham Hill	Southeastern Bromley South Line	Kent House

== Connections ==
London Buses routes 75, 176, 194, 197, 227 and 354 serve the station.

The station is also a short walk from Penge West station for London Overground services.

== See also ==
- Murder of Deborah Linsley – Unsolved murder of a woman in 1988, in which the attacker was believed to have got onto the woman's carriage at Penge East
